= 7th Army Training Command =

Coordinates: 49°42′46.3″N 11°54′04.3″E

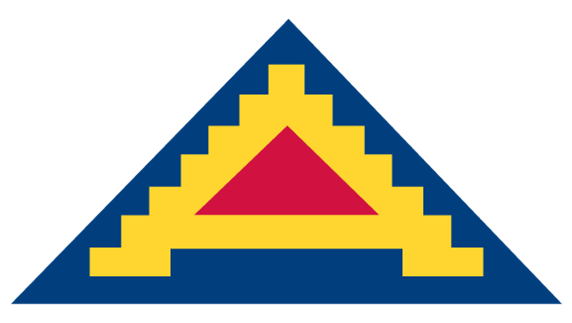
- Seventh Army Shoulder Sleeve Insignia, worn by 7th Army Training Command
- Active: 1958-present
- Country: United States
- Branch: Army
- Type: Training
- Role: Headquarters
- Part of: U.S. Army Europe and Africa
- Garrison/HQ: Tower Barracks, Germany
- Motto: Ready Thru Training
- Website: 7th Army Training Command

Commanders
- Current commander: BG Terry R. Tillis

Insignia
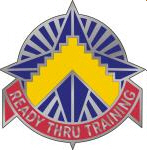
- Distinctive unit insignia
- Abbreviation: 7th ATC
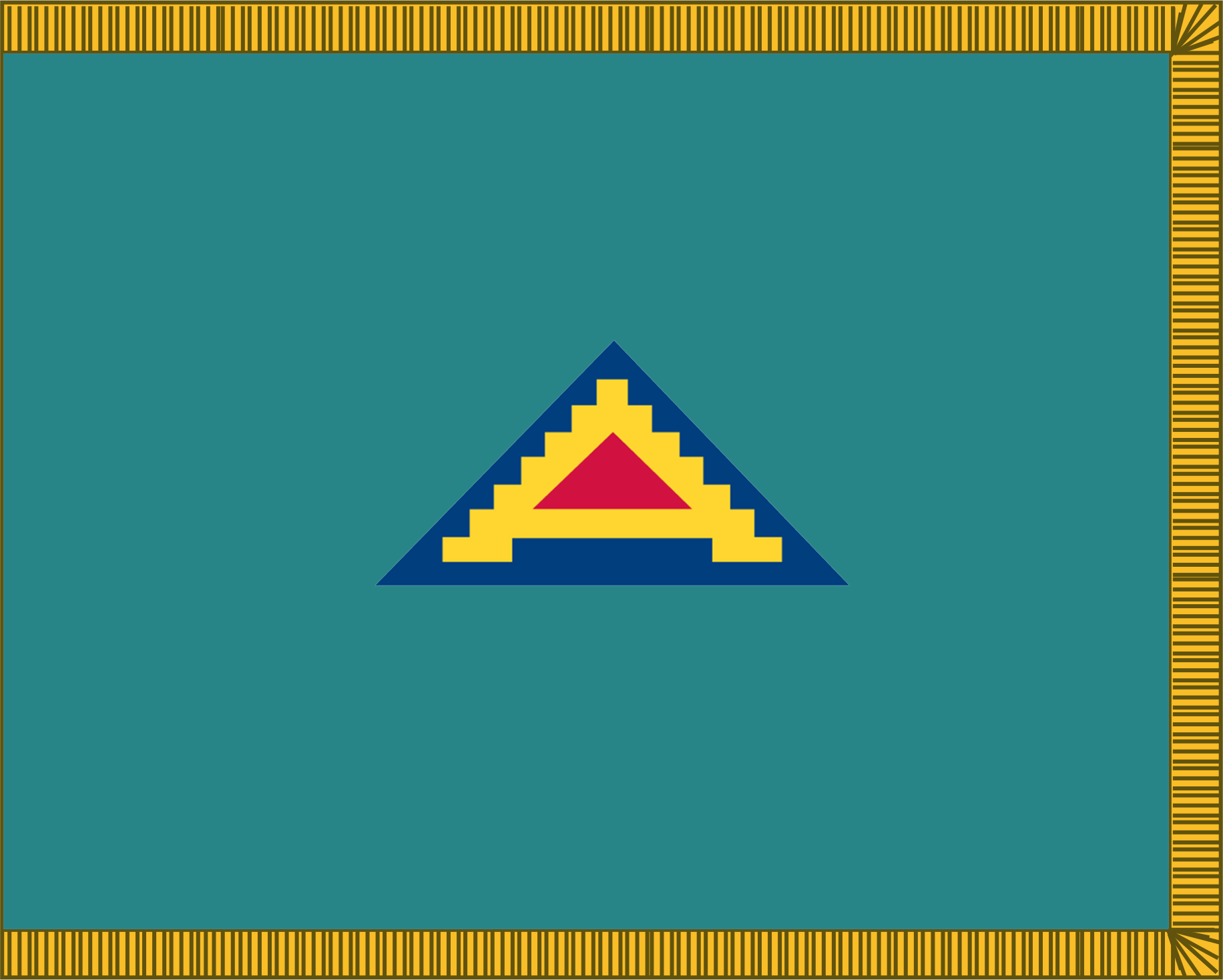
- 7th Army Training Command Flag

The 7th Army Training Command (7th ATC) is a United States Army training organization located at Tower Barracks, Germany. 7th ATC comes under the command of the U.S. Army Europe (USAREUR). 7th ATC is the United States Army's largest overseas training command and responsible for providing and overseeing the training requirements for USAREUR soldiers as well as North Atlantic Treaty Organization (NATO) and partner-nation countries.

== Shoulder sleeve insignia ==
The training command's shoulder patch was originally approved for Seventh Army on 23 June 1943.

On a blue right angle triangular background, the hypotenuse to base, a seven-stepped letter "A," steps in yellow with the center in scarlet

== History ==
In 1948, the Grafenwoehr Training Area was assigned to the 7th Army and designated a tank training center. In 1959, Grafenwoehr becomes headquarters of the Seventh Army Training Center, incorporating the Grafenwoehr and Hohenfels Training Areas to become the largest training complex in Germany. In 1975, Grafenwoehr becomes the headquarters for the Seventh U.S. Army Training Center, which becomes the Seventh Army Training Command the following year. As of January 2006, the 7th ATC became known as the 7th Army Joint Multinational Training Command. In July 2016, the 7th Army Joint Multinational Training Command was returned to its original designation as the 7th Army Training Command.

== Purpose ==
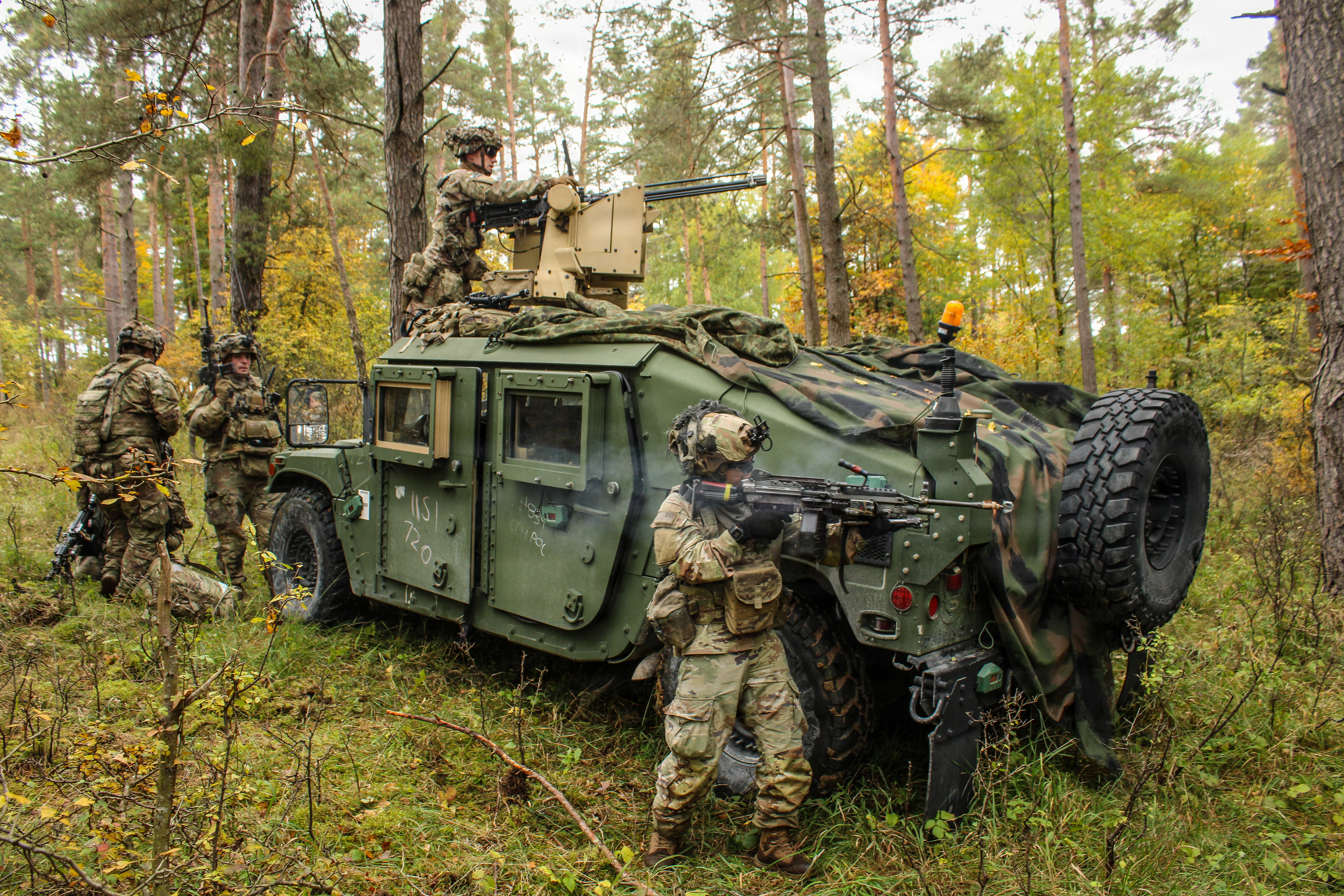
1-502nd Infantry Regiment, 2nd Brigade, 101st Airborne Division training at the Joint Multinational Readiness Center in Hohenfels, Germany, October 2025

7th ATC provides dynamic training, preparing forces to execute Unified Land Operations and contingencies in support of the Combatant Commands, NATO, and other national requirements

7th ATC consists of seven subordinate directorates, comprising the Grafenwoehr Training Area; the Joint Multinational Readiness Center in Hohenfels; the Joint Multinational Simulation Center in Grafenwoehr; the 7th Army Combined Arms Training Center in Vilseck; the 7th Army Noncommissioned Officer Academy in Grafenwoehr; the International Special Training Centre in Pfullendorf; and the Training Support Activity, Europe at Grafenwoehr. The responsibility to provide community support for 7th ATC installations belongs to U.S. Army Garrison Bavaria. More than 15,000 soldiers and civilian employees and 9,500 family members make up the USAG Bavaria.

== Organization 2025 ==
As of December 2025 the 7th Army Training Command consists of the following units:

- 7th Army Training Command, in Grafenwöhr
  - Headquarters and Headquarters Company, in Grafenwöhr
  - Combined Arms Training Center, in Vilseck
  - Grafenwöhr Training Area, in Grafenwöhr
  - International Special Training Center, in Pfullendorf
  - Joint Multinational Readiness Center, in Hohenfels
  - Joint Multinational Simulation Center, in Grafenwöhr
  - Joint Multinational Training Group Ukraine, in Yavoriv, Ukraine
  - Noncommissioned Officers Academy, in Grafenwöhr
  - Training Support Activity Europe, in Grafenwöhr
  - Georgia Defense Readiness Program - Training, at Vaziani Military Base, Georgia

== List of commanding generals ==
No.	Commanding General		Term		
No.	Portrait	Name	Took office	Left office	Duration
Commander, Joint Multinational Training Command
–	David G. Perkins	Brigadier General; David G. Perkins (born 1957)	August 2005	April 19, 2007	~1 year, 261 days
–	David R. Hogg	Brigadier General; David R. Hogg (born 1958)	April 19, 2007	June 9, 2009	2 years, 51 days
–	Steven L. Salazar	Brigadier General; Steven L. Salazar	August 28, 2009	July 8, 2011	1 year, 314 days
–	Bryan L. Rudacille	Colonel; Bryan L. Rudacille	July 8, 2011	June 26, 2013	1 year, 353 days
–	Walter E. Piatt	Major General; Walter E. Piatt	June 26, 2013	July 21, 2014	1 year, 25 days
–	Christopher G. Cavoli	Brigadier General; Christopher G. Cavoli	July 21, 2014	July 15, 2016	1 year, 360 days
Commanding General, 7th Army Training Command
–	Antonio Aguto	Brigadier General; Antonio Aguto	July 15, 2016	May 11, 2018	1 year, 307 days
–	Christopher C. LaNeve	Brigadier General; Christopher C. LaNeve	May 18, 2018	June 11, 2019	1 year, 24 days
–	Christopher R. Norrie	Brigadier General; Christopher R. Norrie	June 11, 2019	June 2, 2021	1 year, 356 days
–	Joseph E. Hilbert	Brigadier General; Joseph E. Hilbert	June 2, 2021	June 20, 2023	2 years, 18 days
–	Steven P. Carpenter	Brigadier General; Steven P. Carpenter	June 20, 2023	June 30, 2025	2 years, 10 days
–	Terry R. Tillis	Brigadier General; Terry R. Tillis	June 30, 2025	Incumbent	1 year, 2 days
