= U.S. Army Garrison Bavaria =

United States Army Garrison Bavaria
- US-Heeresgarnison Bayern
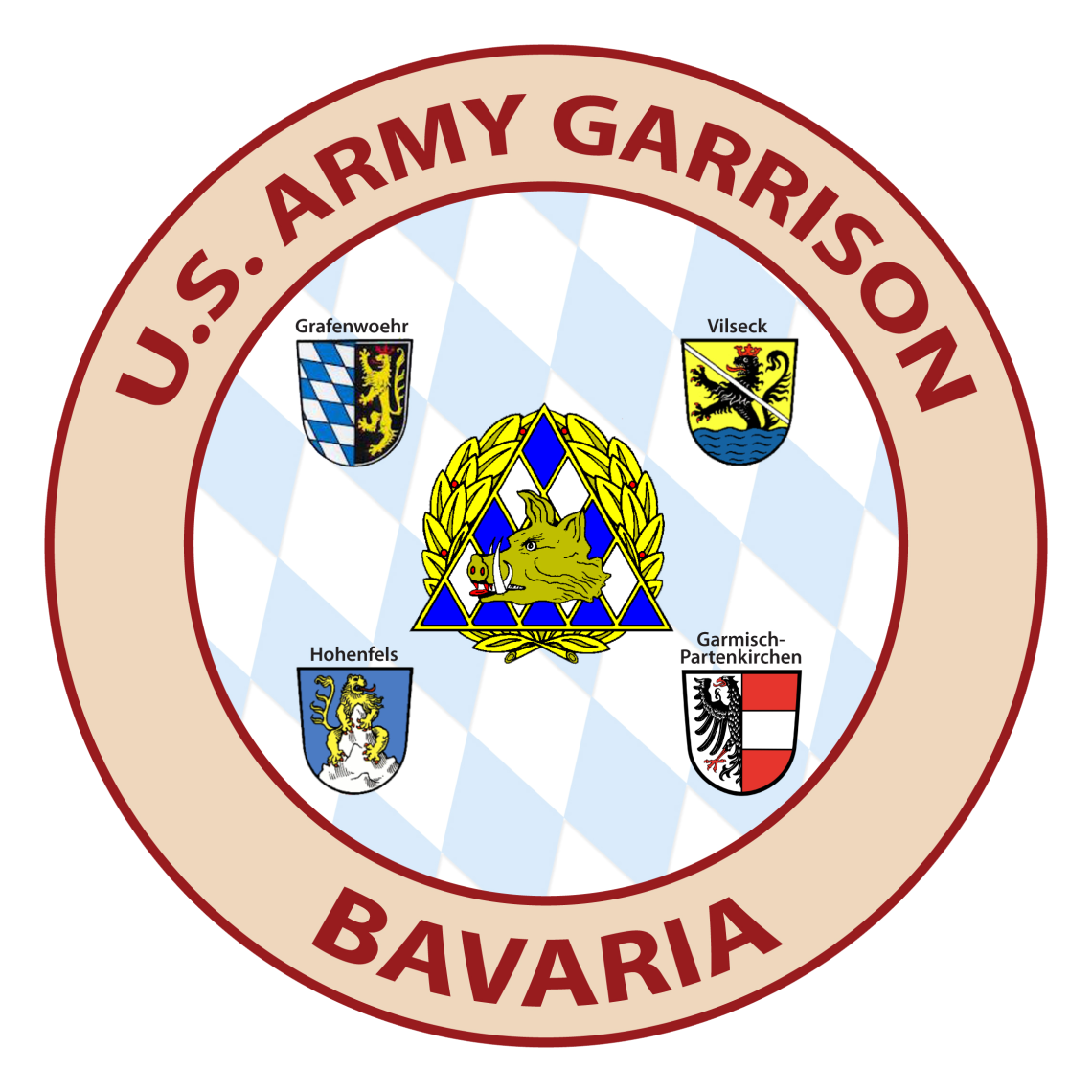
- Army Garrison Bavaria logo
- Country: Germany
- Allegiance: United States
- Branch: United States Army
- Part of: United States Army Europe, United States Army Installation Management Command
- Garrison/HQ: Tower Barracks, Grafenwoehr, Germany

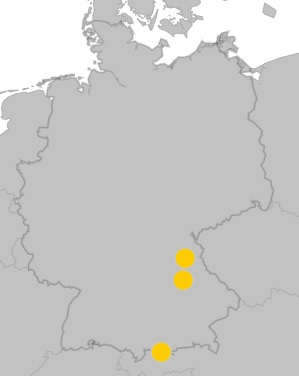
U.S. Army Garrison Bavaria Installations in Bavaria, Germany

The United States Army Garrison Bavaria is a garrison of the United States Army headquartered in Grafenwöhr, Germany, with four locations, which include Grafenwöhr (Tower Barracks), Vilseck (Rose Barracks), Hohenfels (Hohenfels Training Area) and Garmisch (George C. Marshall Center and NATO School), along with Grafenwöhr Training Area Camps.

== History ==
=== Garrison ===
In 2013, U.S. Army Garrison Grafenwöhr was transformed to U.S. Army Garrison Bavaria, a single garrison. In February 2017, in response to the growing rotational force and training troop presence, U.S. Army Garrison Bavaria established the 5th Community to "manage garrison resources in the training camps, deconflict infrastructure and facilities usage, and ensure the efficient operation and integration of garrison support to deployment, sustainment, and redeployment operations."

== Mission ==
U.S. Army Garrison Bavaria is the largest U.S. base outside of the United States and hosts 40,000 soldiers and civilians. The garrison's mission is to provide a "high-quality base operations and community support" to all U.S. personnel in Grafenwöhr-Vilseck, Hohenfels and Garmisch. The garrison also directly supports the 7th Army Training Command (the largest training command outside the continental United States), the Combat Maneuver Training Command, 2nd Cavalry Regiment and several other tenant units.

== Locations ==
=== Grafenwöhr and Vilseck ===
The Grafenwöhr Training Area (GTA) was created following the activation of the III Royal Bavarian Corps in 1900, and in 1908, the training area was officially designated as "Training Area Grafenwöhr". After the Nazis took power, the Wehrmacht used the training area for military training and guarded enemy prisoners of war. After WWII, U.S. Army Europe expanded the role of the training area to meet the increased training & facilities needs, to support the troops. A large build-up of Rose Barracks in Vilseck occurred in the mid-1980s with the construction of facilities to support a brigade size element which is now home to the 2nd Cavalry Regiment. 2001 brought the start of a build-up of Tower Barracks (Formerly East Camp) with new construction, realignment, and renovations to support a Brigade Combat Team (BCT), which was completed in 2012 and now houses two 173rd ABCT Battalions and supports Regionally Aligned Forces (RAF), in support of the European Deterrence Initiative (EDI). With the establishment of the training area, Grafenwöhr and its subdivisions Gmuend, Huetten, and Goeßenreuth lost 2,820 hectares, meaning two-thirds of its real estate, as well as a portion of its back country.

Nevertheless, the military caused a consistent economic growth in the city of Grafenwöhr. The number of inhabitants doubled between 1909 and 1910, from 961 to 1,841. In 2010, Grafenwöhr had 6,550 inhabitants. Since 2010, the fluctuating development of Grafenwöhr has been closely connected to the development of the training area. The Water Tower joined the city's original landmark, the gothic town hall built in 1462. With 232 km^{2}, it is the largest NATO training facility in Europe today, providing vast ranges, simulation centers, classrooms and facilities for realistic and relevant training to U.S. Army, Joint Service, NATO and allied units and leaders.

==== Former Villages ====
Approximately 250 residents of ten villages, farms and hamlets had to leave their homes between 1907 and 1910 as a result of the establishment of the training area. During the large expansion of the training area to its current size in 1938, 3.500 residents of 57 villages, farms and hamlets were resettled. The families were moved to other communities in all parts of Bavaria, where they were given houses and land or were financially compensated. The resettlement was organized by the Reich's Resettlement Corporation (RUGES), allegedly with pressure from the Third Reich. Hopfenohe, Pappenberg and Haag were the three largest villages back in the time. After WWII, the villages were released for the removal of building materials. Only a few remnants of the walls, vaulted cellars, wells, remains of churches, chapels and cemeteries bear witness to the former villages.

=== Hohenfels ===
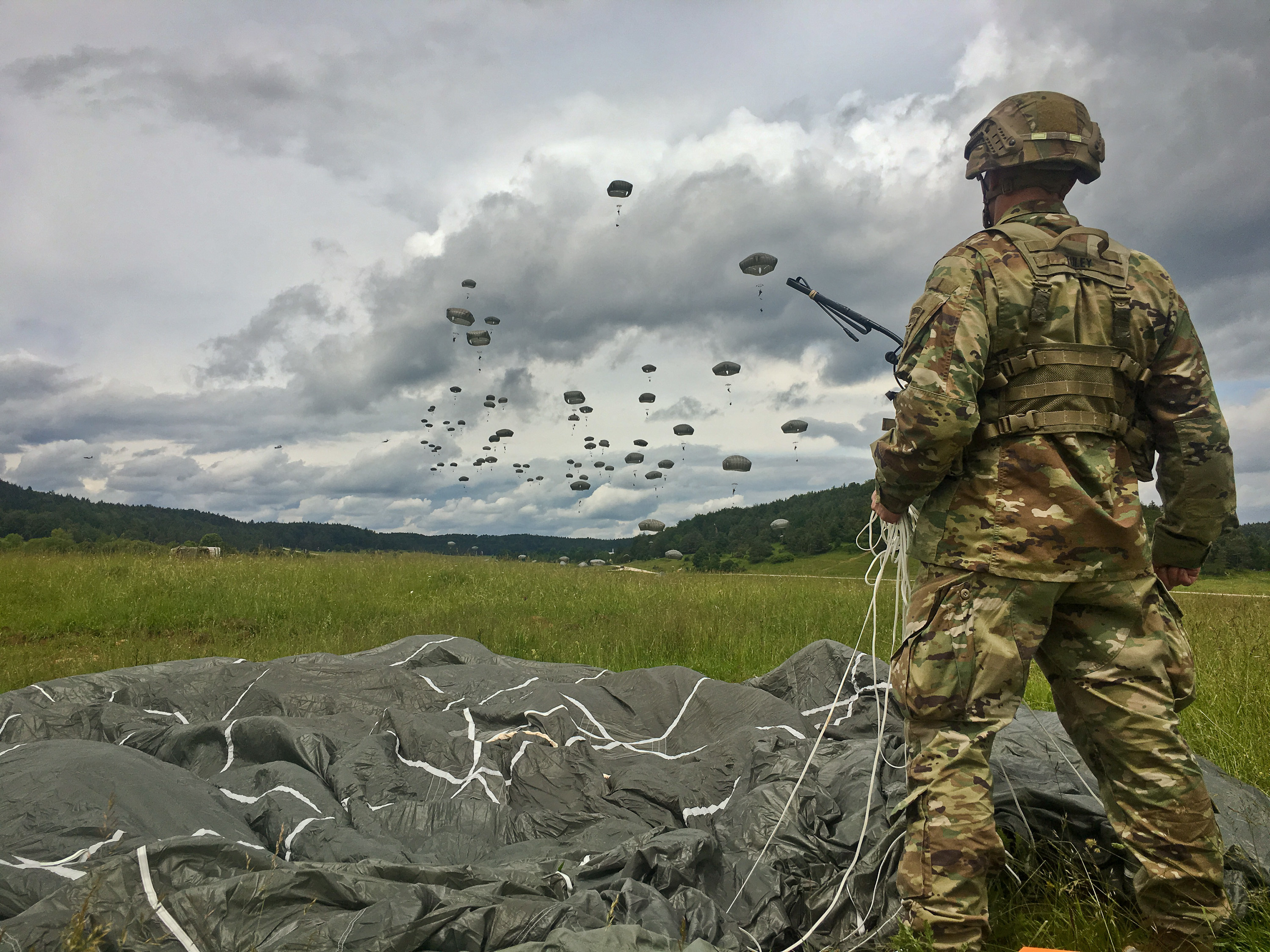
U.S. paratroopers descend upon Hohenfels Drop Zone

The Hohenfels Training Area (HTA) is named after the town of Hohenfels. The German Army founded the training area in Hohenfels in 1938. In 1951, it became a U.S. Forces training area and was used primarily by U.S. Forces. In 1988, Hohenfels Training Area became the home of the Combat Manoeuvre Training Center (CMTC), with the mission to provide realistic force-on-force combined arms training exercises for the U.S. Army Europe and 7th Army's manoeuvre battalion task forces. Combat Manoeuvre Training Center was transformed and officially named the Joint Multinational Readiness Center in December 2005. It is the largest U.S. Army Europe manoeuvre training area. In May 2014, U.S. Army Garrison Hohenfels became a U.S. Army Garrison Bavaria community.

=== Garmisch ===
The Garmisch Military Post and Garmisch Recreation Center, which operated a variety of hotels and outdoor sports facilities, were established in 1946 and based in the installations of the German Army's 1st Mountain Division. In 1947, Garmisch became home to the U.S. Army Russian Institute and in 1953 the NATO School opened its doors in nearby Oberammergau cementing the community's role as a center for both military education and U.S. Forces Recreation over the past 68 years. In 1993 the U.S. Army Russian Institute was replaced by the George C. Marshall European Center for Security Studies, and by 2004, all Armed Forces Recreation Center Hotel operations had been consolidated into the Edelweiss Lodge and Resort. Today, the George C. Marshall Center and NATO School provide essential forums for international military diplomacy, education and cooperation, while the Edelweiss Lodge and Resort has become the focal point for armed forces recreation in Europe. In July 2012, the support elements that had evolved over 68 years to become U.S. Army Garrison Garmisch inactivated, and Garmisch became a U.S. Army Garrison Bavaria community.

== Environmental damage ==
Areas around training sites are characterized by their diverse landscapes and rich variety of species. For 100 years, these areas have been intensively used as military training for various weapons and a large variety of types of ammunition. This training, along with technical developments and a carefree throw-away-mentality have left behind waste and pollution. Much of that was repaired over the past years.

Although efforts have been made to mitigate the negative impact of military training on surrounding environments, the economic impact of living in and around the training area remains a source of concern. The high levels of noise pollution from firing and flight activity, increased traffic, emissions, and rental prices, as well as a reliance on the military for economic stability, are among issues associated with this area.

== Units ==
=== Tower Barracks - Grafenwöhr ===
- Charlie Company 1-214 Aviation Battalion
- 7th Army Training Command
- 106th Financial Management Support Unit
- 18th Combat Sustainment Support Battalion
- 1st Inland Cargo Transfer Company
- 702nd Explosive Ordnance Disposal Company
- 44th Expeditionary Signal Battalion
- 1st Squadron, 91st Cavalry Regiment
- 4th Battalion, 319th Field Artillery Regiment
- 41st Field Artillery Brigade
- 15th Engineer Battalion
- 928th Contracting Battalion
- 534th Engineer Detachment
- 18th Military Police Brigade
- 709th Military Police Battalion
- 615th Military Police Company
- 131st Military Working Dog Detachment
- 457th Civilian Affairs Battalion
- 1172nd Movement Control Team
- 102nd Signal Battalion
- 66th Military Intelligence Brigade
- 39th Transportation Battalion
- 928th Contracting Battalion (Regional Contracting Office)
- 7th Weather Squadron, Detachment 2

=== Rose Barracks - Vilseck ===
- 2nd Cavalry Regiment
  - 1st Squadron, 2nd Cavalry Regiment
  - 2nd Squadron, 2nd Cavalry Regiment
  - 3rd Squadron, 2nd Cavalry Regiment
  - 4th Squadron, 2nd Cavalry Regiment
  - Regimental Engineer Squadron, 2nd Cavalry Regiment
  - Fires Squadron, 2nd Cavalry Regiment
  - Regimental Support Squadron, 2nd Cavalry Regiment
  - 2nd Cavalry Regiment Reed Museum
- 102nd Signal Battalion
- 2nd Air Support Operations Squadron
- 39th Transportation Battalion
- Medical Department Activity Bavaria Headquarters

=== Hohenfels ===
- 1st Battalion, 4th Infantry Regiment
- 4th Platoon, 3rd Battalion, 58th Aviation Regiment
- 527th MP Company

=== Garmisch ===
- George C. Marshall European Center

== German American Volksfest ==
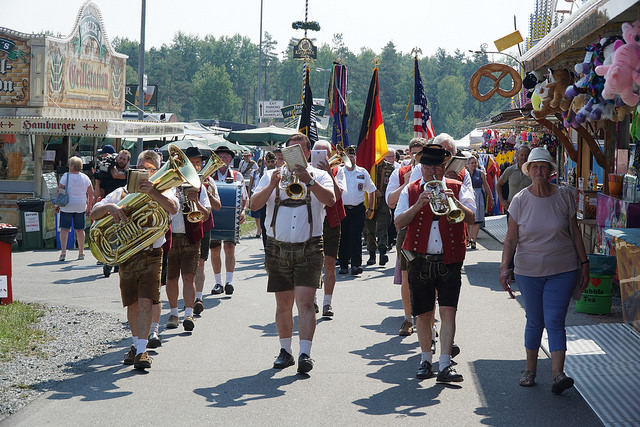
German American Volksfest

Every first weekend in August more than 100,000 people come to Camp Kasserine on the Grafenwöhr Training Area. For more than fifty years, the U.S. Army Garrison Bavaria and the German American Community Council (GACC) invite guests to celebrate the German American Volksfest. Many rides and booths, a large beer tent and a tent city with sales booths offering a large variety of international, culinary delicacies. Bands, music groups and performances entertain the guests. The main attraction is the large weapons display with German and American tanks and other military vehicles. 2018 marked the 60th anniversary of the German American Volksfest.

== Commanders ==
List of U.S. Army Garrison Bavaria Commanders
- COL Stephen C. Flanagan 2024 – present
- COL Kevin A. Poole 2022 – 2024
- COL Christopher R. Danbeck 2020 – 2022
- COL Adam J. Boyd 2018 – 2020
- COL Lance C. Varney 2016 – 2018
- COL Mark A. Colbrook 2014 – 2016
- COL James E. Saenz 2012 – 2014
- COL Avanulas R. Smiley 2010 – 2011
- COL Nils C. Sorenson 2008 – 2010
- COL Brian T. Boyle 2005 – 2008
- COL Richard G. Jung, Sr. 2002 – 2005
- COL Gregory J. Dyson 2000 – 2002
- COL Philip D. Coker 1997 – 2000
- COL Frank J. Gehrki III 1995 – 1997
- COL Gary M. Tobin 1993 – 1995
- COL James G. Snodgrass 1991 – 1993
- COL Nick C. Harris 1989 – 1991
- COL Washington J. Sanchez, Jr. 1987 – 1989
- * Commanders of the U.S. Army Garrison Bavaria (formerly 100th Area Support Group and U.S. Army Garrison Grafenwöhr)

== See also ==
- 7th Army Training Command
- 2nd Cavalry Regiment (United States)
