= Defender-Europe 21 =

Defender-Europe 21 was a large-scale, United States Army-led, multinational joint exercise designed to build readiness and interoperability between the United States, NATO and partner militaries. Taking place between mid-March and June, it was one of the largest United States Army, NATO-led military exercises in Europe in decades. More than 28,000 personnel from 26 nations conducted nearly simultaneous operations across more than 30 training areas in a dozen countries.

It included a greater number of NATO and partner nations conducting activities over a wider area than what was planned for in 2020. Defender-Europe 21 also included significant involvement of the United States Air Force and United States Navy. The exercise utilized key ground and maritime routes bridging Europe, Asia and Africa. It incorporated new or high-end capabilities including air and missile assets, as well as assets from the United States Army Security Force Assistance Brigades and the recently reactivated V Corps.

Gen. Christopher G. Cavoli, commanding general of the United States Army Europe and Africa, said that "While we are closely monitoring the COVID situation, we've proven we have the capability to train safely despite the pandemic." Russian Defense Minister Sergey Shoigu said that Russia has deployed troops to its western borders for "combat training exercises" in response to NATO "military activities that threaten Russia."
