= Christopher G. Cavoli =

United States Army general

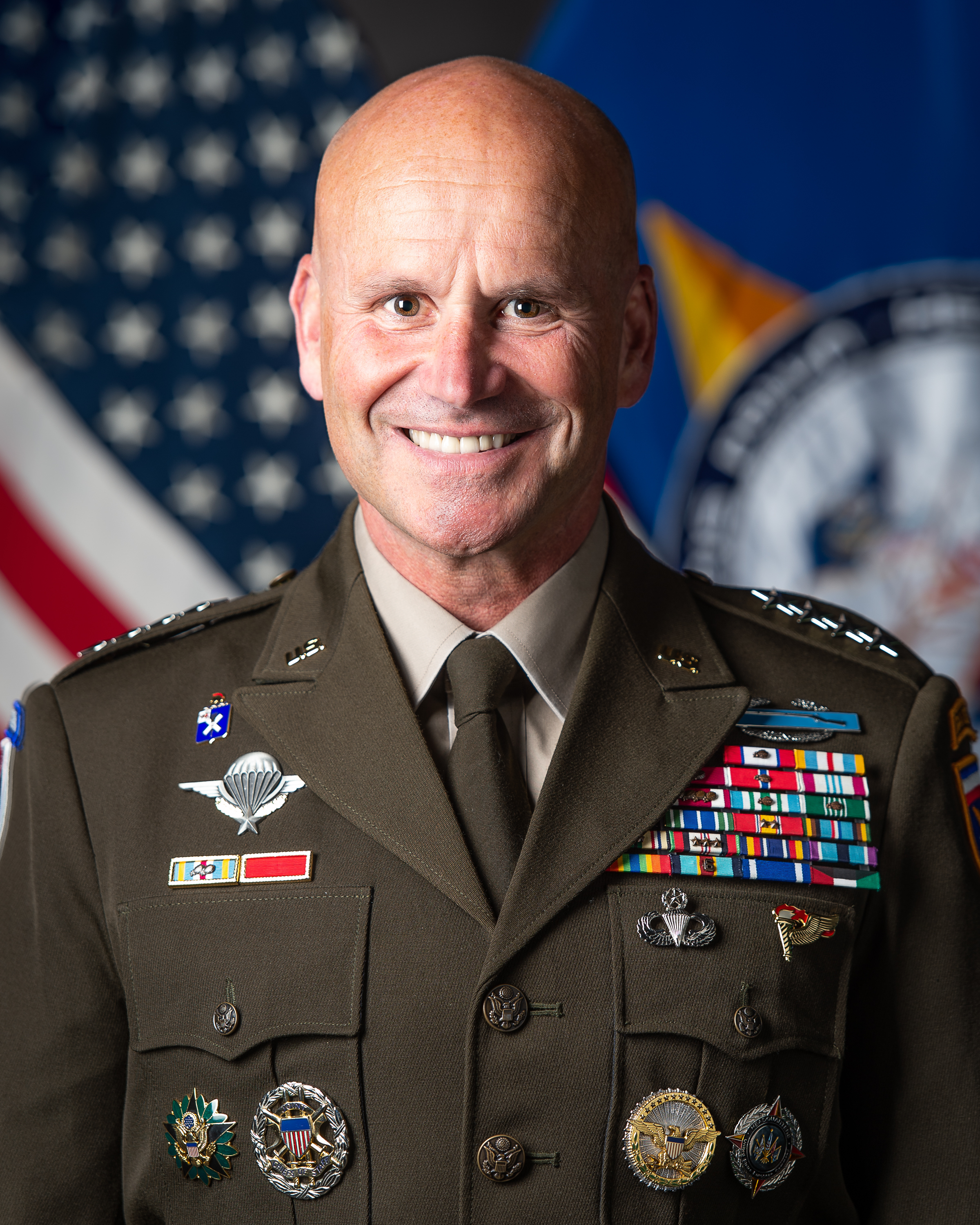
- Official portrait, 2022
- Born: 1964 or 1965; Würzburg, West Germany
- Allegiance: United States
- Branch: United States Army
- Service years: 1987–2025
- Rank: General
- Commands: United States European Command; Supreme Allied Commander Europe; United States Army Europe and Africa; 25th Infantry Division; 7th Army Joint Multinational Training Command; 3rd Brigade, 1st Armored Division; 1st Battalion, 32nd Infantry Regiment
- Conflicts: Gulf War; War in Afghanistan
- Awards: Army Distinguished Service Medal (2); Defense Superior Service Medal; Legion of Merit (3); Bronze Star Medal (2)
- Education: Princeton University (BA); Yale University (MA)
- Christopher G. Cavoli's voice Cavoli's opening statement at his confirmation hearing to be commander of U.S. European Command; Recorded 26 May 2022

Christopher Gerard Cavoli is a retired United States Army general who last served as the commander of United States European Command and Supreme Allied Commander Europe from 2022 to 2025. He previously served as the commanding general of United States Army Europe and Africa from 2020 to 2022, and before that as the commanding general of United States Army Europe from 2018 to 2020.

Commissioned into the infantry from the Reserve Officers' Training Corps, Cavoli served in the War in Afghanistan and commanded a brigade of the 1st Armored Division, the 7th Army Joint Multinational Training Command, and the 25th Infantry Division before assuming command of USAREUR in January 2018.

== Early years ==
Born in Sep 1964 to an Italian-American army officer during the Cold War in Würzburg, West Germany, Cavoli grew up in Rome, Verona, Vicenza, and Giessen. He graduated from Princeton University with a B.A. in biology in 1987. As part of his undergraduate degree, Cavoli completed a 22-page senior thesis titled "The Effect of Earthworms on the Vertical Distribution of Slime Molds in the Soil."

== Military career ==
Cavoli was commissioned into the Infantry from the Reserve Officers' Training Corps at Princeton. He was first assigned as a second lieutenant to the 3rd Battalion, 325th Airborne at Vicenza from 1988 to 1991.

Cavoli was promoted to captain and served as an instructor at Ranger School between 1992 and 1994.

He entered the Russian Foreign Area Officer program in 1995, and graduated from Yale University with a Master of Arts in Russian and East European Studies in 1997.

=== Peace Enforcement in Bosnia ===
In 1999, he became chief of future operations for the 10th Mountain Division as a major and deployed to Bosnia with Stabilisation Force, before serving as an infantry battalion operations officer between 2000 and 2001.

=== NDU professor of Russian studies ===
As a lieutenant colonel, Cavoli served successively as Director for Russia on the Joint Staff Strategic Plans and Policy Directorate from 2001, as deputy executive assistant for the Chairman of the Joint Chiefs of Staff from 2003, and became a senior fellow at the National Defense University in 2004.

=== Deployment to Afghanistan ===
Cavoli became commander of the 1st Battalion, 32nd Infantry Regiment of the 3rd Brigade Combat Team, 10th Mountain Division in 2005. The battalion deployed to Kunar Province during the War in Afghanistan with the brigade in 2006. He then commanded the 3rd Brigade Combat Team, 1st Armored Division, in addition to serving as the deputy commander of Regional Command West in Herat during the War in Afghanistan.

Cavoli also served as the director of the Coordination Group of the Chief of Staff of the United States Army.

He has held fellowships at the National Defense University, the George C. Marshall Center for European Security Studies in Garmisch-Partenkirchen, and the Strategic Studies Group of the Army Chief of Staff.

=== Service in Germany ===
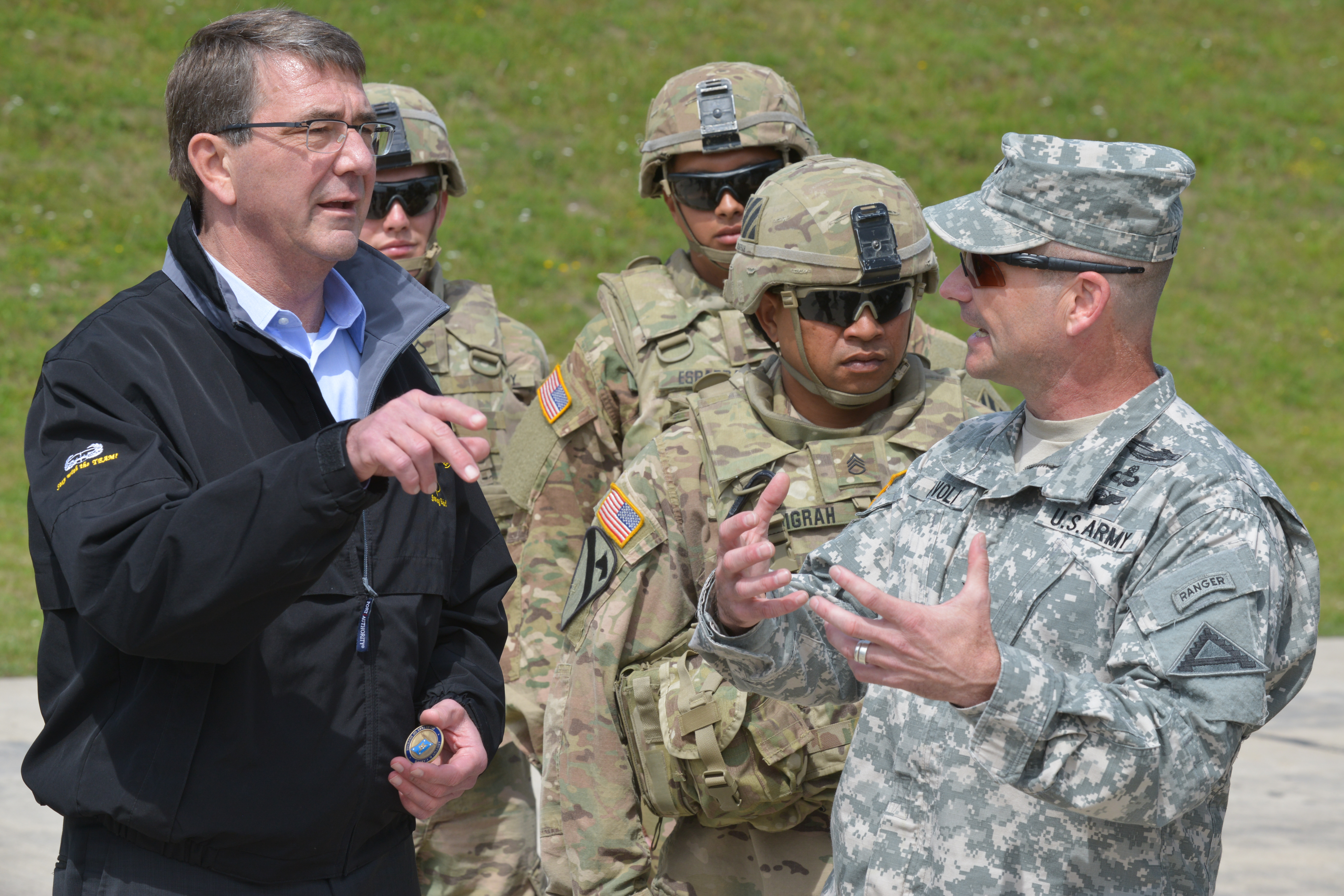
Secretary of Defense Ashton Carter and Cavoli in the Grafenwoehr Training Area, Germany on 26 June 2015

After serving as deputy commanding general for operations of the 82nd Airborne Division, Cavoli became commander of the 7th Army Joint Multinational Training Command at Grafenwoehr Training Area in July 2014.

He was assigned to command the 25th Infantry Division on 25 March 2016, and officially assumed command in a ceremony on 4 August. He was confirmed by the Senate for promotion to major general on 26 May 2016.

=== Command of US Army Europe ===
He assumed command of United States Army Europe in a ceremony on 18 January 2018 after being confirmed by the Senate for promotion to lieutenant general on 20 December 2017.

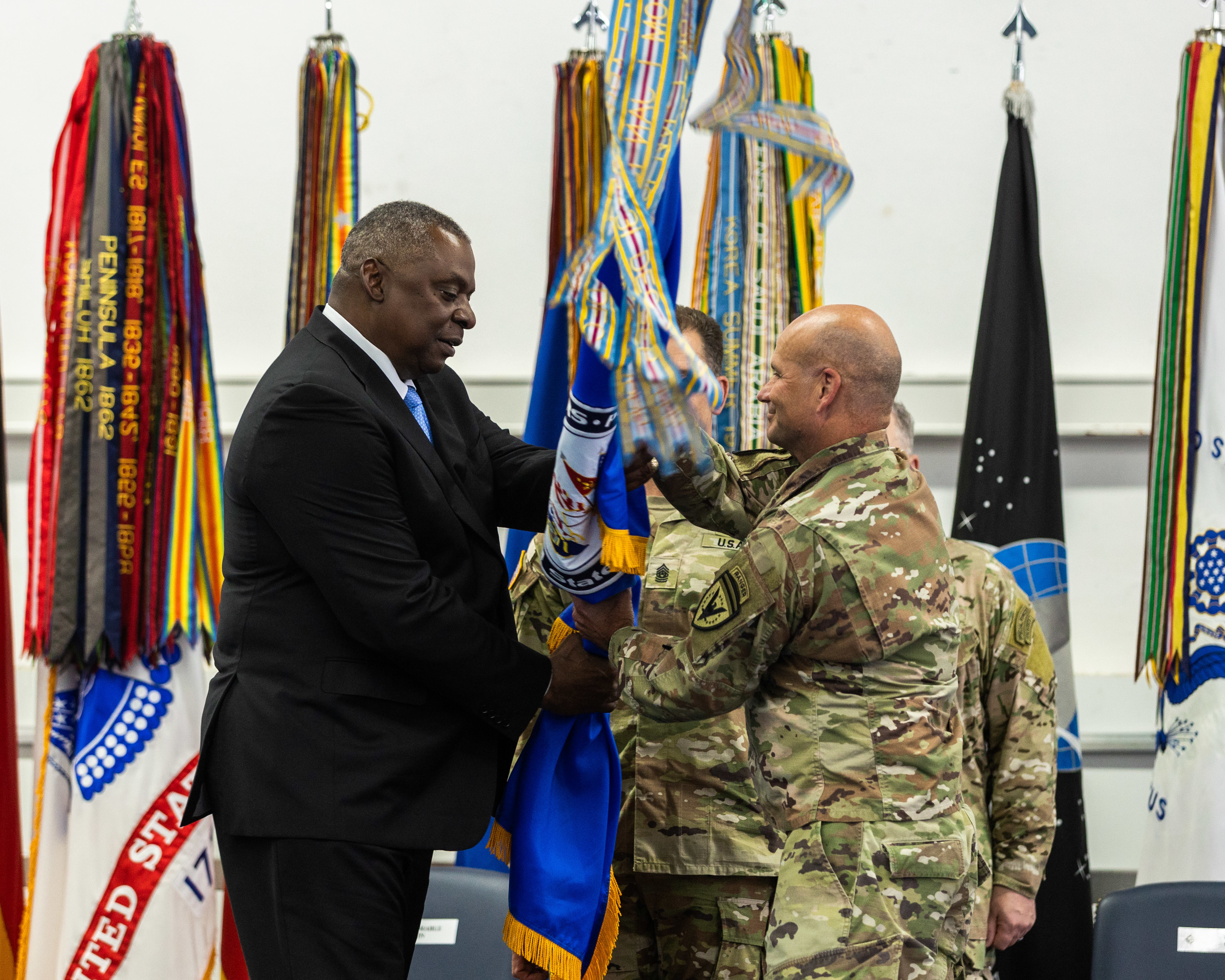
Cavoli assumes command of USEUCOM on 1 July 2022.

On 1 July 2020, Cavoli was nominated and confirmed by the Senate on 30 September 2020, for appointment to the rank of general, and assignment as the commanding general of United States Army Europe and Africa, combining the originally separate Army commands. He assumed his new command in Germany on 1 October 2020 and was formally promoted by Army Vice Chief of Staff Joseph M. Martin at the Pentagon on 7 October, with an effective date-of-rank on 1 October.

Defender-Europe 21, one of the largest U.S.-Army, NATO-led military exercises in Europe in decades, began in mid-March 2021 and lasted until June 2021. It included "nearly simultaneous operations across more than 30 training areas" in Estonia, Bulgaria, Romania, Kosovo and other countries. Cavoli said that "While we are closely monitoring the COVID situation, we’ve proven we have the capability to train safely despite the pandemic."

=== SACEUR ===
In May 2022, his nomination to succeed General Tod Wolters as commander of United States European Command and Supreme Allied Commander Europe was approved by the Senate. He assumed command on 4 July 2022. Secretary-General of NATO Jens Stoltenberg took the opportunity to remark on his "entirely new family of NATO defence plans" which had been approved at the 2022 NATO Madrid summit and said "You were quite simply the right leader, at the right post, at the right time." Cavoli is the author of a 4000-page plan to discuss at the 2023 Vilnius Summit for updating NATO's military commands and preparations. His top priorities during his tenure were overseeing assistance to Ukraine starting from the 2022 Russian invasion and implementing new NATO defense plans.

General Cavoli retired from the United States Army in July 2025 after a 38-year career, concluding his service as Supreme Allied Commander Europe (SACEUR) and Commander of U.S. European Command. His retirement was formalized during change of command ceremonies in Stuttgart, Germany, and Mons, Belgium, where he transferred command of both organizations to U.S. Air Force Gen. Alexus G. Grynkewich.

== Awards and decorations ==
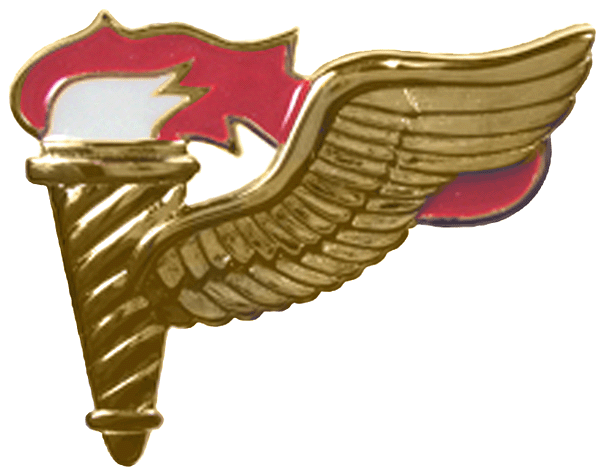
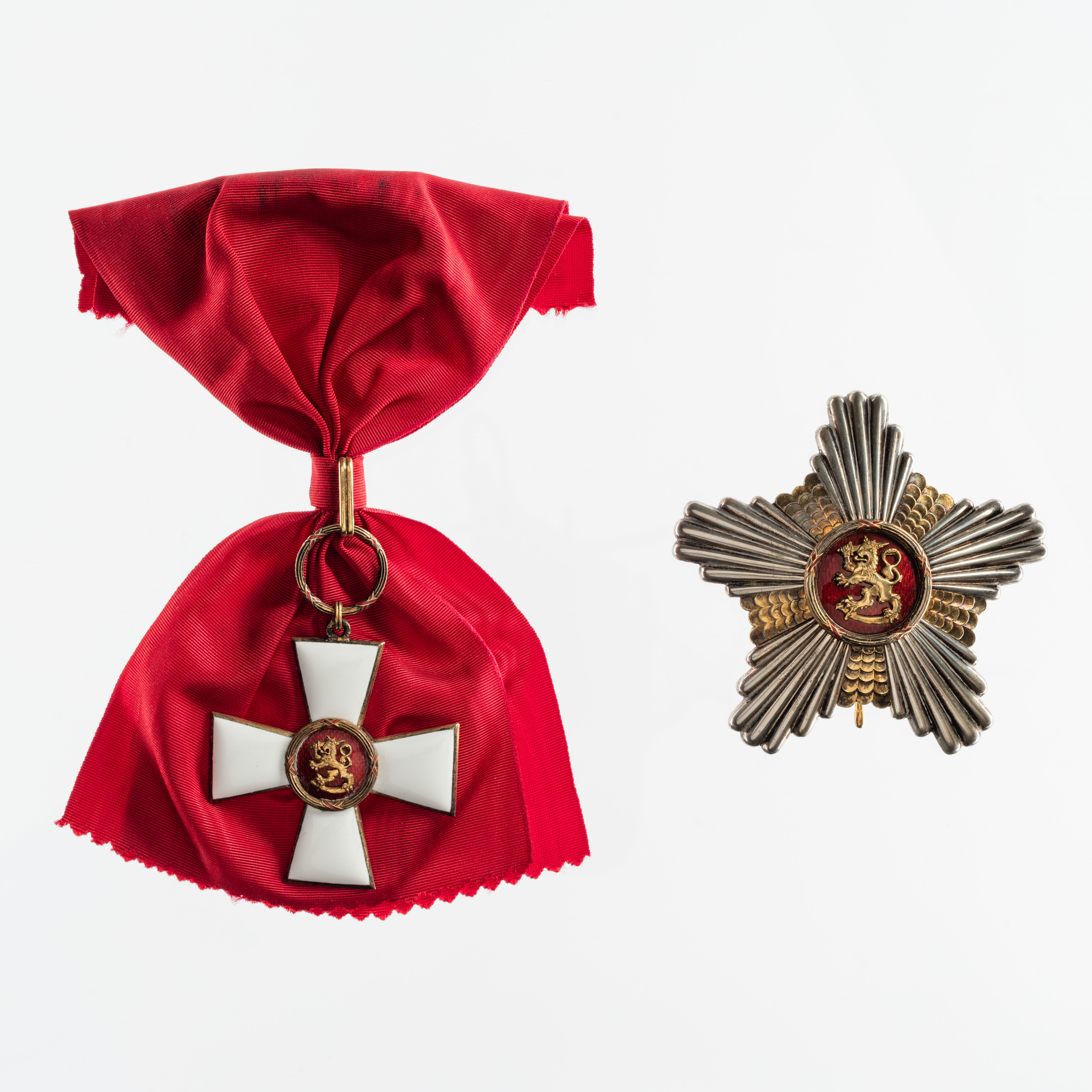
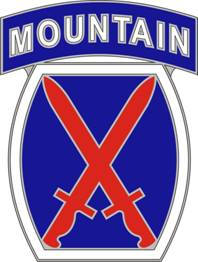
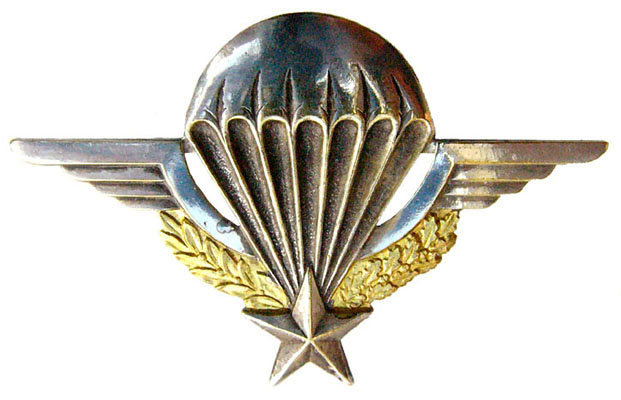
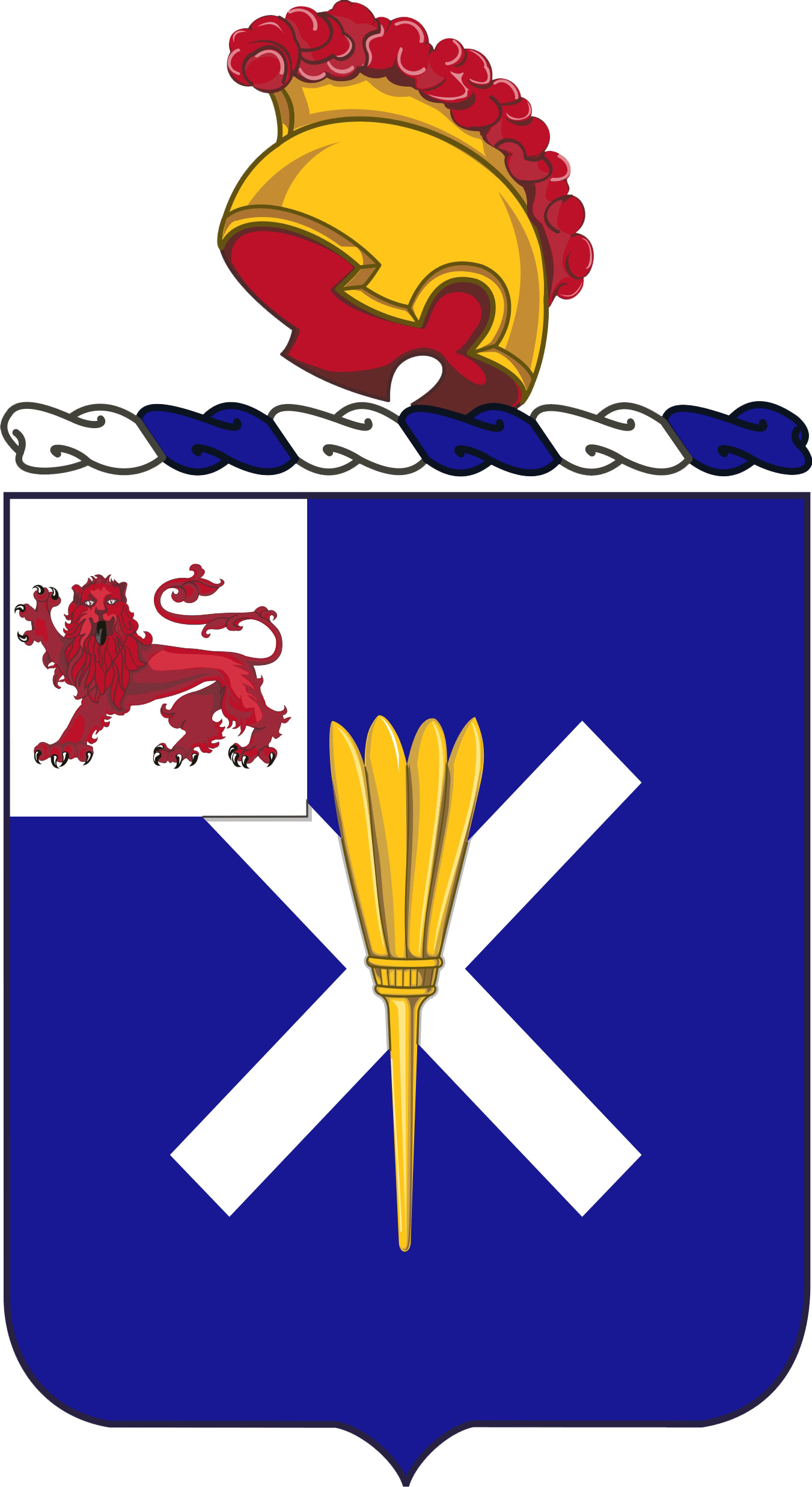
Combat Infantryman Badge
Ranger tab
Master Parachutist Badge
Pathfinder Badge
Order of the Lion of Finland Grand Cross
United States European Command Badge
Supreme Headquarters Allied Powers Europe Badge
Office of the Secretary of Defense Identification Badge
Joint Chiefs of Staff Identification Badge
Army Staff Identification Badge
10th Mountain Division Combat Service Identification Badge
French Parachutist Badge
Spanish Parachutist Badge in black
32nd Infantry Regiment Distinctive Unit Insignia
5 Overseas Service Bars

Army Distinguished Service Medal with one bronze oak leaf cluster
Defense Superior Service Medal
Legion of Merit with two oak leaf clusters
Bronze Star Medal with oak leaf cluster
Defense Meritorious Service Medal
Meritorious Service Medal with four oak leaf clusters
Joint Service Commendation Medal with oak leaf cluster
Army Commendation Medal with oak leaf cluster
Army Achievement Medal
Joint Meritorious Unit Award with two oak leaf clusters
Meritorious Unit Commendation
National Defense Service Medal with one bronze service star
Armed Forces Expeditionary Medal
Southwest Asia Service Medal with two service stars
Afghanistan Campaign Medal with three service stars
Global War on Terrorism Service Medal
Humanitarian Service Medal
Army Service Ribbon
Army Overseas Service Ribbon with bronze award numeral 6
NATO Medal for the former Yugoslavia
Kuwait Liberation Medal (Kuwait)
Commander of the Order for Merits to Lithuania (27 March 2023)
Grand Cross of Naval Merit (with white distinctive) (Spain) (2024)
Commander's Cross with Star of the Order of Merit of the Republic of Poland (Poland) (2024)
1st Class of the Order of the Cross of the Eagle (Estonia) (2025)
Grand Officer of the Order of the Star of Romania (for militaries, with peace distinctive) (Romania) (2025)
Norwegian Defence Service Medal with Laurel Branch

== Personal life ==
Cavoli is married with two sons, Alex and Nick. A speaker of French, Italian, and Russian, he is a Foreign Area Officer with a concentration on Eurasia.

Military offices
Preceded by Walter E. Piatt	Commanding General of the 7th Army Joint Multinational Training Command; 2014–2016	Succeeded by Antonio Aguto
Preceded by Charles A. Flynn	Commanding General of the 25th Infantry Division; 2016–2018	Succeeded by Ronald P. Clark
Preceded by Timothy P. McGuire; Acting	Commanding General of United States Army Europe and Africa; 2018–2022	Succeeded by Darryl A. Williams
Preceded by Tod D. Wolters	Commander of the United States European Command; Supreme Allied Commander Europe; 2022–2025	Succeeded by Alexus Grynkewich
