= Hohenfels, Bavaria =

Hohenfels
- Municipality
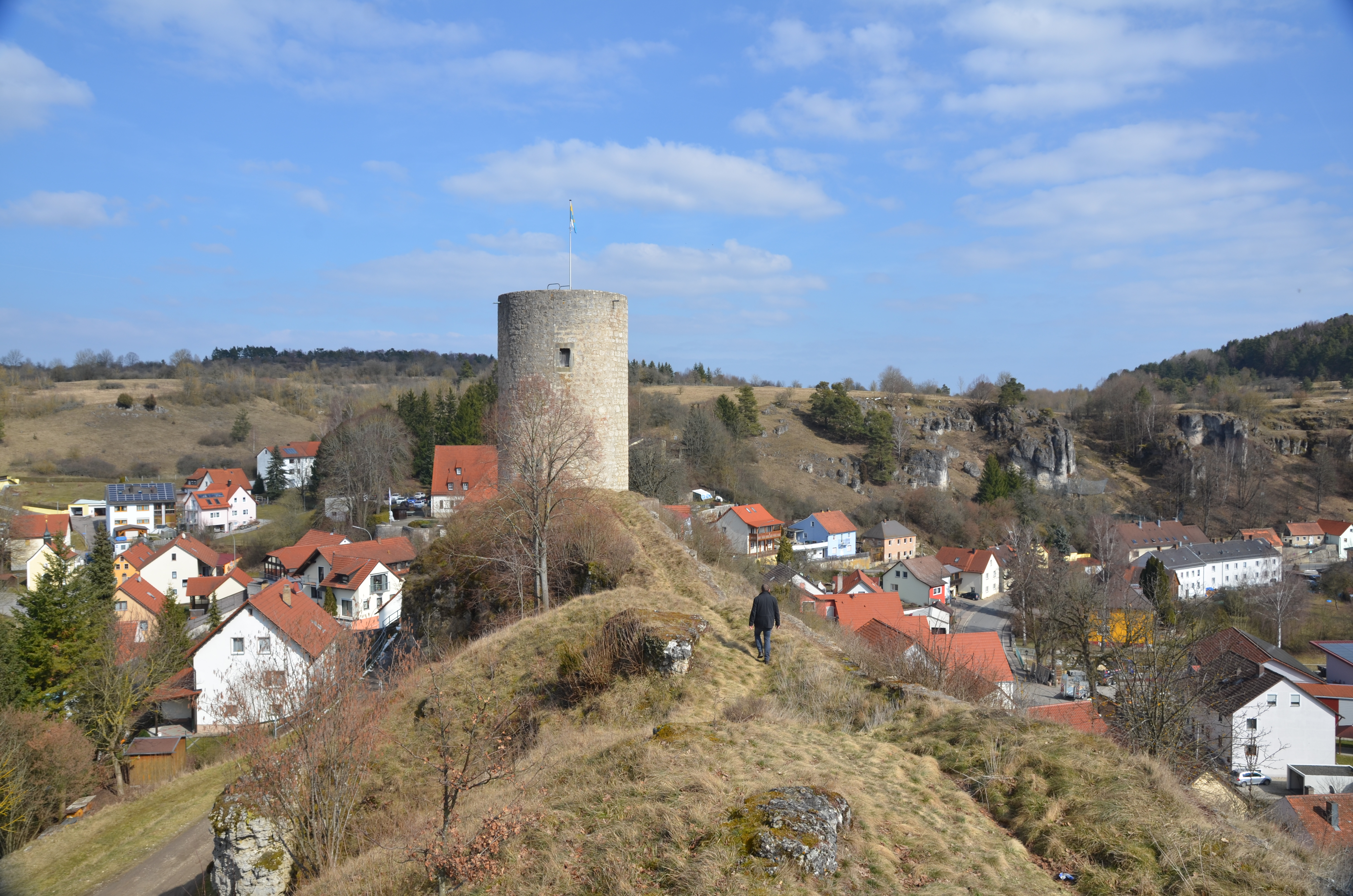
- Hohenfels Castle

- Coat of arms

- Location of Hohenfels within Neumarkt in der Oberpfalz district
- Interactive map of Hohenfels
- Location within Germany Location within Bavaria
- Coordinates: 49°12′N 11°51′E
- Country: Germany
- State: Bavaria
- Admin. region: Upper Palatinate
- District: Neumarkt in der Oberpfalz
- Subdivisions: 4 Ortsteile: Hohenfels, Großbissendorf, Markstetten, Raitenbuch

Government
  - Mayor (2020–26): Christian Graf (Ind.)

Area
  - Total: 137.07 km^{2} (52.92 sq mi)
- Elevation: 390 m (1,280 ft)

Population (2025-12-31)
  - Total: 2,295
  - Density: 16.74/km^{2} (43.36/sq mi)
- Time zone: UTC+01:00 (CET)
  - Summer (DST): UTC+02:00 (CEST)
- Postal codes: 92366
- Dialling codes: 09472
- Vehicle registration: NM, PAR
- Website: www.markt-hohenfels.de

Hohenfels (German pronunciation: [ˈhoːənfɛls], lit. 'High Cliffs') is a municipality in the district of Neumarkt in the region of Upper Palatinate (German: Oberpfalz) in Bavaria, Germany. The town is host to the United States Army Garrison Hohenfels, which operates the Joint Multinational Readiness Center for training of North Atlantic Treaty Organization (NATO) armed forces.

== Military ==
The German Army founded a training area in Hohenfels in 1938.

During World War II there was a POW camp there, Stalag 383. On April 24, 1945, Major General Stanley Eric Reinhart's 65th Infantry Division captured Hohenfels. Major General Gustav Geiger, staff, and guards surrendered. The POW camp with numerous British inmates was liberated.

Later, between 1945-1949 the site became a displaced persons camp.

=== United States Garrison Hohenfels ===
In 1951, Hohenfels became a training area for the United States military and was used primarily by United States armed forces until 1956. In 1955, the German Bundeswehr was founded, and in 1956 the first German unit was stationed in Camp Poellnricht (i.e. Lager Pöllnricht). From 1956 to 1988, the Hohenfels Training Area was used by NATO forces consisting primarily of American, German, Canadian, and occasionally British and French forces. The "Box", as the training area is nicknamed, is roughly 46,000 acres in size. Located within the training are four mock "townsets" that train MOUT and civil operations. These sites include billet areas where role players portray anything from regular residents of the town to the Mayor and Police Chief.

=== Combat Maneuver Training Center ===
In 1988, Hohenfels became the home of the Combat Maneuver Training Center (CMTC), the mission of which was to provide realistic combined arms training for the United States Army, Europe, and Seventh Army's maneuver battalion task forces in force-on-force exercises.

Exercises revolved around the fictional nation of Danubia and its three provinces of friendly Sowenia, hostile Vilslakia, and neutral Jursland. The opposing force was the fictional army of Danubia. The 1st Battalion, 4th Infantry Regiment represented the "4th Guards Motorized Rifle Regiment". M113A2s were used to replicate Soviet BMP-2 IFVs and M60A3 tanks were used to replicate Soviet T-80 tanks.

=== Joint Multinational Readiness Center ===
In December 2005, the CMTC was transformed and officially renamed the Joint Multinational Readiness Center (JMRC), part of the Joint Multinational Training Center (JMTC), which oversees training of all of United States Army Europe (USAREUR).Today, JMRC continues to conduct numerous training exercises with NATO allies and partners. Typically, 6-8 major training exercises are executed, each lasting roughly 20 days.

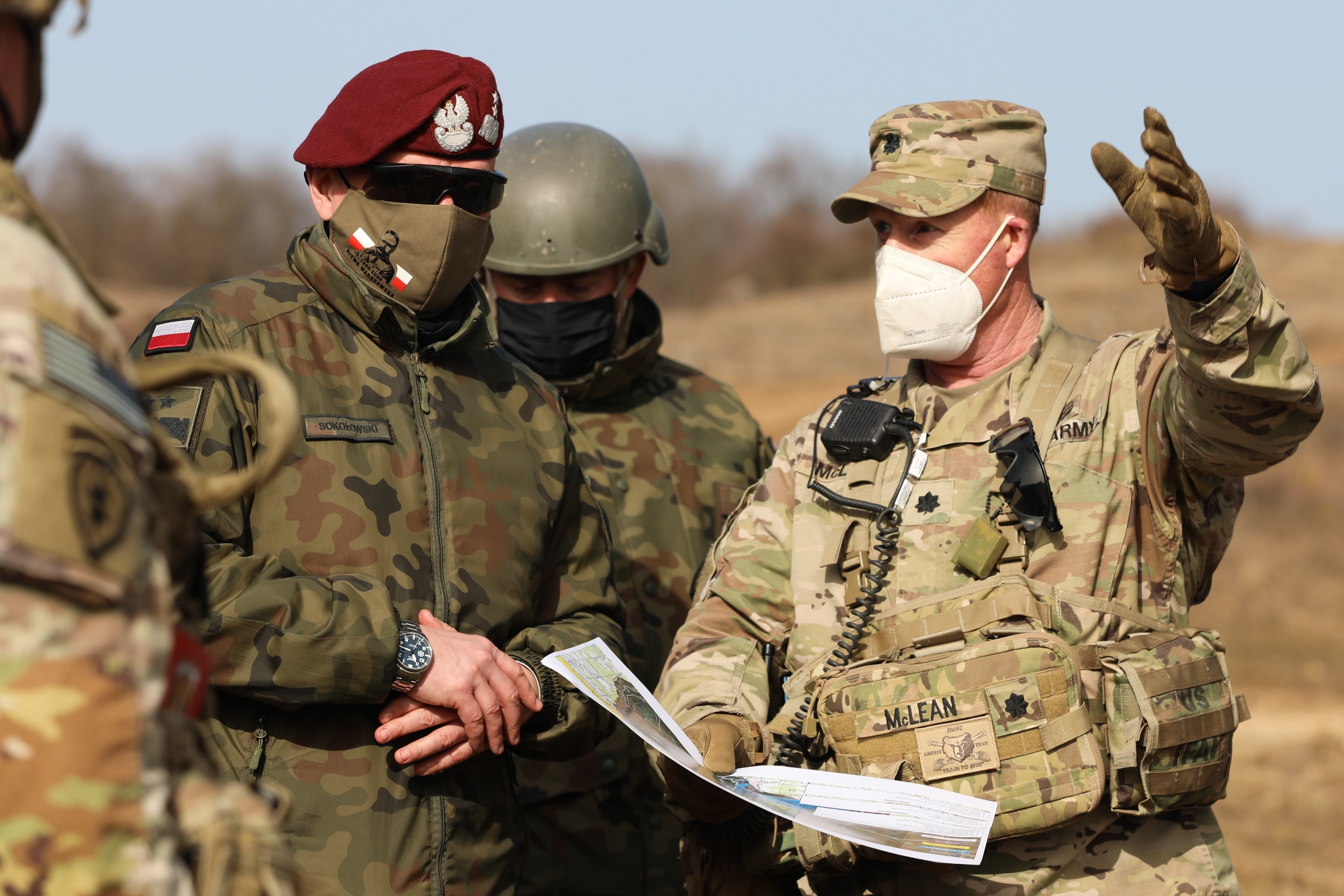
Lt. Col. McLean briefs Polish Maj. Gen. Marek Sokolowski at exercise at JMRC, Hohenfels, Germany

== See also ==
- Grafenwöhr
