= David R. Hogg =

United States Army general

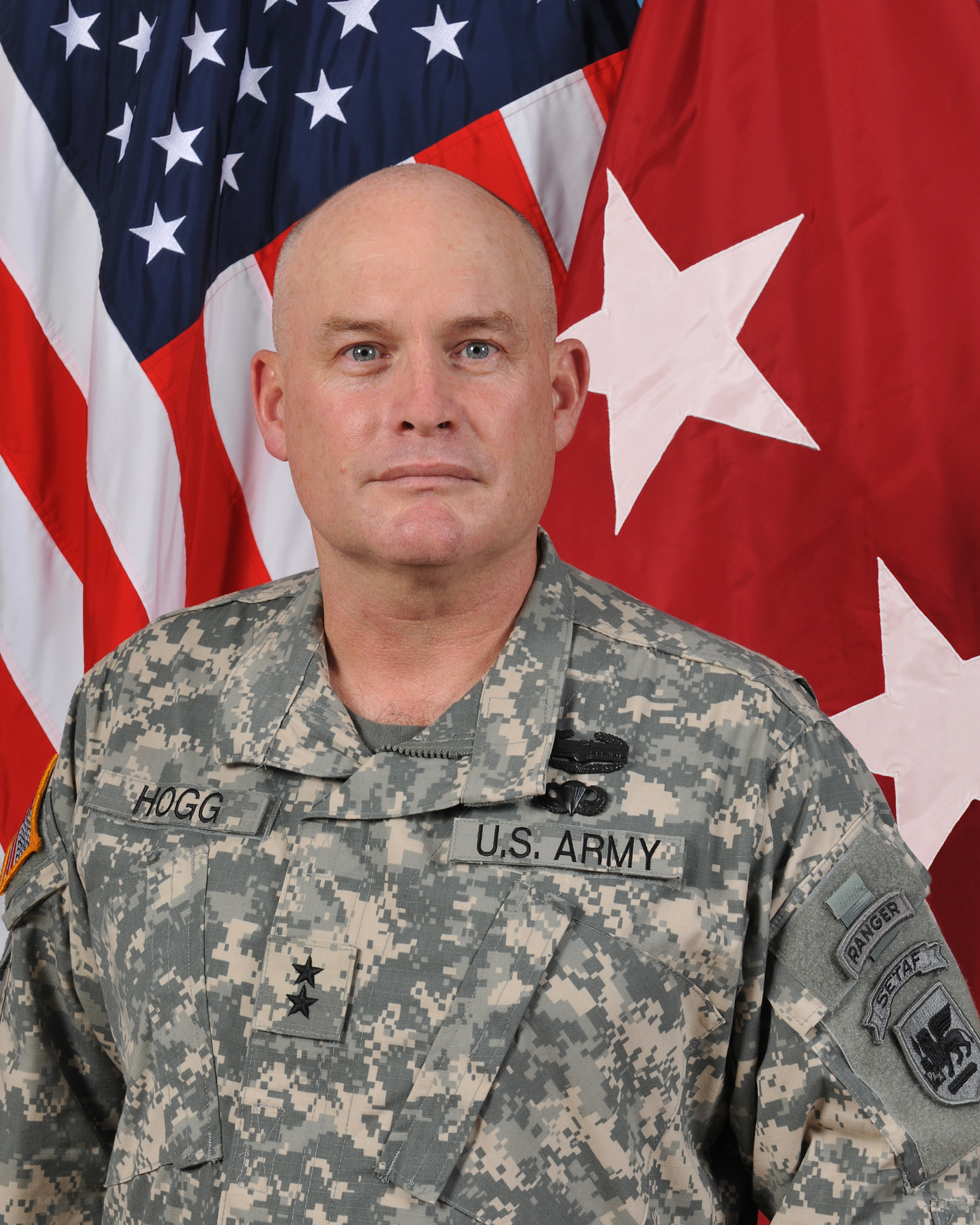
- Lieutenant General David R. Hogg (as Major General/Commander, U.S. Army Africa)
- Born: December 1, 1958 (age 67); Idaho, United States
- Military career
- Allegiance: United States of America
- Branch: United States Army
- Service years: 1981 – 2015
- Rank: Lieutenant General

Lieutenant General David Richard Hogg (born December 1, 1958) is a retired United States Army officer. He served as a United States Military Representative to the NATO Military Committee (USMILREP). He relieved Vice Admiral Richard K. Gallagher and assumed the assignment in 2012. He retired in 2015. Prior to the assignment, General Hogg served as the Commanding General of United States Army Africa (USARAF) from June 10, 2010, to August 3, 2012.

In a previous assignment, Hogg was the senior U.S. Army officer in Italy and commanded the Army component to United States Africa Command (USAFRICOM).

== Military career ==
Hogg was commissioned as an Armor Officer after graduating from the United States Military Academy. His assignments include:

- Tank platoon leader and executive officer, C Company, 2-63 Armor, 1st Infantry Division, Fort Riley, Kansas;
- Delta Company and HHC Commander in 5-77 Armor, 8th Infantry Division, Mannheim, Germany;
- Company/Team Observer-Controller at the National Training Center, Fort Irwin, California;
- Battalion Commander, 2-37 Armor (Iron Dukes), 1st Armored Division, Friedberg, Germany;
- Commander, 2nd Brigade Combat Team (Warhorse), 4th Infantry Division, Fort Hood, Texas (OIF 1);
- Commander, Operations Group, Fort Irwin, California; Assistant Division Commander-Support, 1st Armored Division, Baumholder, Germany;
- Commanding General, 7th U.S. Army, Joint Multinational Training Command (JMTC).

Hogg was previously the Deputy Commanding General, Combined Security Transition Command – Afghanistan.

Hogg is a graduate of the Armor Officer Basic and Advanced Courses, Airborne and Ranger Schools, Combined Arms and Services Staff School, US Army Command and General Staff College, School of Advanced Strategic Arts program, and United States Army War College. He holds a master's degree in Military Arts and Science and in National Security Strategy.

== Awards ==
Hogg's awards include the Legion of Merit, Bronze Star Medal with “V” device, Defense Meritorious Service Medal and Army Meritorious Service Medal, Kosovo Campaign Medal, NATO Medal, and Combat Action Badge. Unit awards include the Valorous Unit Award, Joint Meritorious Unit award, and the Army Superior Unit award. Hogg was awarded the Defense Distinguished Service Medal by General Philip Breedlove at his retirement ceremony on September 15, 2015.

== See also ==
- Combined Joint Task Force – Horn of Africa
- Operation Enduring Freedom – Horn of Africa
