= United States Army Europe and Africa =

Army service component command (ASCC)/theater army of the United States

- Shoulder sleeve insignia
- Active: 1942–present
- Country: United States
- Branch: Army
- Type: Army Service Component Command/Theater Army
- Part of: United States Army; European Command; Africa Command
- Headquarters: Lucius D. Clay Kaserne, Germany
- Motto: Sword of Freedom
- Colors: White and red
- Campaigns: World War II; Sicily; Rome-Arno; Northern France; Southern France (with arrowhead); Rhineland; Ardennes-Alsace; Central Europe
- Website: www.europeafrica.army.mil

Commanders
- Commanding General: Maj. Gen. Christopher Norrie (acting)
- Deputy Commanding General: Maj. Gen. Christopher Norrie
- Command Sergeant Major: Command Sgt. Maj Christopher L. Mullinax

Insignia
- Distinctive unit insignia

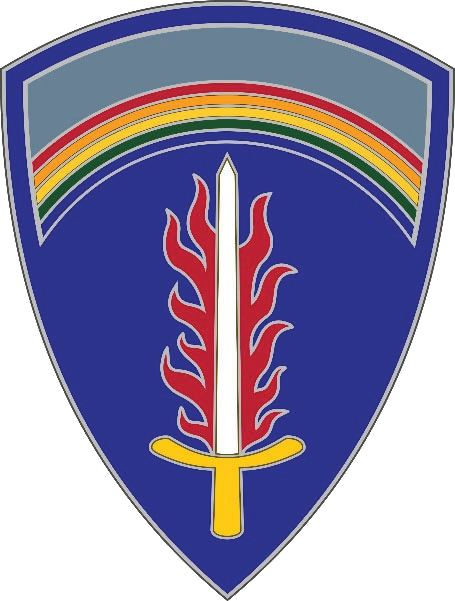
- Combat service identification badge

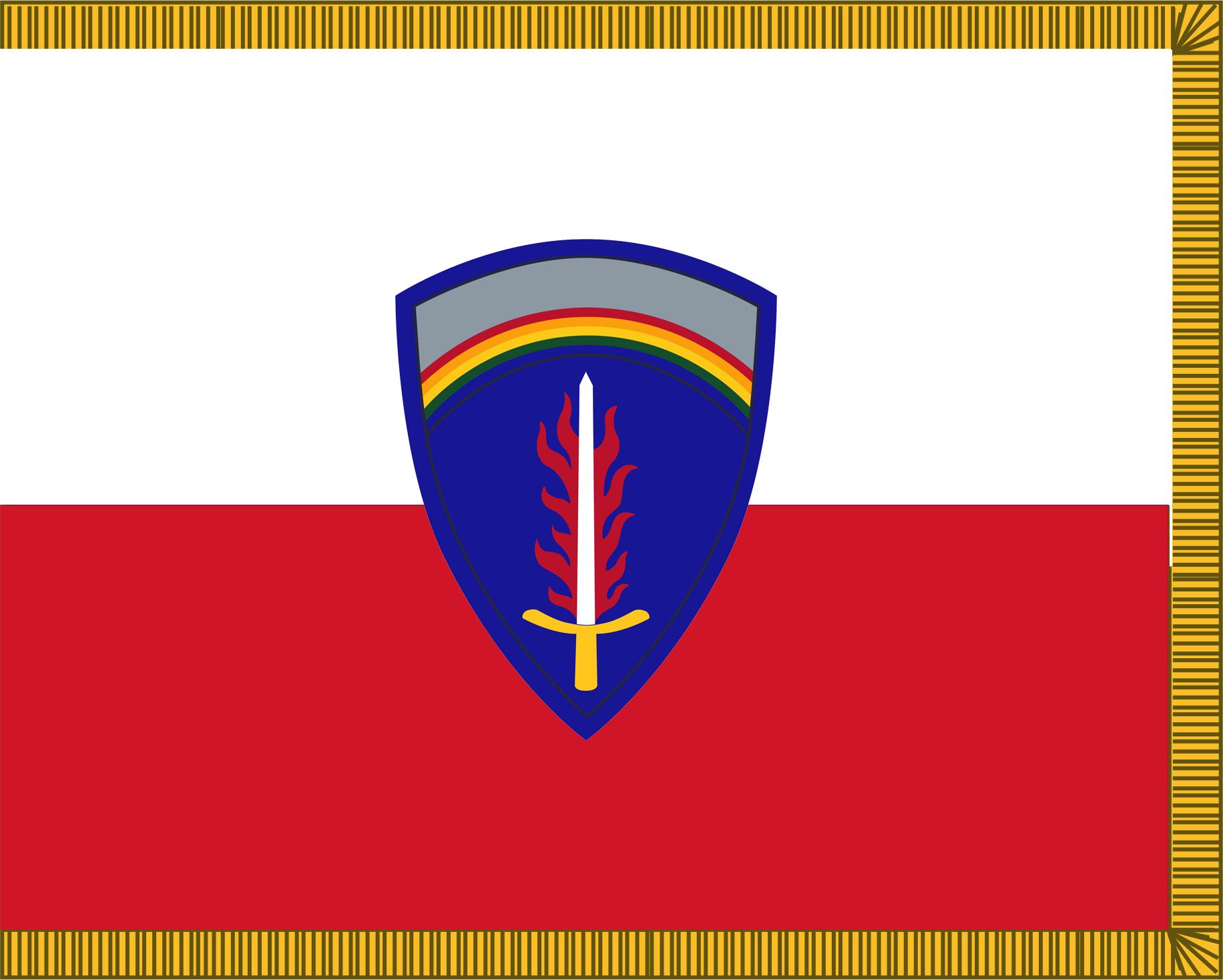
- Flag

- NATO map symbol (1997)
- Abbreviation: USAREUR-AF

United States Army Europe and Africa (USAREUR-AF) is an Army Service Component Command/Theater Army responsible for directing United States Army operations throughout the United States European Command and United States Africa Command (AFRICOM) area of responsibility.

During the Cold War, it supervised ground formations primarily focused upon the Warsaw Pact to the east as part of NATO's Central Army Group. Since the revolutions of 1989, it has greatly reduced its size, dispatched U.S. forces to the Persian Gulf War, the 2003 invasion of Iraq, the Kosovo War, the war in Afghanistan and increased security cooperation with other NATO land forces. From 1967 to 2006, the U.S. Army Europe dual hatted with the Seventh Army. The Seventh Army has since been dissolved and merged into the command.

On October 1. 2020, the Army announced that United States Army Africa would consolidate with U.S. Army Europe to form a new command, U.S. Army Europe and Africa. The two commands were consolidated on November 20, 2020.

== History ==
=== World War II ===
The European Theater of Operations, United States Army (ETOUSA) was a Theater of Operations responsible for directing United States Army operations throughout the European theatre of World War II from 1942 to 1945. It commanded U.S. Army Ground Forces, U.S. Army Air Forces, and U.S. Army Service Forces operations north of Italy and the Mediterranean coast. It was bordered to the south by the North African Theater of Operations, US Army (NATOUSA), which later became the Mediterranean Theater of Operations (MTOUSA).

When the war ended in Europe on 8 May 1945, the ETOUSA headquarters was located in Versailles, France, just outside Paris. As Eisenhower and his staff began to prepare for the occupation of Germany, the ETOUSA headquarters staff moved to Frankfurt, Germany. In Frankfurt the staff was co-located with the Supreme Headquarters Allied Expeditionary Forces and the Office of Military Government, United States. ETOUSA was redesignated Headquarters, United States Forces European Theater (HQ USFET) on 1 July 1945, remaining in Frankfurt.

At the end of the war, the total U.S. Army strength in Europe was 2.4 million: two Army groups (6th and 12th), five field armies (First, Third, Seventh, Ninth and Fifteenth), 13 corps headquarters, and 62 combat divisions (43 infantry, 16 armor, and 3 airborne). There were 11,000 tanks and armored fighting vehicles. Within a year rapid redeployments had brought the occupation forces down to fewer than 290,000 personnel, and many of the larger formations had departed or been inactivated.

The Seventh Army headquarters remained in control of the western portion of the American zone, and the Third Army controlled the eastern portion. In November 1945, the two field army commanders organized district "constabularies" based on cavalry groups. The Seventh Army was inactivated in March 1946, in Germany. On 1 May 1946, the zone-wide United States Constabulary headquarters was activated at Bamberg. In mid-1946, the tactical units consisted of the Third Army (Heidelberg) with three infantry divisions (1st, 3rd and 9th) and several separate regiments (3rd, 14th, 29th and 508th Airborne). The 3rd Infantry Division was in the process of being redeployed back to the United States. Another separate infantry regiment – the 5th – was located in Austria but came under the control of US Forces in Austria. In 1947 Headquarters Third Army returned to the United States. From then until the early 1950s, the structure of the American occupation forces consisted of the 1st Infantry Division, a separate infantry regiment, and the U.S. Constabulary of 10 cavalry regiments.

From c.1947 to 1954, the 351st Infantry Regiment served as the main body of Trieste United States Troops, on the border of Yugoslavia.

=== Cold War ===
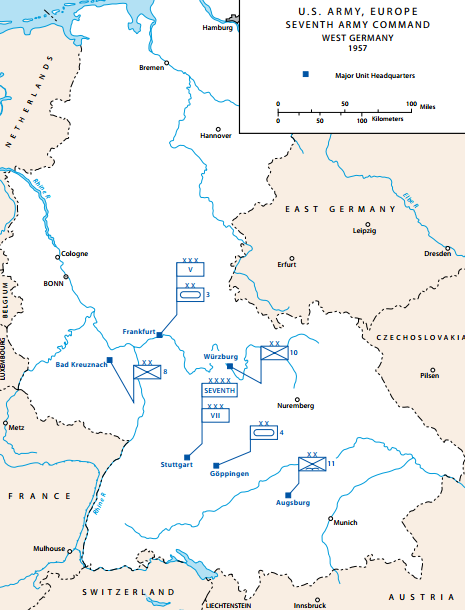
Major Unit Headquarters of U.S. Army Europe, 1957

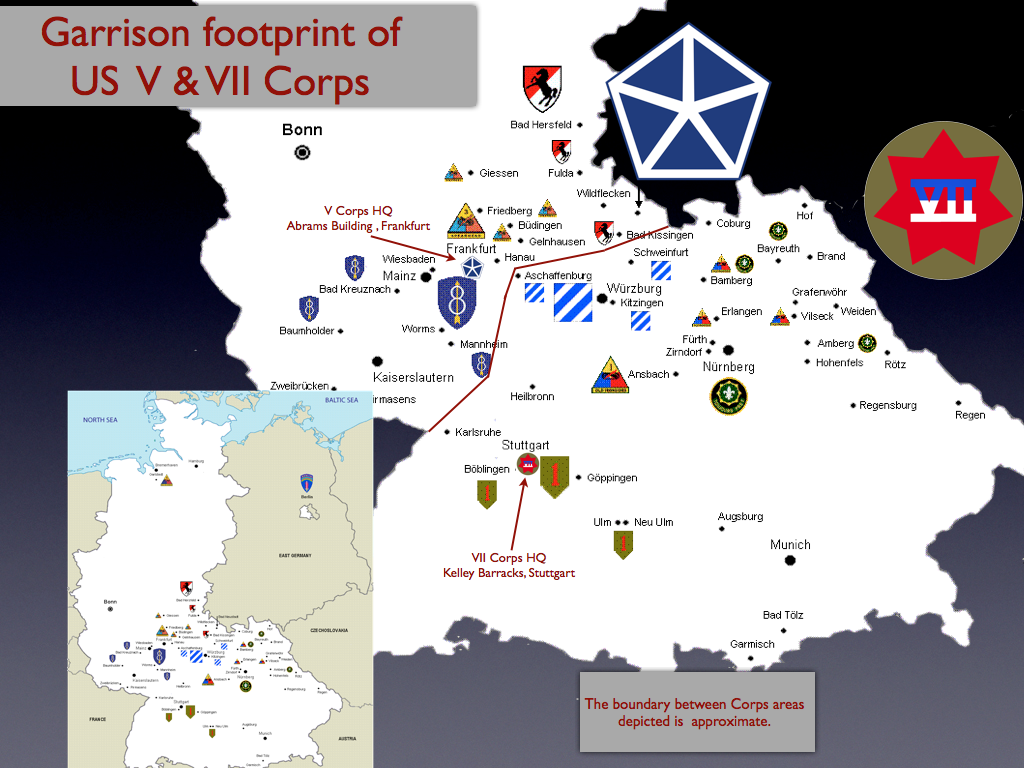
V & VII Corps USAREUR Garrisons in the 1980s

On 15 March 1947, United States Forces, European Theater (USFET) was "replaced by the army command known as European Command (EUCOM). ..The Army element of the joint European Command headquarters was initially called Headquarters, U.S. Ground and Service Forces, Europe."

On 15 March 1947, HQ USFET was formally redesignated Headquarters, European Command (HQ EUCOM) (not to be confused with the present joint command, "USEUCOM", which was formed on 1 August 1952). Between February and June 1948 the headquarters relocated to Campbell Barracks in Heidelberg, where it remained until June 2013. The Army element of the joint European Command headquarters was initially called Headquarters, U.S. Ground and Service Forces, Europe.

On 15 November 1947, U.S. Ground and Service Forces, Europe, was renamed U.S. Army, Europe (USAREUR) to accord with the new Department of the Army nomenclature for such commands. USAREUR was a nonoperational, "paper" organization that provides the ground and service commander with the command functions required for administrative and logistical support. To it were assigned all ground and service units in the command except those assigned to the Office of Military Government, United States; to the Office of the Commander in Chief of European Command; to U.S. Air Forces Europe; to the U.S. Navy, Germany; and to a few exempted War Department agencies. The offices and personnel of the general and special staff divisions of EUCOM headquarters performed USAREUR's general and special staff duties. The principal function of the commanding general of USAREUR became the establishment and maintenance of high standards of discipline. General Huebner also became Commanding General, USAREUR.

The Berlin Blockade began 24 June 1948 when the Soviet Union blocked the Western Allies' railway and road access to the sectors of Berlin under Allied control. Even though Allied forces in the city were outnumbered 50–1, General Lucius D. Clay, in charge of the US Occupation Zone in Germany, gave the order for the Berlin Airlift. Headquartered out of Wiesbaden Army Airfield, the Allies supplied almost 9,000 tons per day of supplies to the beleaguered city until the blockade was lifted on 12 May 1949.

From 1948 to 1950, Cold War tensions grew, and the outbreak of hostilities in Korea in June 1950 heightened east–west tensions in Europe. The Seventh Army was reactivated at Vaihingen, Stuttgart in late November 1950. The two U.S. Army division sized units in the U.S. Occupation Zone of Germany, the First Infantry Division and the U.S. Constabulary, were assigned to the Seventh Army. Within a few weeks other assignments to the Seventh Army included the V and VII Corps. Due to President Truman's 10 December 1950 Declaration of a National Emergency as a result of circumstances in the Korean War, four CONUS based U.S. Army divisions were alerted to move to the U.S. Occupation Zone of Germany (these divisions were known as the augmentation force to the U.S. Army in Europe). A main concern was possible Soviet attempts to "take advantage" due to their numerical superiority in Germany during the Korean War. The first augmentation division to arrive overseas in Germany was the 4th Infantry Division in May 1951, followed by the 2nd Armored Division and the 43rd and 28th Infantry Divisions during summer and fall of 1951.

On 24 November 1950 EUCOM activated HHC Seventh United States Army at Stuttgart to take over the command of the ground and service forces from USAREUR, while other USAREUR functions revert to EUCOM. General Eddy became CG of Seventh Army. HQ USAREUR continued to exist, without troops, to fulfilled certain legal requirements in connection with court-martial and other responsibilities.

A new joint, multi-service United States European Command was established in Frankfurt, Germany on 1 August 1952. General Matthew B. Ridgway became commander and Gen. Thomas T. Handy deputy commander. On that day, the U.S. Army headquarters at Heidelberg, formerly known as EUCOM, became Headquarters, United States Army, Europe. It remained in Heidelberg under the temporary command of General Handy (who wore two hats in both USEUCOM and USAREUR for a while). As Cold War tensions continued to escalate in 1952, General Williston B. Palmer commanding the 2nd Armored Division authorized the founding of the Seventh Army Symphony Orchestra in Vaihingen-Stuttgart under the direction of Samuel Adler in support of U.S. cultural diplomacy throughout Europe.

In 1953, the Korean War Armistice was signed, and tensions began to ease in Europe. About 13,500 soldiers manned each of the USAREUR divisions. New equipment fielded at the time included the M48 tank, the M59 armored personnel carrier, and tactical nuclear weapons. On 25 October 1955, the Southern Europe Task Force (SETAF), a logistical command, was formally activated in Italy. The headquarters, commanded by Maj. Gen. John H. Michaelis, was temporarily established at Camp Darby, near Livorno, Italy with units additionally stationed in Vicenza and Verona. Shortly after activation, SETAF moved the headquarters to Caserma Passalacqua in Verona, Italy. An airborne battalion eventually joined SETAF.

On 15 July 1958 USAREUR forces were ordered to assist the Lebanese government. Task Force 201, the Army component of Operation Blue Bat rapidly deployed more than 8,000 Soldiers from Europe to Beirut by air and sea. As the situation quickly stabilized, all U.S. forces redeployed from the country within 4 months.

Although the Korean War – open East–West conflict – had ended, political tensions remained high in Europe. Particularly troublesome was the impasse over the Federal Republic of Germany (West Germany, the former British, French and U.S. zones of occupation) and the German Democratic Republic (East Germany, the former Soviet zone of occupation). East Germany [the DDR] was considered by many countries over the years to be nothing more than the Soviet Zone of Occupation; this changed in 1973 with the UN recognition of both Germanies.

Berlin posed an additional problem; it was surrounded by East Germany, but Great Britain, France, the United States, and the Soviet Union all occupied sectors in the city. In the early years, travel between the sectors was unrestricted. At the time Soviet premier Nikita Khrushchev announced in June 1961 that the Soviet Union was planning to conclude a peace treaty with the East German government, 3,000 East German refugees flowed daily into Berlin.

Suddenly on the night of 12 August 1961, the Soviets closed the border crossing points and began to construct the Berlin Wall, isolating the three western sectors of the city both from East Germany and the Soviet sector, or East Berlin. In response, the United States deployed an additional armored cavalry regiment to Europe, along with additional support units. USAREUR strength reached a post-World War II high of 277,342 in June 1962 as the crisis deepened. That 1946–1991 Cold War maximum USAREUR troop record gradually reduced over time.

The command dispatched the reinforced 1st Battle Group, 18th Infantry Regiment, to Berlin to strengthen the existing garrison (2nd and 3rd Battle Groups, 6th Infantry). The nuclear armed USAREUR did not go to DEFCON 3 during 22 Oct to 20 November 1962 Cuban Missile Crisis due to political reasons. Almost all other US Forces worldwide were at DEFCON 3 per JFK's 22 October speech and direction to the Pentagon.

The crisis cooled in Berlin from 1962 to 1963, and augmenting forces returned to the United States. Equipment modernization programs during this period included the M113 armored personnel carrier, the M14 rifle, the M60 machine gun, the OV-1 fixed wing observation aircraft, the UH-1B Huey helicopter, the M151 MUTT truck, and the M60 Patton tank. In late 1963 Operation BIG LIFT tested the use of prepositioned equipment through redeployment of the 2nd Armored Division to Europe via a single airlift.

In 1966, France withdrew from the NATO Military Command Structure, and U.S. forces were withdrawn from France. The communications zone headquarters moved from Orleans, France, to Worms, Germany, (and later to Kaiserslautern, where as 21st Theater Support Command it remains today). USEUCOM moved to Stuttgart.

On 1 December 1966, the separate Seventh Army headquarters was eliminated, and HQ USAREUR became Headquarters and Headquarters Company, U.S. Army Europe and Seventh Army.

In January 1967, in accordance with Headquarters Department of the Army Msg NR DA796059 dated 9 January 1967, the USAREUR and Seventh Army staffs were combined to become U.S. Army Europe/Seventh Army. Nearly forty years later, Army Campaign Plan DP 58 (circa 2006) effectively dropped the Seventh Army title. Decisions that took effect in 2006 stated that the official designation would be "United States Army Europe" (USAREUR). The organization perpetuates the lineage and honors of the Seventh Army and authorized the display and wear of appropriate Seventh Army heraldic items.

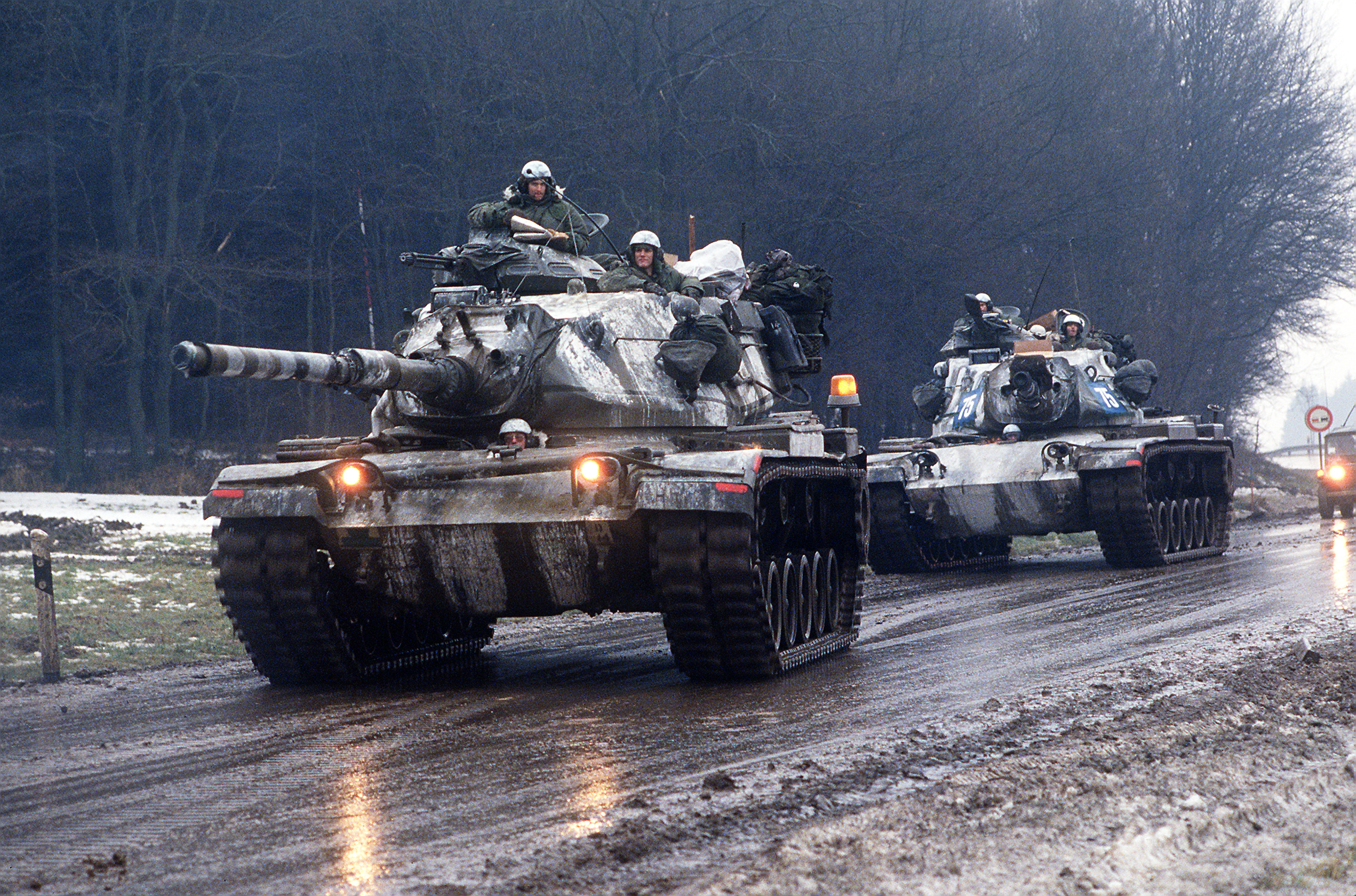
A M-60A3 near Giessen in West Germany, 1985

The first Redeployment of Forces from Germany took place in 1968, with the removal of about 28,000 military personnel from Germany. The units and personnel withdrawn remained committed to NATO and during REFORGER I – Return of Forces to Germany – conducted in January 1969, more than 12,000 soldiers returned to Germany for an exercise using pre-positioned equipment.

In the late 1960s and early 1970s, the needs of the war in Vietnam reduced USAREUR's assigned strength, sometimes drastically. As the war began to wane, forces began to return to Europe, and USAREUR adopted a new system based upon the community commander concept. In 1974, efforts to streamline the headquarters resulted in the termination of the U.S. Theater Army Support Command, and its replacement by a smaller organization, the 21st Theater Army Area Command, now known as 21st Theater Sustainment Command (TSC).

In the 1970s, USAREUR continued to improve its firepower when it received the new M16A1 rifle, the TOW anti-tank weapon, the OH-58 Kiowa observation helicopter, and the AH-1G Cobra helicopter.

During the 1970s, force protection concerns grew as Palestinian groups brazenly conducted terror operations in Europe, such as the kidnapping of Israeli athletes during the 1972 Munich Olympics, and the Red Army Faction and the Red Brigades targeted U.S. facilities and personnel with bombings, kidnapping and assassinations. In May 1972 bombs exploded at V Corps headquarters in Frankfurt, killing an Army lieutenant colonel, and in Heidelberg at Campbell Barracks, killing three Soldiers. U.S. installations were attacked sporadically throughout the remainder of the decade, including a failed 1977 attack on a U.S. Army post in Giessen.

On 15 September 1981, an assassination attempt was made on USAREUR commander Gen. Frederick J. Kroesen and his wife as they were driving through Heidelberg—the automobile trunk lid deflected the RPG-7 anti-tank projectile. In 1985 Army Specialist Edward Pimental was lured out of a Wiesbaden nightclub and killed for his ID card which was then used to enter Rhein-Main Air Base the next day to plant a bomb that killed two. And in 1986 a bombing at a Berlin disco frequented by service members killed two Soldiers.

With increased combat and support components in place, the command undertook a wide-ranging modernization in the decade of the 1980s. More than 400 new systems were introduced, including individual weapons, field rations, the M1A1 Abrams tank, the M2 and M3 Bradley series of infantry and cavalry fighting vehicles, the Multiple Launch Rocket System (MLRS), the MIM-104 Patriot air defense system, the UH-60 Black Hawk and the AH-64A Apache helicopters.

In January 1967, in accordance with Headquarters Department of the Army Msg NR DA796059 dated 9 January 1967, the USAREUR and Seventh Army staffs were merged to become Headquarters and Headquarters Company, United States Army Europe and Seventh Army (HHC USAREUR 7A).

=== Changes of the 1990s ===
The dramatic events of the late 1980s – the opening of the Berlin Wall, German reunification, and the collapse of the Soviet Union – combined to change USAREUR again. Intermediate nuclear weapons of the 56th Field Artillery Command were withdrawn, chemical weapons were moved out of Europe, and units began to depart the European continent while others were inactivated.

When Iraq invaded Kuwait in August 1990, USAREUR began deploying units to the region. The first deployments from USAREUR to Saudi Arabia in August 1990 included the 45th Medical Company, an element of the 421st Medical Battalion (AA), and advance elements of 12th Aviation Brigade, which by September had deployed two Apache attack helicopter battalions, an OH-58 Kiowa scout helicopter company, a Black Hawk utility helicopter company, a CH-47 Chinook platoon, and associated support and maintenance units. These were quickly followed by intelligence specialists, chemical warfare experts, logistical personnel, many individual replacements, and finally almost the entire VII Corps.

The command eventually deployed more than 75,000 personnel plus 1,200 tanks, 1,700 armored combat vehicles, more than 650 pieces of artillery, and more than 325 aircraft. When the war ended, many USAREUR soldiers remained to complete the logistical cleanup; others were deployed to northern Iraq or Turkey as part of Operation Provide Comfort to aid refugees. Upon their return to Europe, many also found that their units were in the process of either relocating to the Continental United States (CONUS) or inactivating.

In 1992 alone, about 70,000 soldiers redeployed to CONUS with about 90,000 family members. The command shrank from 213,000 soldiers in 1990 to 122,000 in 1992. The VII Corps was inactivated. From 858 installations in 1990, USAREUR went down to only 415 in 1993 with more scheduled to close in the years ahead.

After the Gulf War and the subsequent drawdowns, USAREUR faced a wholly different challenge in Europe. The command was engaged in humanitarian support operations, to include disaster relief and rescue and recovery, peacekeeping and non-combatant evacuations. Between 1990 and 1993 the command supported 42 deployments, which involved a total of 95,579 personnel.

Conflict in the Balkans quickly became one of the United States Department of Defense's primary areas of focus, and peace enforcement in Bosnia was a harbinger of future military operations. From 1990 to 1995 USAREUR conducted mostly humanitarian operations in the area. In October 1992, USAREUR sent the 212th Mobile Army Surgical Hospital (MASH) and personnel from the 7th Medical Command to Zagreb, Croatia to provide medical support for United Nations Protection Force (UNPROFOR) casualties. Throughout 1993–1995, USAREUR's 5th Quartermaster Company, in conjunction with United States Air Forces in Europe (USAFE), delivered humanitarian aid to the region.

In June 1993, the command formed Task Force Able Sentry in the Former Yugoslav Republic of Macedonia with the headquarters at Camp Able Sentry near the capital Skopje. These forces, along with personnel from 26 other countries, were originally part of the UNPROFOR which in 1995 became the United Nations Preventative Deployment Force deterring the spread of armed conflict. Upon expiration of the initial UN mandate in February 1999, USAREUR renamed the U.S. Army organization Task Force Sabre, with the task to protect U.S. facilities and equipment. They were relieved in June 1999 by the U. S. national support element to Kosovo Force (KFOR)-Task Force Falcon (Rear). U.S. Soldiers left Camp Able Sentry in 2002, but it remained as a contractor operated logistics base until Aug. 2004 when all U.S. personnel departed and NATO assumed control of the camp.

In Bosnia and Herzegovina, after the Dayton Peace Accords were reached in November 1995, USAREUR's 1st Armored Division began deploying there in December, with the first Lockheed C-130 Hercules landing in Tuzla in Bosnia, on 2 December, and the first trains departing Germany 8 December. One major barrier to the deployment of the 1st Armored Division was the bridge over the Sava River, which was destroyed during the four-year civil war. Construction of the longest assault float bridge in military history, 620 meters long, ribbon float (pontoon) bridge between Croatia and Bosnia and Herzegovina began on 22 December.

Despite melting snow that flooded the river and later, freezing temperatures, the bridge was completed on 31 December and the first M1A1 Abrams tank crossed the bridge at 10 am. The division, along with many Reserve Component support troops, formed Task Force Eagle as part of the NATO-led Implementation Force, under the overall command of British General Michael Walker. Task Force Eagle's mission was to implement and monitor the military aspects of the agreement, enforce the cease-fire, supervise the marking of boundaries and the zone of separation between the former warring factions, and enforce the withdrawal of the combatants to their barracks and the movement of heavy weapons to storage sites.

It was the first time a NATO sponsored force had deployed operationally outside the NATO boundaries. IFOR was succeeded in December 1996 by a smaller, NATO-led Stabilisation Force (SFOR) (Operation Joint Guard) whose mission was to deter renewed hostilities. On 20 June 1998 the mission was renamed Operation Joint Forge, with USAREUR continuing to serve as the supervising Army Service Component Command. On 24 November 2004, Task Force Eagle officially disestablished and closed its base in Tuzla, with European Union forces assuming responsibility for the Bosnia mission.

In early 1999, in response to growing ethnic tensions in Kosovo and military and paramilitary forces in daily conflict resulting in the more than 1,500 Kosovar Albanian deaths and 400,000 refugees, USAREUR formed Task Force Falcon, with the 1st Infantry Division as the core element. On 9 June 1999, after an inconclusive air campaign, Task Force Falcon deployed forces in the largest combined air-rail-sea-road movement since Operation Desert Storm, entering Kosovo on 12 June 1999, as part of Operation Joint Guardian, a NATO-led force with a UN mandate to separate warring factions, oversee the withdrawal of Serb forces and interdict the flow of arms to insurgents.

On 17 February 2008, the Kosovo Assembly declared Kosovo independent. Currently, the U.S. Army, with approx. 800 Soldiers, has the lead for Multinational Battle Group East (MNBG-E) in the eastern region, headquartered near Uroševac at Camp Bondsteel as part of KFOR. Contributing nations include Greece, Lithuania, Poland, Romania, and Ukraine. The majority of U.S. Soldiers come from U.S. Army National Guard units, with a different state taking over the lead for each rotation of approximately nine months.

=== Twenty-first century ===
The 11 September 2001 attacks did not directly affect the Seventh Army. However, the campaign in Iraq in 2003 did. The headquarters of V Corps was deployed to Iraq, as did 173rd Airborne Brigade, and after the campaign, 1st Armored Division followed for occupation duties. With parts of 1st Infantry Division also deployed in Iraq, and others on peacekeeping duties in the Balkans, Seventh Army was virtually stripped of combat formations. The return of 173rd Brigade, V Corps and 1st Armored Division in early 2004 was followed by the deployment of the rest of 1st Infantry Division for occupation duties. V Corps began a rotational deployment in 2009 in support of Operation Iraqi Freedom.

The U.S. Army's reorganization plans from 2005 called for the formation's major subordinate units – 1st Armored Division and 1st Infantry Division – to be relocated to the continental United States – Fort Bliss, Texas, and Fort Riley, Kansas, respectively. The 2nd Stryker Cavalry Regiment, converted to a Stryker Brigade, and the 12th Aviation Brigade, replaced them. The Seventh Army, having been merged with US Army Europe since 1967, remained merged, as was confirmed with the release of unit designations for the modular force in mid 1996.

HQ USAREUR and V Corps were planned to merge and the process started until the decision was made to retain a Corps Headquarters within USAREUR, and V Corps was once again separated from HQ USAREUR. It was then decided that V Corps would deactivate after a final deployment to Afghanistan.

In September 2005, it was expected that the finalised force in Europe would consist of USAREUR HQ, V Corps, aviation and combat service support, and two maneuver brigades: the 2nd Cavalry Regiment in Vilseck, Germany, the 173rd Airborne Brigade, which will eventually expand to three airborne battalions, in Italy. Joint Task Force East provided from forces rotating from continental United States though bases in Bulgaria and Romania, was initially intended to be provided by a rotating US-based brigade.

Two bases at Constanța, Romania were developed, with the main facility located at the Mihail Kogălniceanu Air Base. Initially however, Joint Task Force East was to have been provided by a rotational 2nd Cavalry Regiment Stryker squadron. The Task Force was originally planned to be called the Eastern Europe Task Force. However, since the stresses of the Iraq and Afghan deployments, the army provision of Joint Task Force East has been replaced by a Marine force known as the Black Sea Rotational Force.

Army Campaign Plan DP 58 (circa 2006) effectively dropped the Seventh Army title from U.S. Army Europe. Decisions that took effect in 2006 stated that the official designation would be Headquarters and Headquarters Battalion, United States Army Europe. The organization perpetuates the lineage and honors of the Seventh Army and authorized the display and wear of appropriate Seventh Army heraldic items.

From 2008 to 2012–13, the two to three brigades listed above were augmented by the 170th Infantry Brigade and the 172nd Infantry Brigade, 'reflagged' former V Corps/1st Armored Division formations. Thus from 2008 to 2013, the force was expected to consist of two heavy brigades combat teams, the 2nd Stryker Cavalry Regiment, and the 173rd Airborne Brigade Combat Team.

On 3 December 2008 in Rome, Italy, an official announcement by the U.S. and Italian governments stated that the Southern Europe Task Force would become U.S. Army Africa (USARAF), and one week later on 9 December 2008 USARAF was established as the Army Service Component Command of AFRICOM. According to the Army Times, this marked the end of the airborne chapter of SETAF's history and the beginning of its new role as the Army component of AFRICOM.

On 25 October 2009, in a ceremony at the Parade Field on Daenner Kaserne, the 7th US Army Reserve Command, United States Army Reserve, was inactivated and redesignated the 7th Civil Support Command (CSC). In September 2015 the 7th CSC became the 7th Mission Support Command.

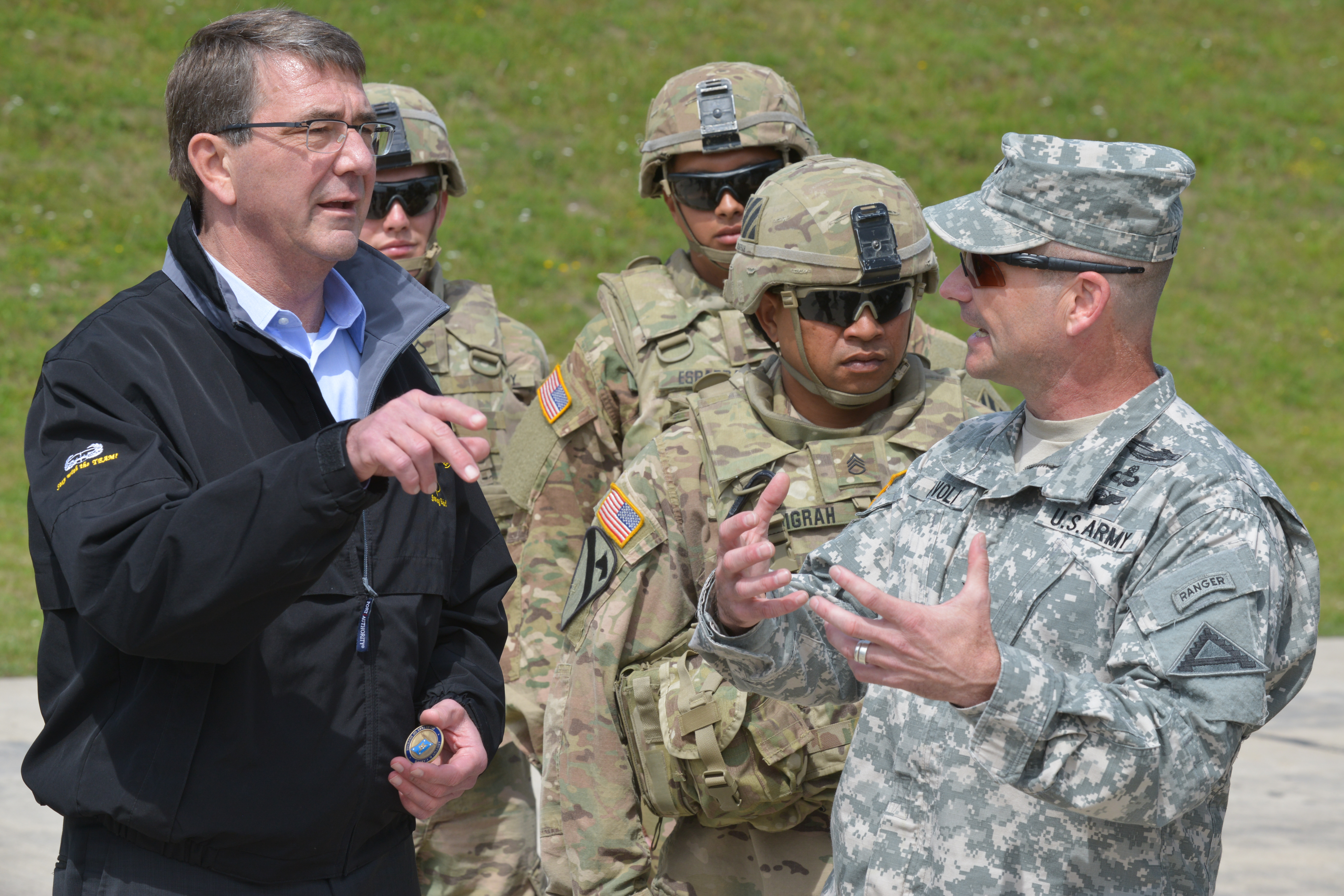
Secretary of Defense Ashton Carter and Christopher G. Cavoli in the Grafenwoehr Training Area, Germany on June 26, 2015

On 26 January 2012, Chief of Staff of the United States Army General Raymond Odierno announced that two Army heavy infantry brigades would be withdrawn from Europe and inactivated. As the 170th Brigade was one of only two such heavy infantry brigades in Europe at the time, it was believed that it was one of the units slated to be inactivated in the wake of large cuts in the U.S. defense budget The 170th Infantry Brigade at Baumholder was deactivated on 9 October 2012.

In 2013, further reductions of U.S. forces in Europe were announced, that would reduce U.S. Army Europe to 30,000 soldiers in two brigade combat teams. These reductions include unit deactivations and facilities closures at Warner Barracks, Bamberg and Schweinfurt. Military police units were reduced: 202nd MP Group and the 1002nd MP Battalion were disbanded on 24 June 2013. In February 2013, it was announced that V Corps would be inactivated in June 2013.

In a ceremony on 12 June 2013, V Corps was awarded the Army Superior Unit Award and Meritorious Unit Citation and formally inactivated. In April 2013, the last of U.S. Army's main battle tanks left Europe due to the departure of the U.S. Army's last two Germany-based heavy brigades: the 170th out of Baumholder and the 172nd at Grafenwöhr.

== V Corps reactivated and the Russian invasion of Ukraine ==
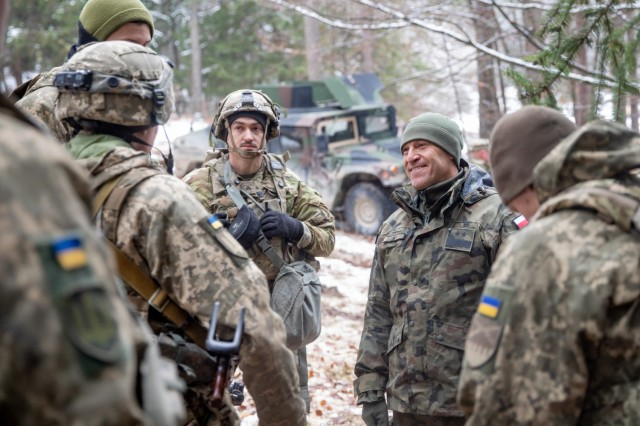
DCG for Interoperability Adam Joks (Poland) visits soldiers of the US and Ukraine, 10 Dec 2021

On 11 February 2020, the United States Department of the Army announced the reactivation of V Corps Headquarters. The HQ was to have approximately 635 soldiers, with approximately 200 who would support an operational command post in Europe. Army Chief of Staff James C. McConville announced that V Corps forward headquarters would be established in Poland after 1 October 2020. 200 of the expected 630 headquarters staff members would be stationed in Poznań on a rotational basis.

On 7 March 2022 the V Corps main headquarters element deployed to Germany, joining the forward element already in Europe, to "provide additional command and control of U.S. Army forces in Europe." The headquarters is also tasked to "provide a more robust presence in Europe and enable the Corps to synchronize current contingency operations, support the ongoing mission to reinforce NATO’s eastern flank and coordinate multinational exercises across the continent." This deployment is in response to the Russian invasion of Ukraine.

In 2026, the United States announced plans to withdraw about 5,000 troops from Germany over six to twelve months as part of a review of its military presence in Europe. The Pentagon said the decision followed a review of U.S. force posture in Europe and conditions on the ground. The announcement came after remarks by German Chancellor Friedrich Merz criticizing U.S. strategy in the war with Iran, and drew comments from President Donald Trump and other U.S. officials. The decision drew concern from several U.S. lawmakers and European officials about the future of American security commitments in the region. Trump also raised the possibility of moving some U.S. forces in Germany to Poland.

== Organization ==
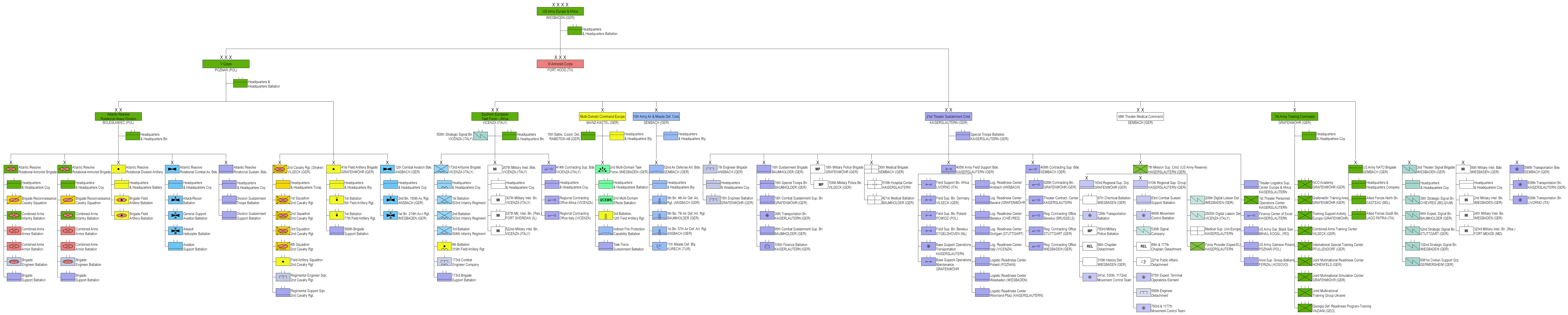
US Army Europe and Africa, and supporting brigades organization January 2026 (click to enlarge)

=== Major subordinate commands ===
As of January 2026 the following units are assigned to United States Army Europe and Africa:

- United States Army Europe and Africa, in Wiesbaden (Germany)
  - Headquarters and Headquarters Battalion, US Army Europe and Africa, in Wiesbaden (Germany)
  - V Corps, in Poznań (Poland)
  - Southern European Task Force – Africa, in Vicenza (Italy)
  - Multi-Domain Command Europe (MDC-E), in Mainz-Kastel (Germany)
  - 10th Army Air and Missile Defense Command, in Sembach (Germany)
  - 7th Army Training Command, in Grafenwöhr (Germany)
  - 21st Theater Sustainment Command, in Kaiserslautern (Germany)
  - 68th Theater Medical Command, in Sembach (Germany)
  - US Army NATO Brigade, in Sembach (Germany)
  - US Army Europe and Africa Band and Chorus, in Sembach (Germany)
  - US Army Flight Operations Detachment, in Wiesbaden

=== Supporting organizations ===
The following units of other US Army commands provide support to United States Army Europe and Africa:

- US Army Network Enterprise Technology Command
  - 2nd Theater Signal Brigade, in Wiesbaden
- US Army Intelligence and Security Command
  - 66th Military Intelligence Brigade, in Wiesbaden
- US Army Transportation Command
  - 598th Transportation Brigade, in Sembach
    - 838th Transportation Battalion, in Kaiserslautern
    - 839th Transportation Battalion, in Livorno (Italy)
- US Army Installation Management Command
  - Installation Management Command – Europe, in Sembach
    - US Army Garrison Ansbach, in Ansbach
    - US Army Garrison Bavaria, in Grafenwöhr
    - US Army Garrison Benelux, in Chièvres
    - US Army Garrison Black Sea, in Mihail Kogălniceanu
    - US Army Garrison Italy, in Vicenza
    - US Army Garrison Poland, in Poznań
    - US Army Garrison Rheinland-Pfalz, in Kaiserslautern
    - US Army Garrison Stuttgart, in Böblingen
    - US Army Garrison Wiesbaden, in Wiesbaden
- US Army Medical Command
  - Medical Readiness Command – Europe, in Sembach
    - Landstuhl Regional Medical Center
    - SHAPE Healthcare Facility
    - US Army Health Clinic Ansbach
    - US Army Health Clinic Baumholder
    - US Army Health Clinic Brussels
    - US Army Health Clinic Grafenwöhr
    - US Army Health Clinic Hohenfels
    - US Army Health Clinic Kaiserslautern
    - US Army Health Clinic Stuttgart
    - US Army Health Clinic Vicenza
    - US Army Health Clinic Vilseck
    - US Army Health Clinic Wiesbaden
- US Army Medical Logistics Command
  - US Army Medical Materiel Center – Europe, in Kaiserslautern
- US Army Corps of Engineers
  - US Army Corps of Engineers - Europe District, in Wiesbaden
- United States Army Criminal Investigation Division
  - Criminal Investigation Division - Europe Field Office
    - 5th Military Police Battalion (CID), in Kaiserslautern

== Commanding generals ==
- Commanding General, United States Army Europe.

== Notable personnel ==
- Paul D. Phillips, worked in the civil affairs division (1952–1954); former oldest living West Point graduate, retired as a Brigadier General.

== See also ==
- List of NATO exercises
