= Vilseck =

- Town
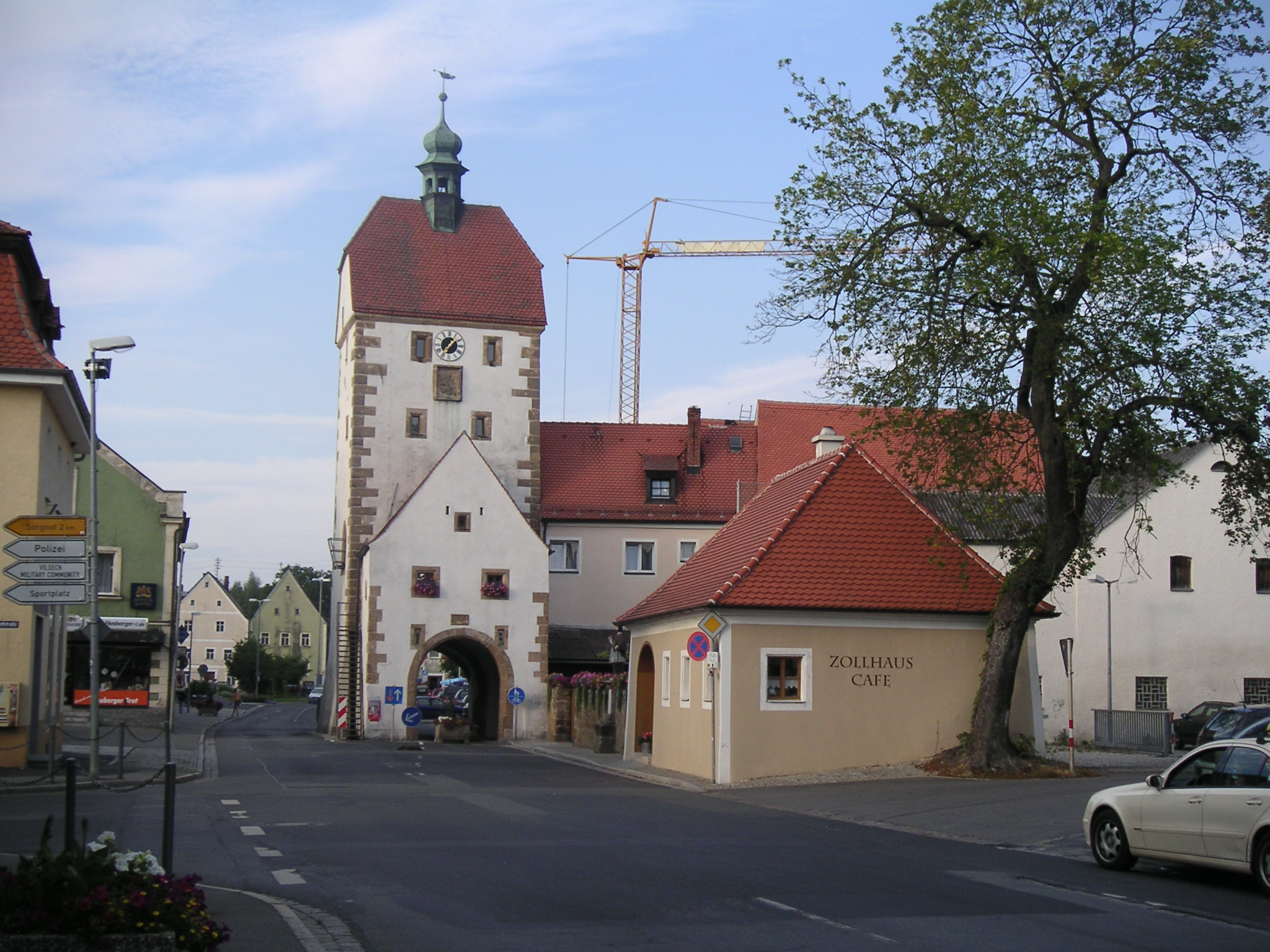
- Center of the town

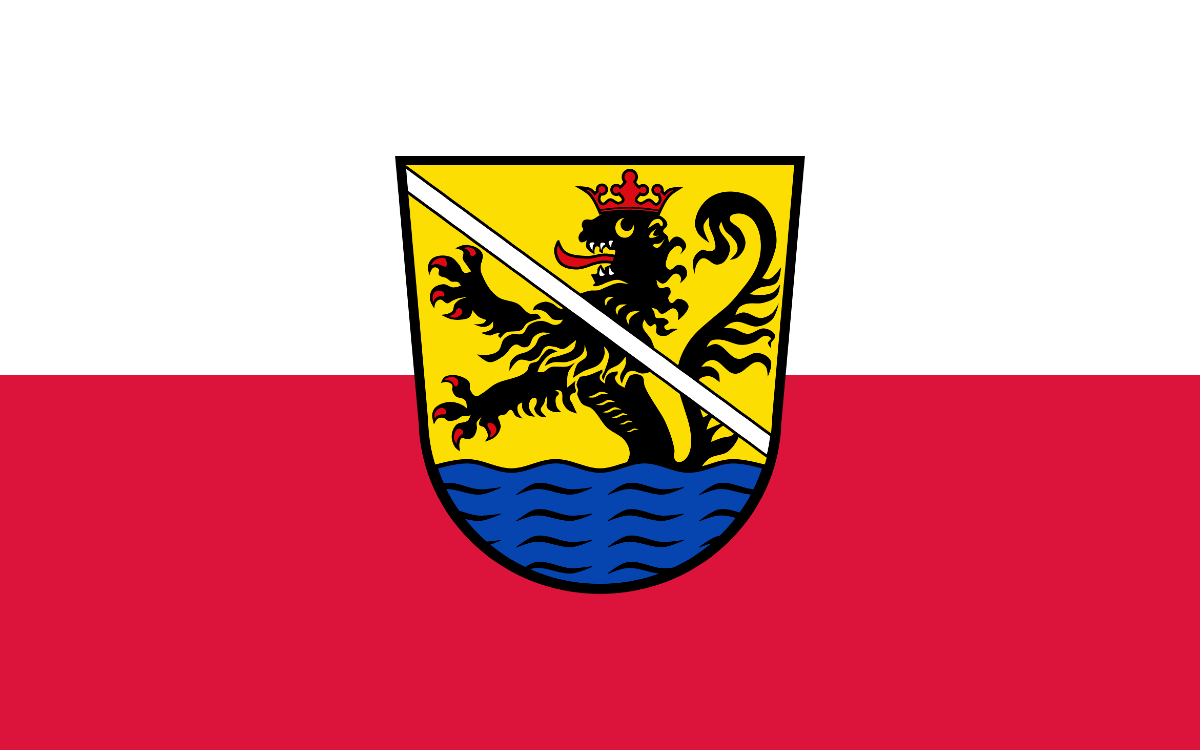
- Flag Coat of arms

- Location of Vilseck within Amberg-Sulzbach district
- Interactive map of Vilseck
- Location within Germany Location within Bavaria
- Coordinates: 49°36′N 11°48′E
- Country: Germany
- State: Bavaria
- Admin. region: Oberpfalz
- District: Amberg-Sulzbach
- Subdivisions: 35 Ortsteile

Government
  - Mayor (2020–26): Hans-Martin Schertl

Area
  - Total: 64.7 km^{2} (25.0 sq mi)
- Elevation: 395–450 m (1,296–1,476 ft)

Population (2025-12-31)
  - Total: 6,558
  - Density: 101/km^{2} (263/sq mi)
- Time zone: UTC+01:00 (CET)
  - Summer (DST): UTC+02:00 (CEST)
- Postal codes: 92249
- Dialling codes: 09662
- Vehicle registration: AS
- Website: www.vilseck.de

Vilseck (German pronunciation: [ˈfɪlzɛk]) is a town and municipality (German: Gemeinde) in the Oberpfalz region of northeastern Bavaria, Germany, situated on the river Vils, a tributary of the Naab river. As of December 31, 2022, Vilseck's population was 6,768 citizens, who live within an area of 64.71 km^{2} (24.98 sq mi) consisting of Vilseck town proper and 35 other hamlets and villages. The town is 402 meters (1,300 feet) above sea level.

The town's name comes from Vilseck castle built in 920. Eck is the German word for corner. The Vils river has a tight bend where the castle (German: Burg) is located: thus the name Vilseck.

The town is geographically separate from a nearby large American military base known as the Rose Barracks, but more commonly referred to as Vilseck. The base, built in 1937–1938, was captured during World War II from the Germans, whose name for it was Südlager.

== Geography ==
The municipality's neighbouring municipalities are Edelsfeld, Königstein, Freihung and Hahnbach.

Apart from the town of Vilseck proper, the municipality consists of the following villages:

- Altmannsberg
- Axtheid
- Axtheid-Berg
- Bruckmühle
- Bürgerwald
- Drechselberg
- Ebersbach
- Frauenbrunn
- Gressenwöhr
- Gumpenhof
- Heringnohe
- Heroldsmühle
- Hohenzant
- Kagerhof
- Ködritz
- Langenbruck
- Leinschlag
- Lohhof
- Neuhammer
- Oberweißenbach
- Oedgodlricht
- Rauschenhof
- Reisach
- Schlicht
- Schöfelhof
- Schönlind
- Schüsselhof
- Seiboldsricht
- Sigl
- Sollnes
- Sorghof
- Triebweg
- Unterweißenbach
- Weiherhäusl
- Wickenricht

== History ==
=== 920 ===
Construction of the castle at around 925. Primawatchtower with piling and moat, stone watchtower built in the 12th century. At this time a "Burg" (castle) on an elevated place was often called an Eck; thus the name Vilseck derived from: City next to the Vilsburg. (Vilseck). It is also possible that the name comes from the fact that the city is situated on the Vils on a west-to-east stretch between two distinct 90-degree bends in the river. The German word for corner is also "Eck".

=== 1104 ===
Destruction of the castle by Emperor Heinrich IV during a devastating campaign against Berengar from Sulzbach.

=== 1185 ===
First documentation of the town "Vilseck"

=== 1188-1268 ===
Affiliation of Vilseck and surrounding areas to the administrative district of the Episcopal-Bamberg bailiwick (Vogtei) under the protection of the Stauffer Emperor.

=== 1190 ===
Earliest documentation of the second castle. In the following years construction of a new castle with the growing of the new city of Vilseck. City and Castle accrete.

=== 1269-1802 ===
Town area belongs to the administrative office of the Bishop of Bamberg.

=== 1289 ===
First documentation of "City" (ciuitatis) of Vilseck.

=== 1332-1380 ===
Construction of the city fortification: 940 m (half a mile) curtain wall, (9 m (30 feet) high, 1.60 m (5 feet) thick), 17 towers and three gates surrounded by a moat.

=== 1380 ===
Awarding of the city crest by Lampert von Brunn, Bishop of Bamberg. Construction of the town hall (Rathaus).

Construction of choir aisle and nave on Romanic foundation, remaining from 11th century, at the church in Schlicht.

=== 1407-1412 ===
Construction of parish church on from 11th century remaining Romanic foundation.

=== 1466 ===
Construction of the Vogelturm "bird-tower" (well-known landmark and symbol of Vilseck).

=== 1512 ===
Castle is attacked, plundered and burned down by the knights Hans Pflug and Hand Selbitz, comrades-in-arms of Götz von Berlichingens. Afterwards - reconstruction.

=== 1522 ===
Majority of the city, including the town hall, burns down. Plundering of the city through Margrave (Markgraf) Albrecht IV from Hohenzollern-Brandenburg.

=== 1620 ===
Pillaged during Thirty Years' War.

=== 1631-1634 ===
The black death carries off most of population.

=== 1638-1639 ===
Pillaged during Thirty Years' War.

=== 1751-1754 ===
Construction of the nave at Catholic church in baroque style.

=== 1802 ===
Since 1802 affiliation to Bavaria.

=== 1803 ===
Integration into the Oberpfalz. (Upper Palatinate District).

=== 1808 ===
Local villages, like Gressenwöhr, Irlbach, Langenbruck, Schlicht and Sigl, become political structured communities.

=== 1838 ===
After authorization through King Ludwig I. the Landgericht (County Court) is set in the Vilseck cityhall.

=== 1852-1919 ===
In this timeframe a "Vilseck District" exists as major regional authority with the communities of Adlholz, Ehenfeld, Gebenbach, Gressenwöhr, Großschönbrunn, Hahnbach, Iber, Irlbach, Kürmreuth, Langenbruck, Massenricht, Schlicht, Seugast, Sigl, Sigras, Süß, Vilseck and Weißenberg .

=== 1864 ===
City hall on fire. Ruin will be transferred to state government to construct new district courthouse.

=== 1901 ===
Opening of a public telephone office.

=== 1908 ===
Construction of the Grafenwöhr Training Area North, with displacement of larger parts of the Vilseck Bürgerwald. (forest).

=== 1929-1930 ===
Construction of water supply system

=== 1937 ===
Enlargement of water supply system to supply German Army Base.

=== 1937-1938 ===
Construction of German Army Base (Südlager) in the Grafenwöhr Training Area. For the extension of the Grafenwöhr Training Area several villages, like: Langenbruck, Altenweiher, Altneuhaus, Bernhof, Betzlhof, Erzhäusl, Fenkenhof, Grünwald, Hellziechen, Kittenberg, Schindlhof, Schmierhütte and Wirlhof had to be evacuated.

The base capitulated to the U.S. Army in 1945.

=== Postwar history ===
In 1946, the town integrated the villages of Schönlind, Ödgodlricht, Heroldsmühle and Gumpenhof from the broken-down community of Irlbach, forming the community of Schlicht.

In 1951, there was the construction of the new railway station.

In 1955, the city's water supply system was connected to Schlicht.

During the following years (1956–1959), the Protestant church was built.

1957 was the start of construction of the city sewage system.

1962-1964 saw the construction of the new school with gymnasium in Vilseck.

From 1981 to 1993, the US Army extended and enlarged the Rose Barracks for about DM1,000 million.

In 2000 the "Erstes Deutsches Türmermuseum" (1st German museum of tower watchman or tower keeper) had its grand opening.

== Vilseck and the U.S. Army ==
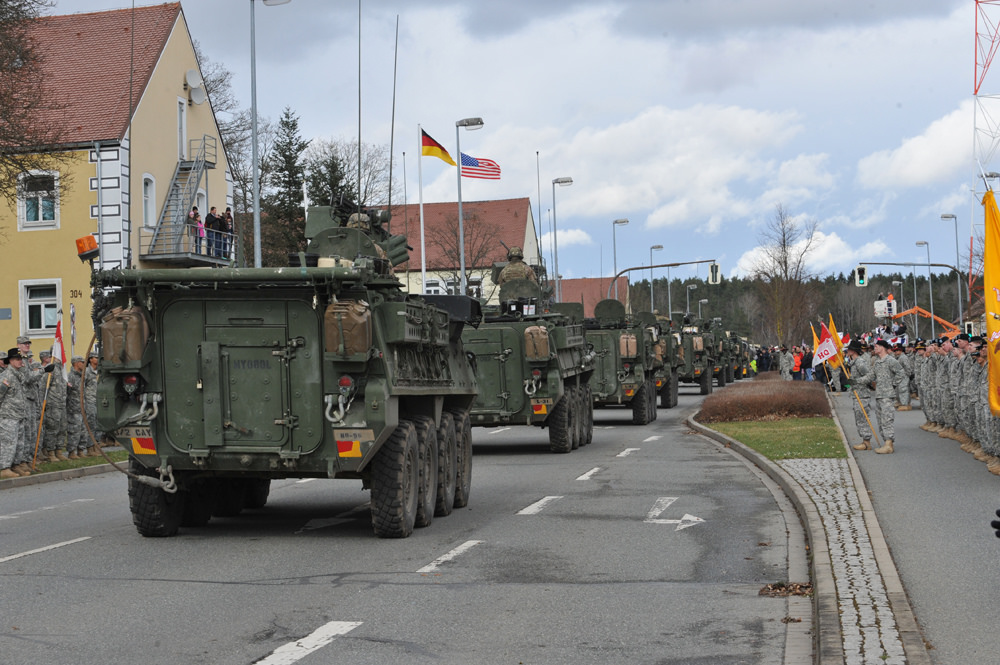
US Army Stryker armored vehicles return to Rose Barracks after Operation Dragoon Ride in 2015

Vilseck is home to Rose Barracks, a U.S. Army post (of the 2nd Cavalry Regiment) located just outside the town.

== Trivia ==
The town is home to Germany's first tower museum.

== Notable people ==
- Matthias Kohl (born August 14, 1973, in Vilseck), mathematician and statistician
