= Grafenwoehr Training Area =

United States Army training area in Bavaria, Germany

Grafenwoehr Training Area U.S. Army Garrison Grafenwoehr
- Truppenübungsplatz Grafenwöhr
- Grafenwöhr, Bavaria in Germany
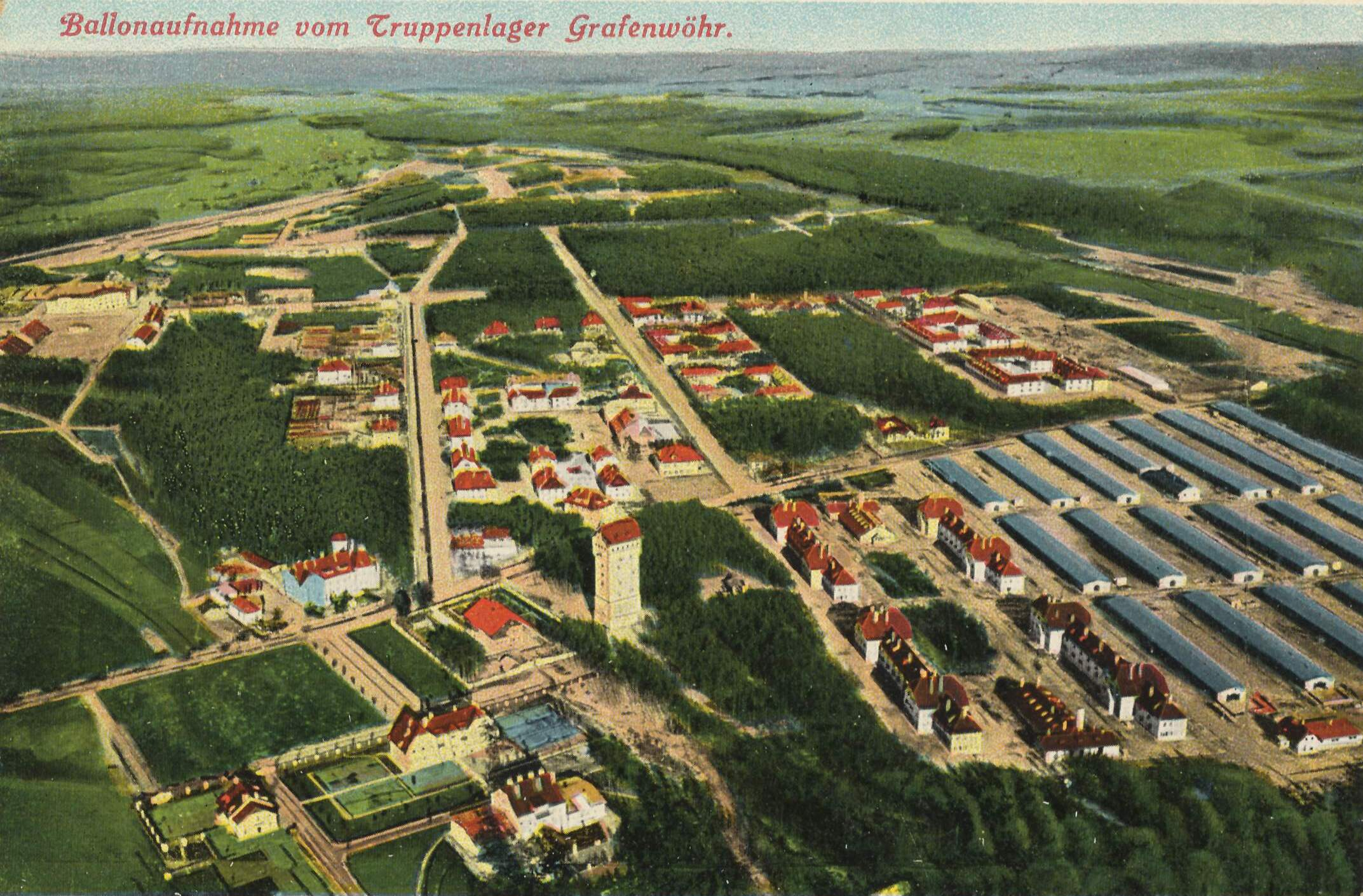
- Grafenwöhr postcard, 1910

Site information
- Type: Military training area (ground-based warfare)
- Owner: Germany, Bundeswehr
- Operator: United States Armed Forces, United States Army
- Controlled by: 7th Army Joint Multinational Training Command
- Condition: Operational
- Website: https://home.army.mil/bavaria/

Location
- Coordinates: 49°41′N 11°48′E
- Area: 232 square kilometres (90 sq mi)

Site history
- Built: 1907; 119 years ago
- In use: 30 June 1910 – present

Garrison information
- Garrison: U.S. Army Garrison Bavaria
- Occupants: 1st Brigade Combat Team, 1st Cavalry Division - Ironhorse Brigade, 41st Field Artillery Brigade

Grafenwoehr Training Area (GTA) (German: Truppenübungsplatz Grafenwöhr), also known as the U.S. Army Garrison Grafenwoehr (abbreviated USAG Grafenwoehr), is a United States Army military training base located near Grafenwöhr, eastern Bavaria, Germany. At 232 square kilometres (90 square miles), it is the largest training facility of the United States of America in Europe. The base is operated by 7th Army Joint Multinational Training Command, and includes live firing training areas. Grafenwoehr facilities include the Tower Barracks. Grafenwoehr Training Area now comes under the command of the U.S. Army Garrison Bavaria.

== History ==
The military training area was established in 1907 by clearing at least 58 smaller villages, and used to train troops for the III Royal Bavarian Corps. Undergoing a major expansion from 96 to 230 square kilometres (37 to 89 square miles) in 1938 and forcibly evicting more than 3,500 people from their villages, the base was used by the Wehrmacht to practice blitzkrieg tactics. During the course of the war, a myriad of different units were trained in the area, including foreign volunteers of the Wehrmacht and Waffen-SS, as well as four divisions of the Italian Social Republic's National Republican Army.

Following World War II, the base was occupied by the United States Army. On 2 September 1960, 16 American soldiers were killed and 26 injured when an 8-inch howitzer shell crashed into them during a morning roll call. The shell had been overloaded with charge, and when fired, went 4 1/2 miles (7 kilometres) beyond its target.

== Assigned units ==
On 30 November 2018, the 41st Field Artillery Brigade was re-activated at Tower Barracks, U.S. Army Garrison Bavaria, controlling the M270 Multiple Launch Rocket System-equipped 1st Battalion, 6th Field Artillery Regiment and 1st Battalion, 77th Field Artillery Regiment. Within the training area, Camp Aachen and Camp Algiers are located on the Grafenwoehr Training Area, and provide housing support, as well as an Morale, Welfare and Recreation (MWR), United Service Organizations (USO), and Army and Air Force Exchange Service (AAFES) shoppette facility. In addition, Grafenwoehr Training Area is home to the Joint Multinational Simulation Centre specifically located on the Camp Aachen portion of the training area.
