= European Deterrence Initiative =

US-European Security Cooperation Program

European Deterrence Initiative (since July 2014)
- (part of Collective Security)
- Seal of the United States Department of Defense
- Project type: Security and intelligence support
- Funding agency: Department of Defense
- Sponsors: NSATU Trust Fund
- Framework programme: US European force forward presence
- Reference: Legislation: (FY2015-2024) Annual DoD Appropriation Acts; (FY2022- 2024) Ukraine Security Supplemental Appropriation Acts
- Location: Europe; USA
- Project coordinator: U.S. Congress
- Participants: USEUCOM; Operation Atlantic Resolve (OAR, till FY2022); SAG Ukraine, since FY2022
- Partners: NSATU; UDCG; International Donor Coordination Centre
- Budget: Total: US$40,622 million apportioned by Congress as of September 30, 2025; Funding: by fiscal years, in millions (USD): (Note: Rounded FY2016-FY2023 actuals; FY2024-FY2025 - as reported by the Department of Defense; FY2024-FY2025 not including USAI.); FY2016 US$800; FY2017 US$3,400; FY2018 US$4,800; FY2019 US$6,500; FY2020 US$6,000; FY2021 US$4,500; FY2022 US$3,812; FY2023 US$4,268; FY2024 US$3,630; FY2025 US$2,911
Duration
2016 fiscal year — present – (10 years)
OAR, Ukrainian mission
- Ukrainian mission of Operation Atlantic Resolve
  - Part of European Deterrence Initiative (ongoing Russo-Ukrainian War)
  - Operational scope: Training coordination; Forward basing; Equipment logistics; Force generation
  - Planned: on and up to 12-month horizon (Note: As of 23 August 2024, OAR designated by SecDef as overseas contingency operation, normally budgeted within yearly planning (done by the US, in collaboration with NATO allies/partners' military leaders). As of Q2FY2025, $33.512 billion were appropriated, $23.29 billion obligated, and $12.469 billion disbursed under USAI (within base budget) since FY2022.)
  - Planned by: Joint Chiefs of Staff w/ DoD OUSD(P) (Note: Office of Undersecretary of Defence (Policy))
  - Commanded by: CDR USEUCOM (adm., with LTG Curtis A. Buzzard); CG USAREUR- AF (oper.)
  - Objective: NATO support to assure Eastern European Partners; Development of capable combined interoperability; Deterrence of Russia
  - Date: APR 2014; NOV 2021; present; (CET UTC+01:00/CEST UTC+02:00)
  - Executed by: (since NOV 2022) COM SAG- U/ NSATU (dual hatted), (Note: As of August 2025; since December 2024.) with UDCG/IDCC deliverables
  - Outcome: Mission ongoing and evolving: 3 SAG-U monthly UA movements (Note: As of April 2025 by SAG-U Operations Kyiv, on average, to the front-line locations, non-locally authorized.); 18,000t/month cargo throughput (Note: Through Poland hub only.); 80,000pers., USAF Europe posture (Note: including Active Guard Reserve elements. As of December 2024, non- NATO units, including rotational deployment of up to two Brigade Combat Teams in Central and Eastern Europe with 9,000+ troops in Poland.); 156,000 UA personnel trained (Note: As of October 2024 by international community since 2022. U.S. accounted for ~ 17% of that training.); V Corps HQ (Forward, FOS Poznań, PL) (Note: As of Nov.2021, the newly reactivated V Corps has assumed command&control of all OAR rotational forces.)
SAG Ukraine
- Security Assistance Group Ukraine (in US spending since Russian invasion)
  - «Група безпекового сприяння Україні», Європейське командування ЗС США (Ukrainian)
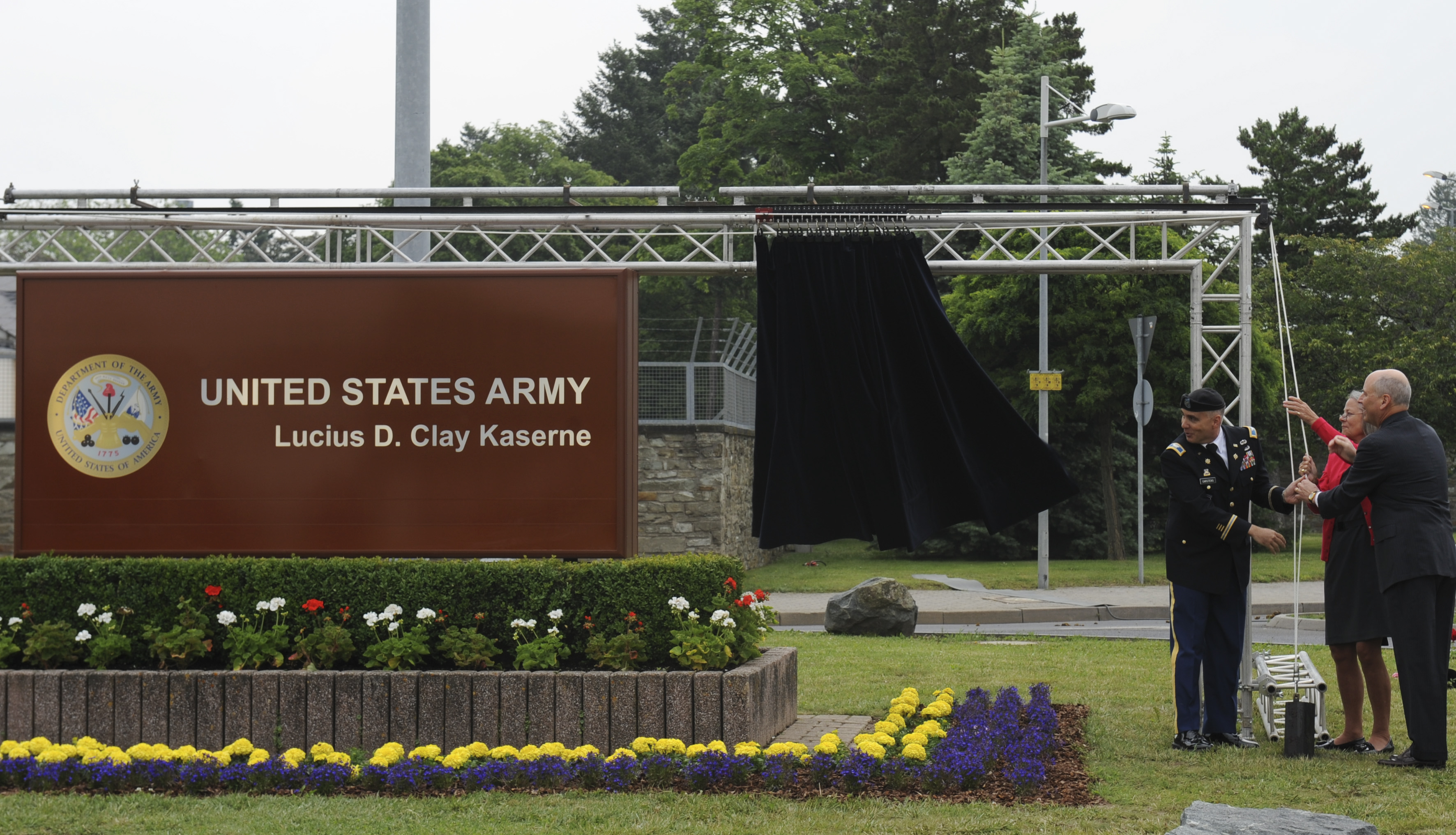
  - Clay Kaserne (garrison patron Gen. Clay, Mil. Governor of U.S. Occupation Zone in Germany, 1947- 49). 2012
  - Founded: APR 2022 (inaugurated) (Note: As Task Force Dragon, at the Base's Tony Bass Auditorium, funded by European Deterrence Initiative.); NOV 4, 2022 (established) (Note: As long-term assistance command.)
  - Allegiance: United States Armed Forces
  - Type: Title 10 combined, joint service operational assistant command
  - Role: Provisioning of military training, education and equipment to AFU
  - Size: 329 personnel as of April 2025 (Note: Including two of its planning directorate placed in NSATU command to coordinate AFU's training requests. SAG- U's multinational personnel is collocated with NSATU HQ and International Donor Coordination Centre (IDCC, of more than 50 countries, under UK Brigadier command). SAG- U US- only personnel includes up to 60 experts at SAG-U Operations Kyiv (SOK) under authority of the Chief of US Mission in Kyiv.)
  - Part of: USEUCOM (administratively, within Operation Atlantic Resolve)
  - Ops. Centre: Clay Kaserne, Wiesbaden- Erbenheim, Wiesbaden, Hesse, Germany
  Commanders
  - Commander 3-star rank: LTG Curtis A. Buzzard (JUL 2024- pres.) (Note: As nominated for OAR. Since December 2024, concurrently COM NSATU.) United States Army
  - DCOM/ACOM-Training, 1- star rank: BRG P.H.G.H. Robichaud (JUN 2025-present, Canadian Army) (Note: Brigadier-General P.H.G.H.Robichaud's full name is Patrick Henri George Hugh Robichaud.)
  - Command Sergeant Major: SGM Mark Morgan (DEC 2024- pres.) (Note: Concurrently NSATU Enlisted Advisor)United States Marine Corps
  - Notable commanders: (first holder) Chris Donahue, General, US Army (then COM XVIII Airborne Corps) (Note: As Task Force Dragon Commander, till December 2022. Promoted in December 2024 to CG USAREUR-AF overseeing, among others, SAG- U.); LTG Antonio Aguto, US Army (DEC 2022-DEC 2024)
  - Footnotes

The European Deterrence Initiative (EDI) is a United States military program initiated in June 2014, about three months after the Annexation of Crimea by the Russian Federation, by the White House to increase U.S. presence in Europe for security purposes. "The EDI continues to enhance the presence and readiness in Europe to deter Russian aggression." Created through National Defense Authorization Act for Fiscal Year 2015, before 2017 it was known as the European Reassurance Initiative.

According to GAO, activities under the initiative have enhanced U.S. military posture in U.S. EUCOM's area of responsibility by supporting the deployment of additional U.S. rotational forces and expanding the number of locations where U.S. forces operate.

== Funding ==
The EDI is funded through the U.S. Department of Defense. Since EDI was first proposed in Fiscal Year (FY) 2014, the initiative has provided funding in support of five lines of effort: (1) Increased Presence, (2) Exercises and Training, (3) Enhanced Prepositioning, (4) Improved Infrastructure, and (5) Building Partnership Capacity. The FY 2022 EDI budget request supports an average force strength of 9,954 active, reserve, and National Guard personnel in U.S. European Command USEUCOM, including 9,452 Army, 459 Air Force, and 43 Navy personnel. The EDI acts as one of the primary funding sources for the USEUCOM and USEUCOM Service Components to continue the posture adjustments made in response to the European security environment.

1. Continue to enhance the capability and readiness of U.S. Forces, NATO Allies, and regional partners of the U.S. for a faster response to any aggression in Europe and transnational threats by a regional adversary against the sovereign territory of NATO nations.
2. Bolster the security and capacity of our NATO Allies and partners, enabling allied investments toward Article 3 responsibilities, and assuring the United States’ commitment to Article 5 and the territorial integrity of all NATO nations.
3. Continue to improve theater Joint Reception, Staging, Onward Movement, and Integration (JRSO&I), ECAOS, and APS capabilities.

The initiative increased in appropriation from a $1 billion operation to $3.4 billion by 2017. In May 2017, U.S. President Donald Trump proposed adding another $1.4 billion (+40%) to the appropriation.

Starting from FY2022, EDI has transitioned from overseas contingency operation budgeting to the baseline budget, including funding of the USAI. The initiative is not a separate budget, but highlights a line of effort since 2014. Enhanced pre-positioning of equipment, munitions, fuel, and materiel is a core focus of EDI. (Note: As part of its global posture, the Department of Defense (DOD) maintains stocks of mission-essential equipment, supplies, and munitions deemed sufficient to attain and sustain strategic objectives in contingency plans. To facilitate rapid deployment of U.S. forces during the initial phases of operations, some of this materiel is pre-positioned at or near points of planned use in specialized facilities (i.e., ashore) and dedicated ships (i.e., afloat).) For fiscal year 2025, DoD requested $713 million for enhanced prepositioning for EDI.

== Operations covered ==
Operation Atlantic Resolve was covered by the initiative till FY2022 (as an overseas contingency operation together with EDI), since having transitioned to direct USAI funding. Nominated in July 2024 for the Operation commander of Security Assistance Group–Ukraine (SAG-U) is dual hatted first-holder commander of NSATU since December 2024. Part of USEUCOM within the Operation, multinational SAG-U operates out of Wiesbaden, Germany. Joint Military Training Group Ukraine, among others, operates under U.S. EUCOM, U.S. Army Europe and Africa, and SAG-U: training is led by the 7ATC and executed by rotating National Guard brigade task forces, with support from units across the U.S. Army.

In September 2019, a diversion of some of the funding was announced to extend the US-Mexico border wall, for fiscal years 2019–2020.

Activation in 2022 of a new corps headquarters, designated V Corps, located at Fort Knox, KY, was complemented by its HQ (Forward) rotational presence in Poznań, Poland, meaning some soldiers from the unit deploy to the country on a rotating basis. As of December 2024, US Europe force posture (non- NATO units) amounted to 80,000 personnel, including rotational deployment of up to two Brigade Combat Teams in Central and Eastern Europe (with more than 9,000 troops in Poland). USEUCOM reported that in the first quarter of 2025, there were no mission objectives and endstate alterations after U.S. administration change.

According to GovWin, "the EDI is one of the investments that have helped set the stage for the U.S.’ ability to support Ukraine from Poland and Hungary... (Information) Technology plays a major role in DOD capabilities under this program."

== See also ==
- European Peace Facility
- Pacific Deterrence Initiative
