= Operation Atlantic Resolve =

US deployments to Europe in response to Russo-Ukrainian War

Current phase: Timeline; Outline; Ukraine mission, since NOV 2021 (Note: Evolved with policy objectives. Mission statement is updated in classified Executive orders.)
- (in the US Ukraine Response); Part of Russian invasion deterrence
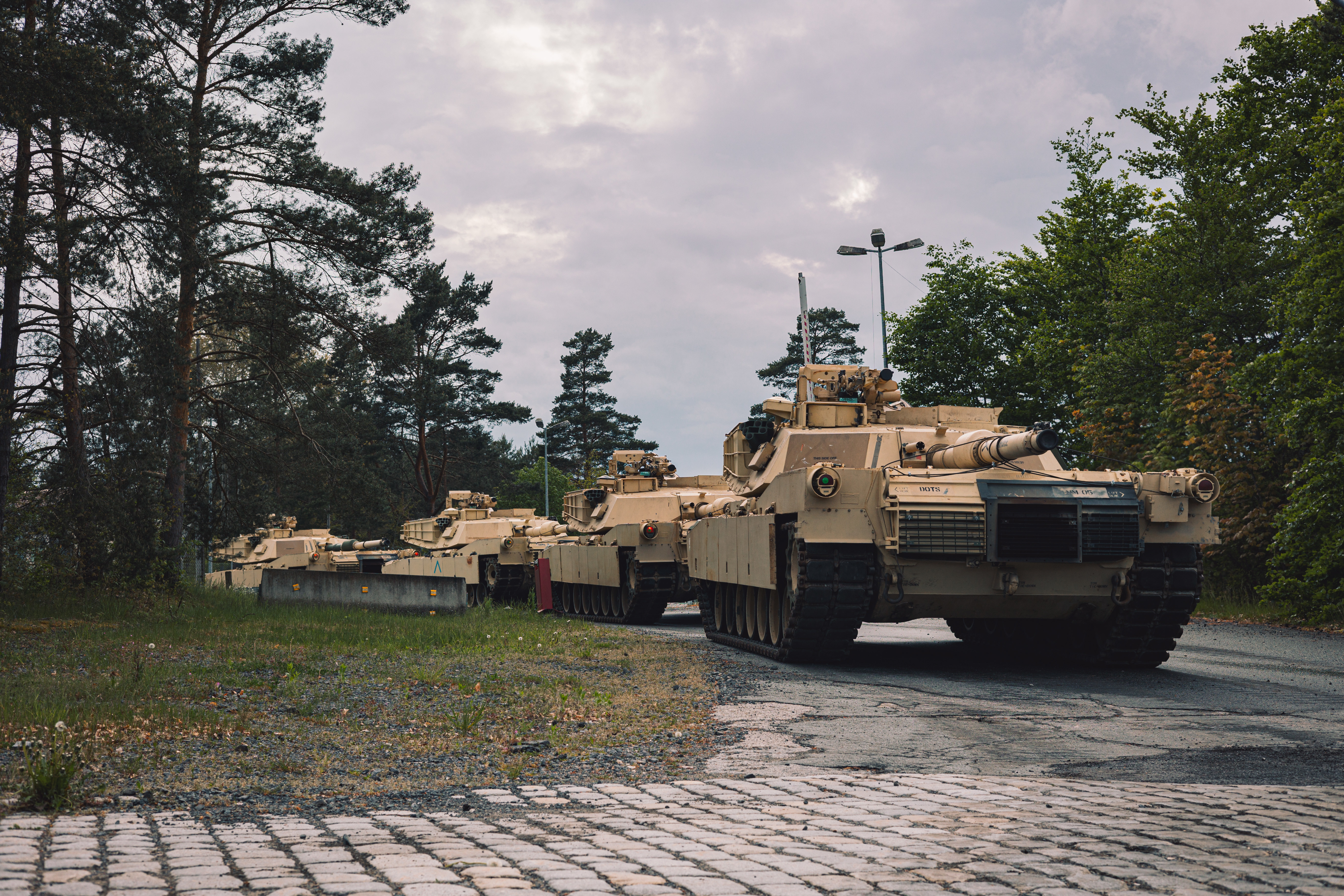
- US M1A1 Abrams tanks needed for training the Armed Forces of Ukraine await transport to training areas at Grafenwoehr, Germany. May 11, 2023. (Note: The M1A1 training is expected to last several weeks and will include live fire, crew qualification, maneuver, and maintainer training. Armed Forces of Ukraine training is conducted by 7th Army Training Command at Grafenwoehr and Hohenfels training areas in Germany on behalf of U.S. Army Europe and Africa.)
- Operational scope: Training coordination; Forward basing; Equipment logistics; Force generation
- Locations: Camp Kościuszko, (HQ); PL 52.4083°N 16.9336°E; Tower Barracks (JMTG — U) (Note: Joint Multinational Training Group-Ukraine. Previously the Combat Training Center-Yavoriv ( International Peacekeeping and Security Centre in Ukraine), active since 2015, it was relocated from Yavoriv, and other training sites in Ukraine in February 2022.); DE 49.7167°N 11.9°E; PL Jasionka Base (Note: Includes Remote Maintenance and Distribution Cell–Ukraine (RDC-U), responsible for the maintenance and repair of equipment once donated to the AFU, smaller locations, such as logistical Support Area Eagle, and the Aerial Port of Debarkation South (APOD South).)
- Planned: on 12 month horizon (Note: As of October 2025, OAR is designated by SecDef as overseas contingency operation (OCO) following the activation of reserve forces in support of OAR. OCO is normally budgeted out of baseline DoD budget, and within yearly planning (done by the US, in collaboration with NATO allies/partners' military leaders). As of March 2025, $33.512 billion were appropriated, $23.29 billion obligated, and $12.469 billion disbursed under USAI since FY2022. USAI is a program that authorizes the Secretary of Defense, with concurrence from the Secretary of State, to provide appropriate security assistance and intelligence support to Ukraine. Such assistance can include training, defense articles, logistics support, supplies, and services to military and other Ukrainian security forces.)
- Planned by: Joint Chiefs of Staff w/ DoD OUSD(P) (Note: Office of Undersecretary of Defence (Policy))
- Commanded by: CDR USEUCOM (ADCOM with LTG Curtis A. Buzzard); CG USAREUR- AF (OPCOM)
- Objective: NATO support to assure Eastern European Partners; Development of capable combined interoperability; Russia deterrence
- Date: APR 2014 • NOV 2021 • present (CET UTC+01:00/CEST UTC+02:00)
- Executed by: (since NOV 2022) COM SAG–U / NSATU (dual hatted), (Note: As of October 2025; since December 2024. See SAG Ukraine infobox) with UDCG deliverables (Note: Before 2025, with deliverables of IDCC, International Donors Coordination Centre, whose responsibilities were taken over by NSATU.)
- Outcome: Mission ongoing and evolving (Note: USEUCOM said that it assesses the status of OAR through regular meetings with NATO allies and partners to discuss progress and challenges; measures of performance and effectiveness to track progress toward desired end states; the conduct and evaluation of combined exercises and training events; the development and implementation of initiatives aimed at enhancing NATO’s capabilities; and by reviewing quantitative changes to the number of U.S. troops in Europe and public support for NATO and U.S. forces in Europe.) Prior to 2022: One ABCT, one SBCT permanent deployment to Germany, Italy Since 2022: 18000t/month cargo throughput (Note: As of August 2025 average cargo tonnage through Poland LEN hub only); 3 UA monthly movements by SOK (Note: As of April 2025, by SAG-U Operations Kyiv, at least, to the front-line locations, non-locally authorized.); 37pers.-SAG-U Operations Kyiv, SOK (Note: As of October 2024 average US- only SAG- U personnel stationed under authority of the Chief of US Mission in Kyiv, Ukraine.); 80,000pers.-USAF Europe posture (Note: As of December 2024, non- NATO units, including rotational deployment of up to 2 BCTs in Central and Eastern Europe with 9,000+ steady troops in Poland.); 192,000personell of AFU jointly trained (Note: As of July 2025 by international community since February 2022. As reported in October 2024, US accounted for ~ 17% of that training.); JMTG-U formed in Grafenwoehr, DE; V Corps HQ Forward, Poznań, PL (Note: Starting NOV 2021, the newly reactivated V Corps has assumed command and control of all OAR rotational forces.)
- Central Europe | OAR main sites: DE, PL

Security Assistance Group Ukraine (in Ukraine Security Assistance Initiative)
- abbr. SAG-U, USEUCOM, in OAR since 2022 «Група безпекового сприяння Україні», Європейське командування ЗС США (Ukrain.)
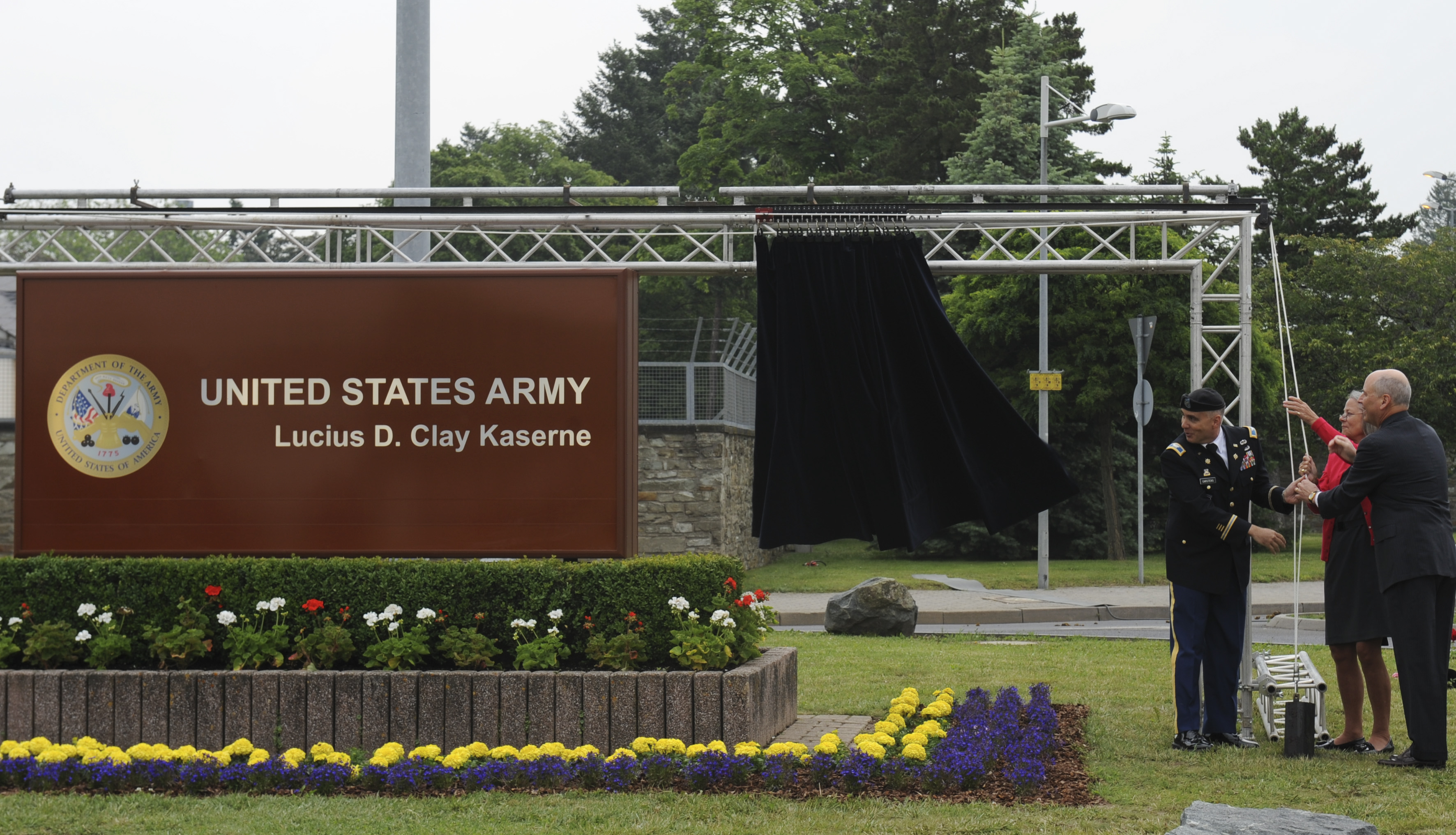
- Clay Kaserne (garrison patron Gen. Clay, Mil. Governor of U.S. Occupation Zone in Germany, 1947- 49). 2012
- Founded: APR 2022 (inaugurated) (Note: As Task Force Dragon, at the Base's Tony Bass Auditorium, funded by European Deterrence Initiative.); NOV 4, 2022 (established) (Note: As long-term assistance command.)
- Allegiance: US Army
- Type: Title 10 combined joint service long-term operational assistant command
- Role: Provisioning of military training, education and equipment to AFU
- Size: 329 personnel as of April 2025 (Note: Including two of its planning directorate placed in NSATU command to coordinate AFU's training requirements. SAG- U's multinational personnel is collocated with NSATU HQ (prior to 2025, with informal International Donor Coordination Centre, IDCC, of more than 50 countries, under UK Brigadier command; IDCC handed over its responsibilities to NSATU). SAG- U US- only personnel includes up to 60 experts at SAG-U Operations Kyiv (SOK) under authority of the Chief of US Mission in Kyiv.)
- Part of: USEUCOM (administratively, within Operation Atlantic Resolve); USAREUR-AF (operationally)
- Command Centre: Clay Kaserne, Wiesbaden-Erbenheim, Hesse, Germany

Commanders
- Commander 3-star rank: LTG Curtis A. Buzzard (JUL'24- pr., US Army, abbr. USA) (Note: As nominated for OAR. Since December 2024, concurrently COM NSATU.)
- DCOM 2-star rank: Major General Duane R. MillerUnited States Army
- Deputy Commander: Major General Kevin V. Doyle United States Air Force (Note: From June 2024.)
- Command Srg.Major: Srg.Maj. Mark Morgan (DEC'24-pr., United States Army) (Note: Concurrently NSATU Enlisted Advisor)
- Notable commanders: (first holder) GEN Chris Donahue, USA (Note: In emergency staffing (then COM XVIII Airborne Corps), as Task Force Dragon Commander, till December 2022. In December 2024 promoted to CG USAREUR-AF overseeing, among others, SAG- U.); LTG Antonio Aguto (Note: USA, from December 2022 till July 2024.)

Operation Atlantic Resolve
- Other name: OAR, Atlantic Resolve
- Founding leader: Department of Defense
- CDR USEUCOM (ADCOM) CG USAREURAF (OPCOM): GEN Alexus Grynkewich; GEN Chris Donahue
- Historical era: Russo-Ukrainian War
- Mission statement: Classified
- Rotation type services: Armored; Aviation; Sustainment task force; Division HQ
- Founded: APR 2014 • AUG 23, 2023 (as overseas contingency operation)
- Dates active: April 30, 2014–pres.
- Country: forward HQ Poland
- Groups: SAG-Ukraine; JMTG-Ukraine
- Headquarters: Camp Kościuszko, PL (Note: Forward HQ coordinates the rotational armored, aviation, and sustainment task forces that train and operate across NATO’s eastern flank, linking together activities in countries like Estonia, Latvia, Lithuania, Poland, Romania, Bulgaria, and Hungary.) 52.4083°N 16.9336°E
- Active regions: USEUCOM AOR
- Status: Active, contingency
- Size: ~ 80,000 personnel
- Part of: European Deterrence Initiative (c. 2022 USAI)
- Website: USAREUR-AF

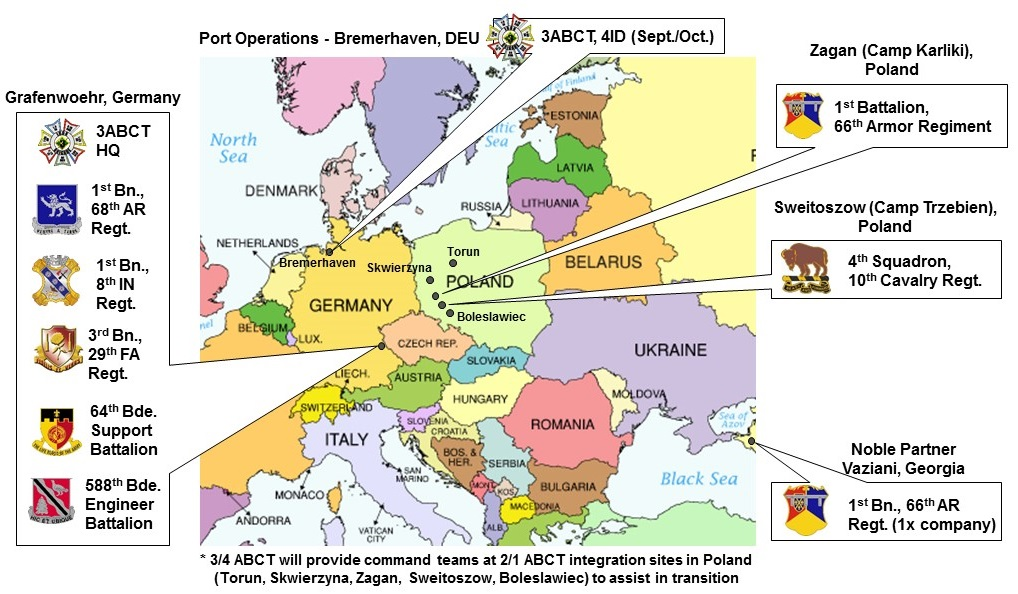
Historical units posture during OAR (as of July '17)

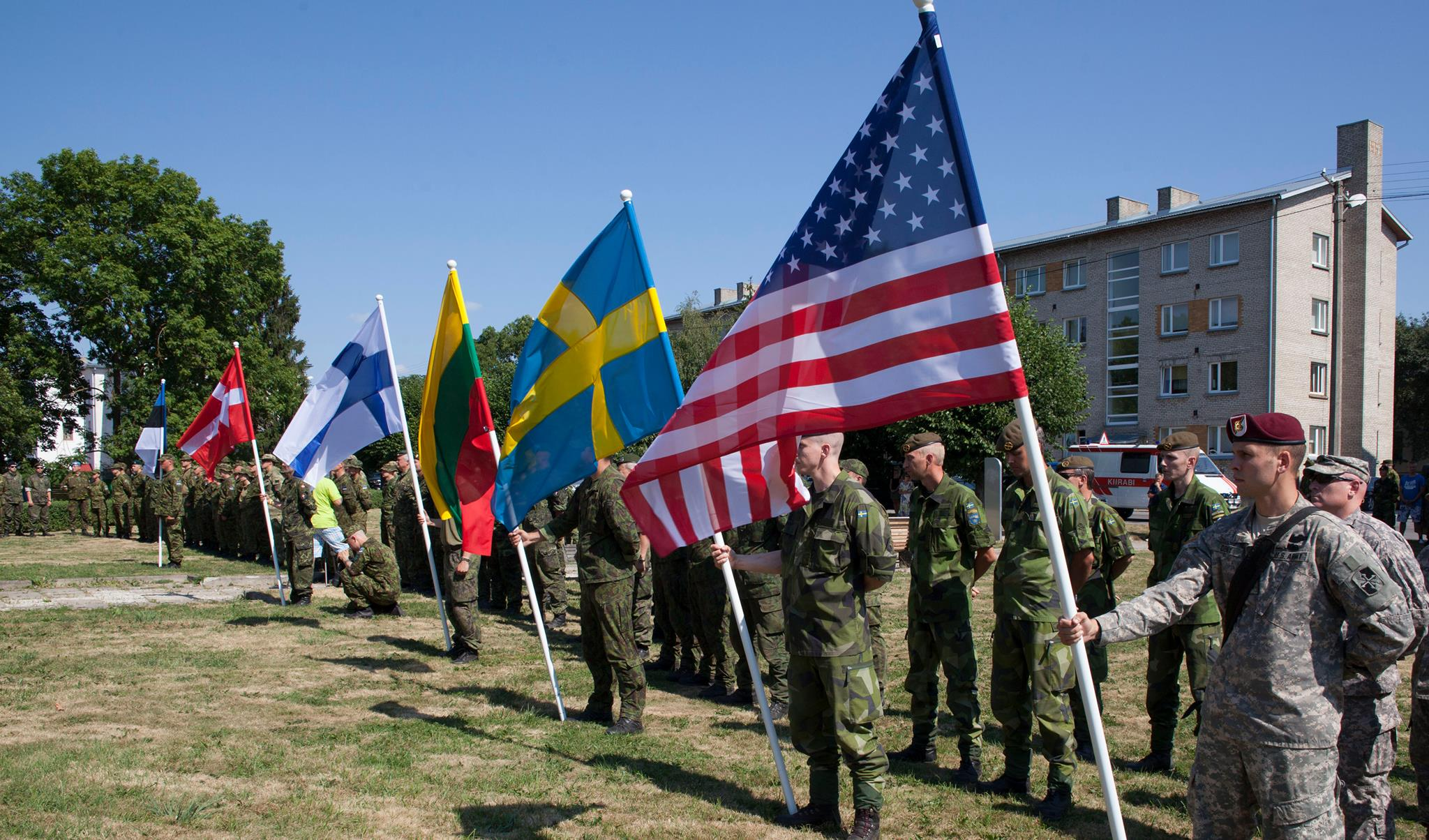
Soldiers from Estonia, Denmark, Finland, Lithuania, Sweden and the United States at Estonia's annual Admiral Pitka Recon Challenge. 19 August 2014

Operation Atlantic Resolve refers to military activities in response to Russian operations in Ukraine, mainly the War in Donbas. It was funded under the European Deterrence Initiative until 2022, and partly by USAI since. In the wake of Russia's 2014 invasion of Ukraine, the US and the UK took several immediate steps to enhance the deterrence posture along the eastern flank of the North Atlantic Treaty Organization (NATO), including augmenting the air, ground and naval presence in the region, and enhancing previously scheduled exercises.

The US described the activities as taking measures to enhance NATO military plans and defense capabilities and maintaining a persistent presence in Central Europe and Eastern Europe. Atlantic Resolve rotations are overseen by a regionally aligned headquarters there. As reported by USEUCOM in the first quarter of 2025, there were no mission objectives and endstate alterations to the Operation after U.S. administration change.

== Aims and funding ==
Operation Atlantic Resolve is a multifaceted military operation by the USEUCOM and allies to enhance security and reassure NATO and Eastern European partners. Though OAR mission statement is classified, its aims include:

- Enhancing deterrence posture along NATO's eastern flank.
- Multinational training events in various countries to build readiness, increase interoperability, and enhance bonds between ally and partner militaries
- Three rotations services: armored, aerial, and sustainment task force rotations
- Land persistent presence: U.S. Army Europe and Africa leads the Atlantic Resolve efforts to bring units based in the U.S. to Europe for nine months at a time
- Three domains exercises: military exercises and training on land, in the air, and at sea, while sustaining and augmenting rotational presence across Europe
- Building partner capacity in Georgia, Moldova, and Ukraine so they can better work alongside the United States and NATO, as well as provide for their own defense.

The "heel-to-toe" rotations of forces in Europe are part of OAR. The European Deterrence Initiative, with USAI specifically, is the mechanism through which activities under OAR are organized and funded.

== Airborne operations ==
On April 30, 2014 United States Army and United States Air Force (USAF) military members were sent to Poland and the Baltic States of Latvia, Lithuania, and Estonia to conduct military exercises with partner nations in an immediate response to Russian illegal annexation of the Crimean Peninsula on March 18, 2014. This was on done on a bilateral basis, not as part of a larger NATO action.

The force consisted of four companies of approximately 150 soldiers from the 173rd BCT (Brigade Combat Team, airborne) out of Vicenza, Italy and supporting Air Force JTACs (Joint Terminal Attack Controller) from the 2nd ASOS (Air Support Operations Squadron) out of Vilseck, Germany. Troops were transported with assistance from the USAF 37th Airlift Squadron based out of Ramstein Air Base, Germany. The four companies were rotated out every ninety days through to the end of 2014 when a more formal version of Operation Atlantic Resolve was put into place.

== Road march ==
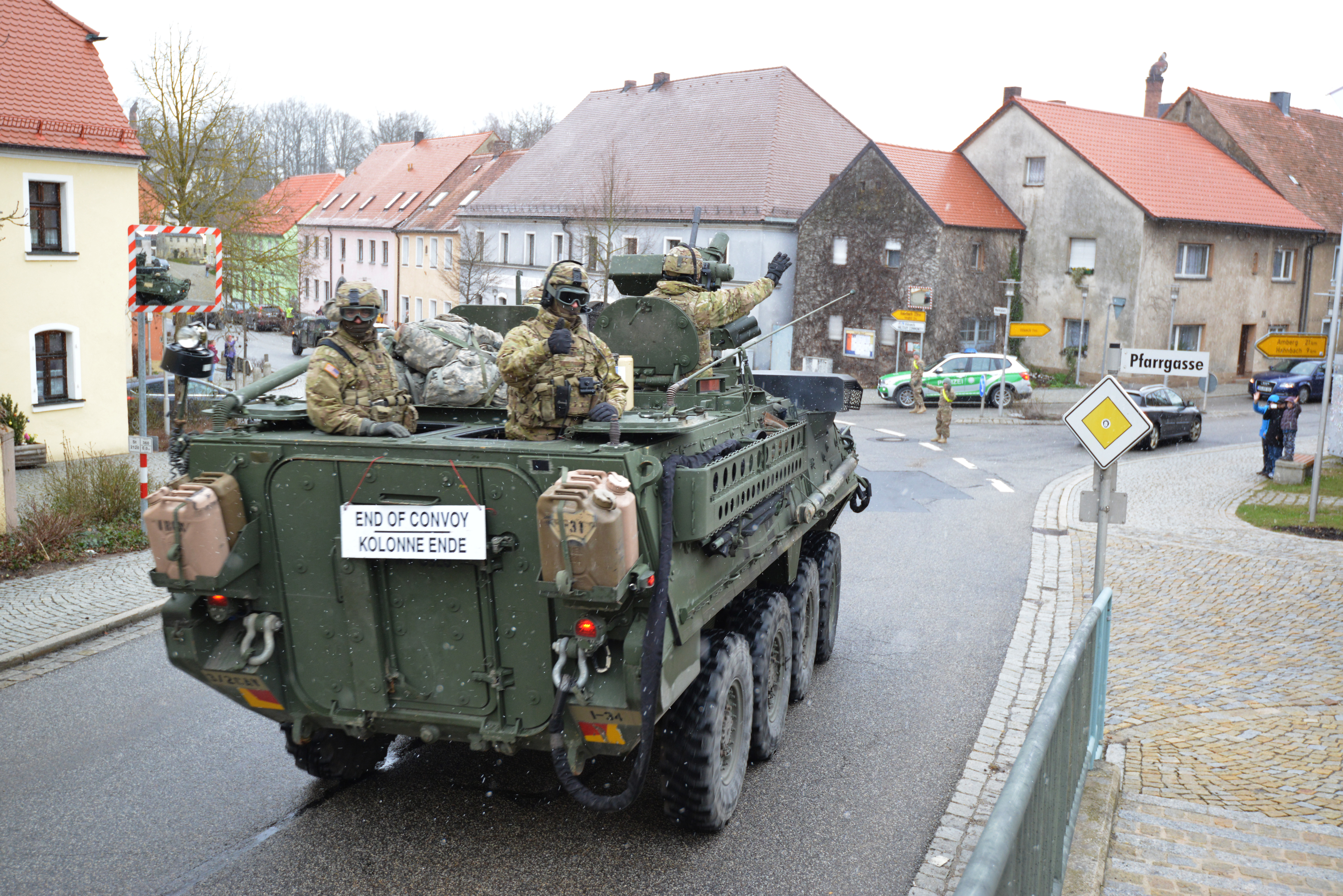
U.S. 3rd Squadron, 2nd Cavalry Regiment soldiers in Germany during the first "Dragoon Ride", April 2015

In March 2015, a U.S. Army spokesman in Wiesbaden announced that a convoy of armored fighting vehicles, including Strykers, would return via road to their garrison at Vilseck after manoeuvres in Poland, Latvia, Estonia and Lithuania. The road march started a week later.

== Assets ==
=== Aerial ===
The aerial assets are mostly deployed to Ämari Air Base, Graf Ignatievo Air Base, Mihail Kogălniceanu Air Base, Papa Air Base, and Illesheim Army Airfield.

==== Air Force ====
The first aerial units were the 159th Expeditionary Fighter Squadron (159th EFS) with McDonnell Douglas F-15C Eagle's and the 123d EFS with F-15C's and a single F-15D from April 2015, who stayed for six months.

This was added to by the following units:

- 355th Fighter Wing = 354th EFS with 12 x Fairchild Republic A-10C Thunderbolt II's between February and July 2015, initially at Spangdahlem Air Base before forward deployed to an Eastern European Air base.
- 442nd Fighter Wing = 303d EFS with 8 x A-10C Thunderbolt II's from August 2015 at Amari.
- 23d Fighter Group = 74th EFS with 12 x A-10C Thunderbolt II's between September 2015 and March 2016 at various bases.
- 104th Fighter Wing = 131st EFS with F-15C's between April and September 2016.
- 144th Fighter Wing = 194th EFS with F-15C's and D's from April 2016.
- 122d Fighter Wing = 163d EFS with A-10C Thunderbolt II's until August 2016.
- 442nd Fighter Wing = 303d EFS with A-10C Thunderbolt II's from July 2016.
- 140th Wing = 120th EFS with F-16C Fighting Falcons between July 2016 and August 2016.
- 48th Fighter Wing = 493d EFS with F-15C's between August and September 2016.
- 144th Fighter Wing = 194th EFS with F-15C's between August and September 2016.
- 125th Fighter Wing = 159th EFS with F-15C's between Unknown and August 2017.
- 159th Fighter Wing = 122d EFS with F-15C's between Unknown and August 2017.
- 180th Fighter Wing = 112th EFS with F-16's from January 2018.
- 301st Fighter Wing = 457th EFS with F-16's from April 2019.

==== Army ====
- Task Force Brawler, 4th Battalion, 3rd Aviation Regiment, 3rd Combat Aviation Brigade (First RAF unit for OAR), from March 2015 to November 2015
- Task Force Spearhead, 3rd Battalion, 227th Aviation Regiment, 1st Air Cavalry Brigade, from November 2015 to August 2016.
- Task Force Apocalypse, 3rd Battalion, 501st Aviation Regiment, 1st Armored Combat Aviation Brigade, from August 2016 to March 2017.
- 10th Combat Aviation Brigade, 10th Mountain Division, from March 2017 to October 2017.
  - 1st Battalion, 501st Aviation Regiment, 1AD CAB, Ft Bliss, TX (OPCON'd to 10th CAB, 25x AH-64s, 400x Soldiers)
- 1st Air Cavalry Brigade, 1st Cavalry Division, from October 2017 to July 2018.
- 4th Combat Aviation Brigade, 4th Infantry Division, from July 2018 to March 2019.
- 1st Combat Aviation Brigade, 1st Infantry Division, from March 2019 to November 2019.
- 3rd Combat Aviation Brigade, 3rd Infantry Division from November 2019 to July 2020.
- 101st Combat Aviation Brigade, 101st Airborne Division from July 2020 to March 2021.
- 1st Combat Aviation Brigade, 1st Infantry Division, from March 2021 to December 2021.
- 1st Air Cavalry Brigade, 1st Cavalry Division, from December 2021 to September 2022.
- Combat Aviation Brigade, 1st Armored Division (United States) from September 2022 to May 2023.
- 3rd Combat Aviation Brigade, 3rd Infantry Division from May 2023 to February 2024

=== Ground ===
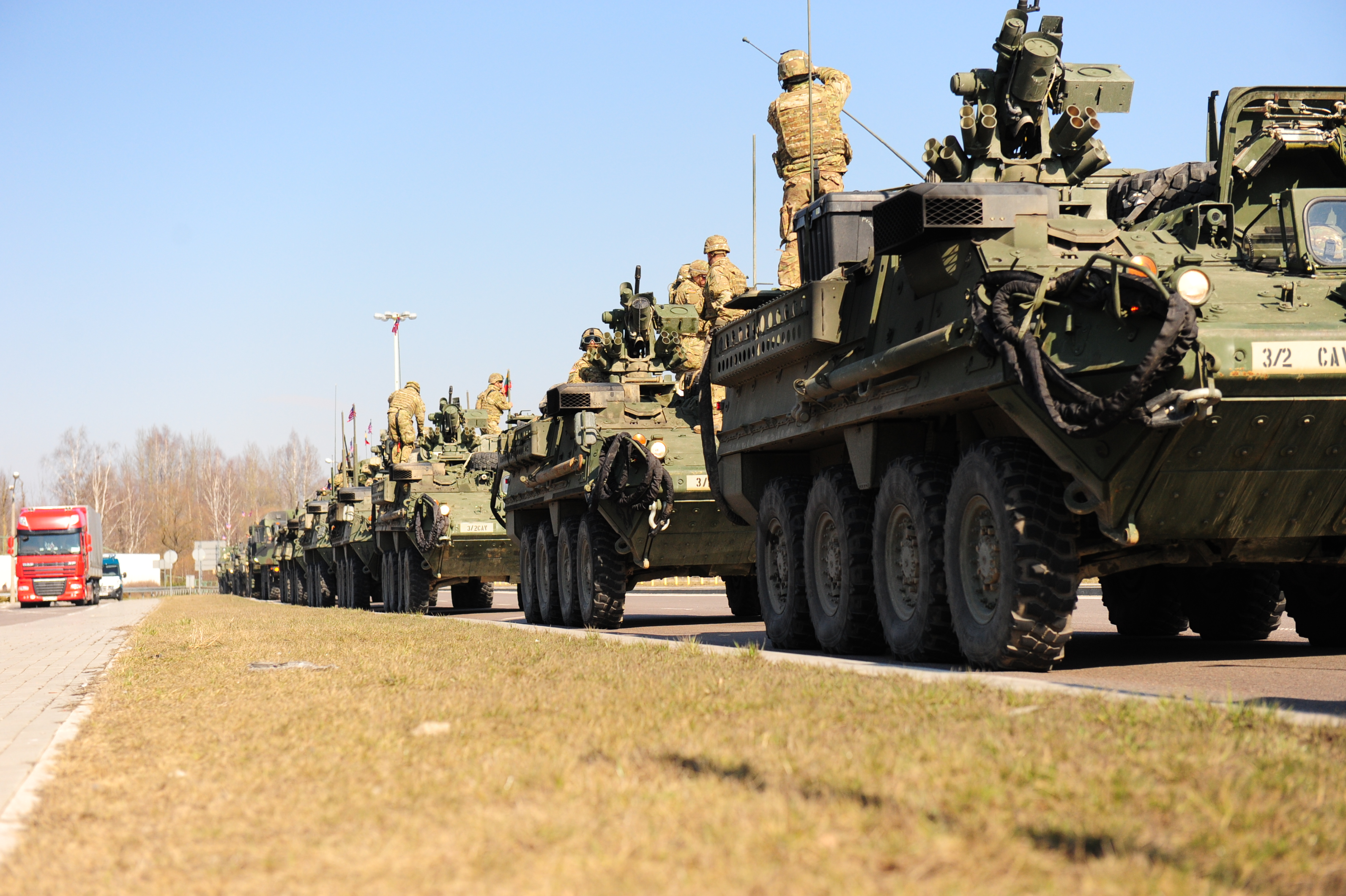
U.S. 2nd Cavalry Regiment Strykers during the 2015 "Dragoon Ride".

In January 2017, there were 3,500 troops from the 3rd Armored Brigade Combat Team, 4th Infantry Division, 87 tanks and 144 Bradley fighting vehicles there. They initially gathered in Poland, before spreading out across seven countries from Estonia to Bulgaria. The brigade is headquartered in Germany. An armored brigade will constantly rotate deployment every nine months. The equipment will be permanently based in Żagań in western Poland alongside a Polish armored division seemingly 34th Armoured Cavalry Brigade, 11th Armoured Cavalry Division. This unit has been replaced by 2nd Brigade Combat Team, 1st Infantry Division in September 2017.

As of May 2018, the rotational force was changed to the 1st Armored Brigade Combat Team, 1st Cavalry Division. The 1st Armored Brigade Combat Team, 1st Infantry Division completed their rotation during October 2019 and were replaced by the 2nd Armored Brigade Combat Team, 1st Cavalry Division. 2BCT, 1CAV was replaced in approximately November or December 2020 by 1ABCT, 1CAV. In June, 2021 it was announced that 1ABCT, 1ID would replace 1ABCT, 1CAV in August 2021.

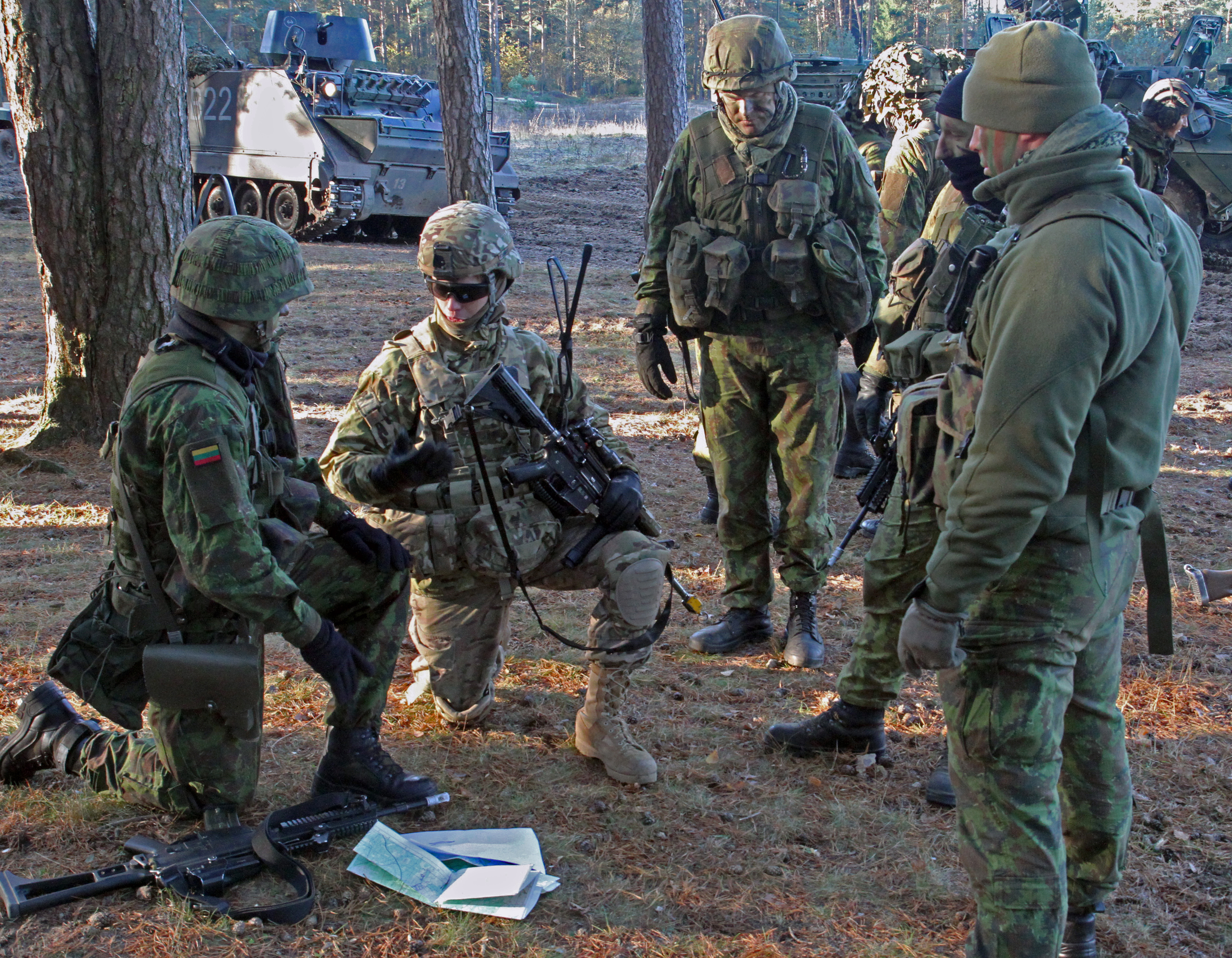
U.S. soldier guides Lithuanian Land Forces soldiers during joint military exercises in Rukla, Lithuania, October 2014

On 4 September 2020, the US Army deployed the 2nd Battalion of the 69th Armor Regiment, part of the 2nd Brigade Combat Team, 3rd Division, for training in Pabradė. They deployed with M1 Abrams, Bradley Fighting Vehicle, other vehicles, and material.

On 8 March 2022, V Corps' main headquarters forward deployed to Germany to provide additional command and control of U.S. Army forces in Europe as part of a larger personnel build up in response to the 2022 Russian invasion of Ukraine.

== Reactions ==
82% of Czechs approved and supported the United States Army-NATO convoy that partook in Operation Dragoon Ride, in an opinion poll that was conducted by the independent STEM agency in 2015.

A NATO deployment in the early January 2017 was welcomed by Polish officials, who described it as a necessary response to Russian military exercises near its border and its military intervention in Ukraine and members of the public as the materiel crossed into south-western Poland from Germany. The same deployment sparked protests in Germany and prompted a critical reaction among the country's centre-left political parties, but was defended by the country's ruling CDU/CSU coalition and German military officials.

An article about the deployment that was published by the Donbas News International (DNI) agency and its subsequent circulation in the Western conspiracy-theory cybersphere and Russian mediasphere was cited as an example of the creation and spread of fake news. An editorial by the Pittsburgh Post-Gazette cautioned anyone against using the deployment as a domestic political tool.

== See also ==
- Fort Trump – Proposed United States military base in Poland
- Multinational Force–Ukraine – Proposed force for peace enforcement
- NATO Enhanced Forward Presence – Forward-deployed defense and deterrence posture in Eastern Europe
