= Ukraine Security Assistance Initiative =

Ongoing US funding program to Ukraine

- (part of military aid to Ukraine during the Russo-Ukrainian War)
- Seal of the United States Department of Defense
- Project type: Security assistance and intelligence support for Ukraine (Note: Including training, equipment, logistics support, and supplies and services to military and other security forces of Ukraine)
- Funding agency: Department of Defense
- Framework programme: US security assistance for Ukraine (Note: with two other programme streams being FMF and PDA)
- Reference: Legislation: Pub. L. 114–92 (text) (PDF); Pub. L. 117–128 (text) (PDF); Pub. L. 117–328 (text) (PDF); Pub. L. 118–50 (text) (PDF)
- Location: Europe; USA
- Project coordinator: U.S. Congress
- Participants: US Embassy (Ukraine); SAG-U (Europe); US SAOs (indirectly)
- Partners: NSATU; UDCG; International Donor Coordination Centre
- Budget: Total: US$33,989.8 million appropriated by Congress as of September 30, 2025; Funding: by fiscal years, in millions (USD): (Note: FY2016-FY2021, actuals as reported by the Department of Defense; FY2022-FY2024, as appropriated. As of Q2FY2025, $33.512 billion were appropriated, $23.29 billion obligated, and $12.469 billion disbursed under USAI since FY2022.); FY2016 US$226.5; FY2017 US$148.6; FY2018 US$195.5; FY2019 US$214.8; FY2020 US$256.7; FY2021 US$275.7; FY2022 US$6,300.0; FY2023 US$12,300.0; FY2024 US$14,072.0
- Duration: 2016 fiscal year – present

Security Assistance Group Ukraine
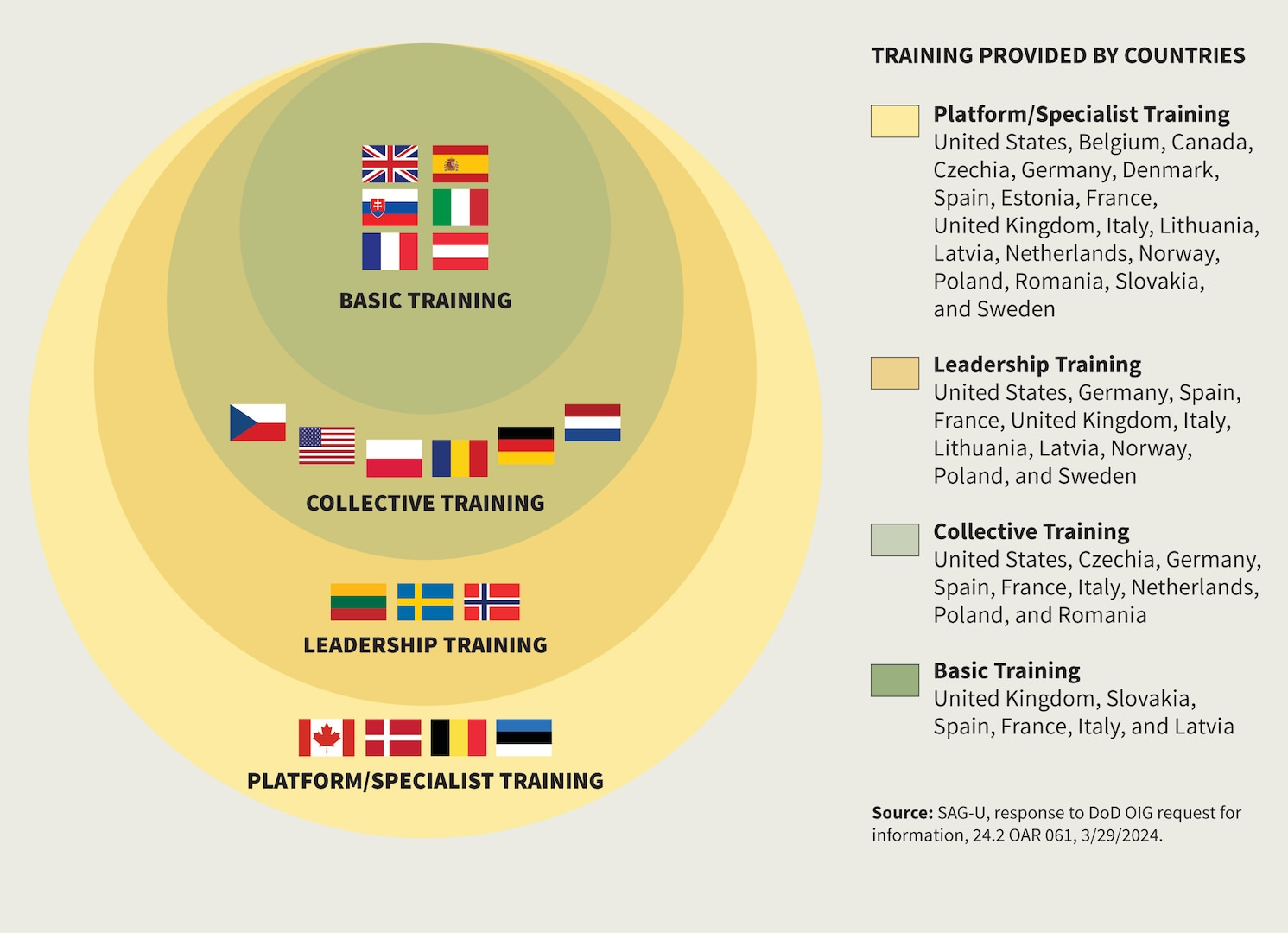
- Armed Forces of Ukraine Training-providing Countries
- Other name: SAG–Ukraine, SAG-U
- Founder: Department of Defense
- Founding leader: USEUCOM (ADCON)
- Leader: USAREUR-AF (OPCON)
- COM SAG-U: LTG Curtis A. Buzzard
- Unit type: Operational command
- Founded: USAI (Ukraine Security Assistance Initiative)
- Dates active: November 4, 2022- pr.
- Country: (recipient) Ukraine (forward basing only)
- Allegiance: United States Armed Forces
- Headquarters: DE (Commd. Center); 50.0498°N 8.3254°E
- Active regions: USEUCOM AOR
- Status: Multinational, active
- Size: HHC-equivalent
- Part of: Operation Atlantic Resolve (as Command)
- Website: unit/SAG-U
- Notes

Ukraine Security Assistance Initiative or USAI is a U.S. Department of Defense-led funding program to increase Ukraine's capacity to defend itself more effectively against Russian aggression through the further training of its Armed Forces, equipment, and advisory initiatives.

== Overview ==
Included in USAI packages were training, equipment, and advising activities, in order to improve Ukraine's defensive capabilities, such as marine domain awareness, operational safety, and capacity of Ukrainian Air Force facilities, as well as its lethality, command, control, and survivability. To counter Russian cyberattacks and misinformation, USAI also supports cyber defense and strategic communications.

The USAI, in collaboration with the United States Department of State, supports a wide range of security assistance activities, including, but not limited to, intelligence support, personnel training, equipment and logistics support, supplies, and other services.

== Security Assistance Group Ukraine (SAG-U) ==
Security Assistance Group-Ukraine (SAG-U) personnel, including those forward-deployed as part of SAG-U Operations-Kyiv, has been providing advising support to Ukrainian defense leaders, including the AFU and the Ukrainian National Guard.

In 2022, SAGU was formed as a point of contact. By 21 July 2022, the EUCOM Control Center-Ukraine/International Donor Coordination Centre (ECCU/IDCC) a joint cell formed in March 2022 had trained 1,500 Ukrainian Armed Forces members on coalition-donated equipment. By 4 November 2022, the equipment shipments, and training measures of the Ukraine Defence Contact Group had become repeatable enough to systematize in a Security Assistance Group Ukraine (SAG-U), based in Wiesbaden, Germany. This long-term assistance command was initially staffed on an emergency basis by XVIII Airborne Corps commander Christopher T. Donohue. SAGU's first commander, Lieutenant General Antonio Aguto, was approved by the Senate on 22 December 2022.

By January 2023 500 Ukrainian soldiers per month were being trained. In December 2024, Curtis A. Buzzard assumed command.

As of December 2025, Security Assistance Group–Ukraine (SAG-U) functions as the primary US-led operational command responsible for coordinating security assistance, oversight, and logistics for the Armed Forces of Ukraine (AFU). Headquartered at Lucius D. Clay Kaserne in Wiesbaden, Germany, the group was formally established in November 2022. To ensure strategic alignment between US bilateral efforts and the broader alliance, the group is led by Lieutenant General Curtis A. Buzzard, who is "dual-hatted" as the commander of the NATO Security Assistance and Training for Ukraine (NSATU). This integrated leadership structure was formalized in late 2024 to streamline decision-making and minimize redundancy across the multinational coalition.

SAG-U operates within a complex international framework, working in tandem with NSATU to manage functions previously overseen by the ad hoc International Donor Coordination Center (IDCC). In 2025, coordination responsibilities formally transitioned toward a NATO-led model to ensure enduring support regardless of political shifts in individual donor nations. Logistics are executed through Logistics Enabling Nodes (LENs) in Poland, which serve as secure hubs for the receipt, repair, and transfer of military equipment.

Beyond immediate logistics, SAG-U supports the Operational Force Development Framework (OFDeF), a strategic roadmap designed to transform Ukraine’s military into a NATO-interoperable force. The command facilitates multinational training pipelines; by mid-2025, these initiatives had trained approximately 192,000 Ukrainian personnel across allied nations, managed through the co-located NSATU headquarters.

== Funding ==
The $3 billion dispersed through the initiative in August 2022 can be used to purchase equipment, arms, and ammunition directly from U.S. defense contractors.

Status of Appropriated Funds as of FY2025Q3

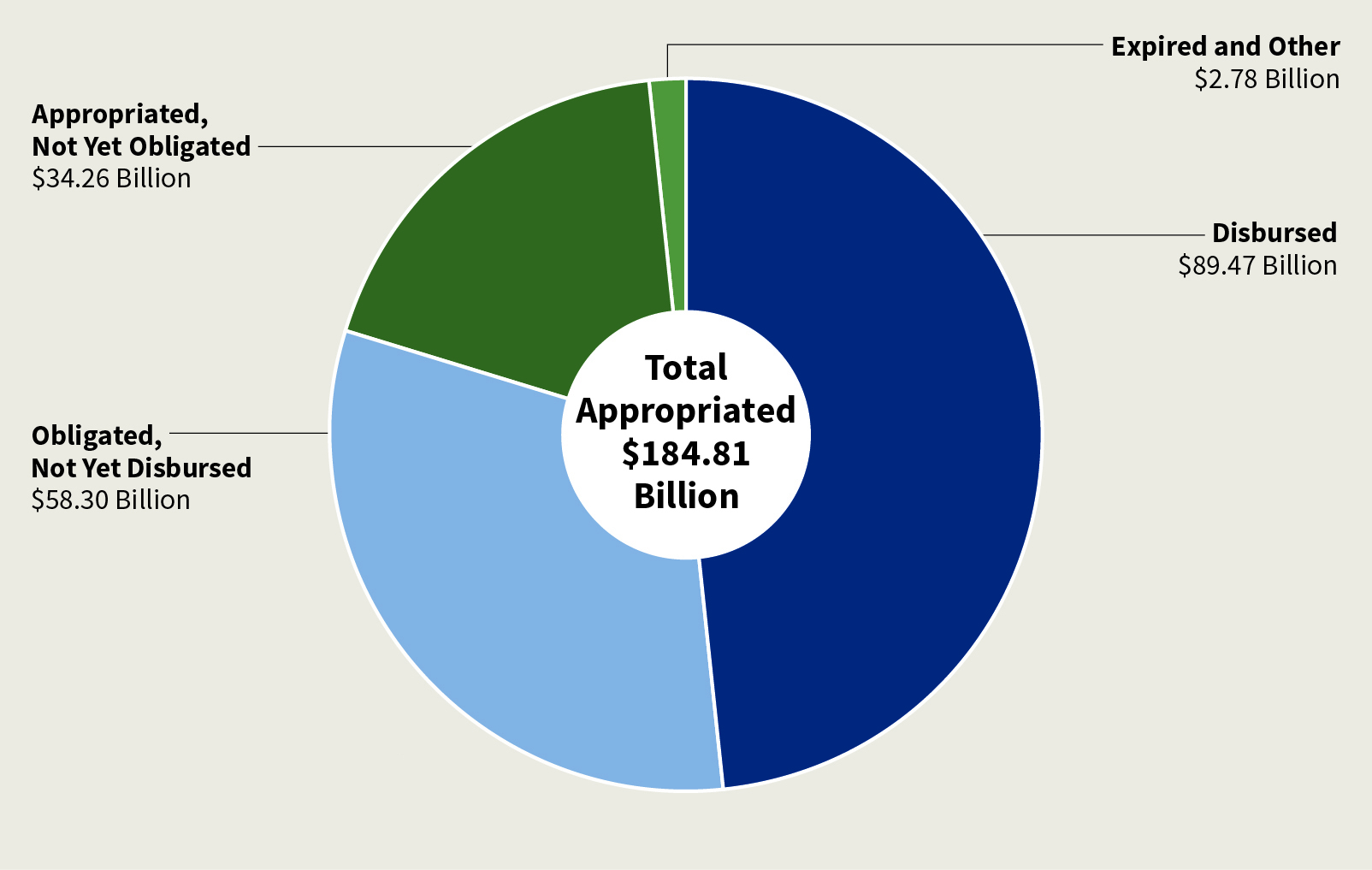
Appropriations under USAI

== See also ==
- European Peace Facility – EU military financing instrument
- Foreign Military Financing (FMF) – US federal government program
- Presidential Drawdown Authority (PDA) – United States authority to transfer defense articles in emergencies
- United States Army Security Assistance Command – U.S. Army command for the implementation of security assistance programs
