= NATO Security Assistance and Training for Ukraine =

NATO Security Assistance and Training Ukraine
- NSATU emblem
- Other name: NSATU, Ukraine mission
- Founder: North Atlantic Council
- Founding leader: ACO (with SHAPE, ADCON)
- Leaders: Christopher Cavoli (July 2024–July 2025); GEN Alexus Grynkewich (July 2025–present)
- Military leader: SACEUR (OPCON)
- Political leader: NAC (DPPC) (Note: Defence Policy and Planning Committee of NATO headed by Assistant Secretary General of NATO for Defence Policy and Planning.)
- NSATU Commander: LTG Curtis Buzzard (Note: Concurrently COM SAG-U (from June 2024).)
- Unit type: Operational command
- Founding directives: Voluntary non-legally binding Ukraine response consolidator
- Founded: July 11, 2024
- Dates active: December 18, 2024–present
- Country: Ukraine (recipient)
- Allegiance: NATO (provider)
- Headquarters: Lucius D. Clay Kaserne; Germany, Hesse; 50.0498°N 8.3254°E
- Active regions: ACO AOR
- Status: Multinational, active
- Size: HHBN-equivalent
- Part of: NATO Enhanced Forward Presence (as Command)
- Website: Official website

The NATO Security Assistance and Training for Ukraine (NSATU), also known as the "Ukraine mission", is a NATO command inaugurated by NATO Secretary General Jens Stoltenberg at the NATO summit in Washington in July 2024 with the stated task "to plan, coordinate, and arrange delivery of security assistance that Ukraine needs to prevail in its fight today, and in the future." NATO stated that the command was to "build upon and complement organizations already in place." The command is headquartered at Clay Kaserne, the U.S. military base in Wiesbaden-Erbenheim.

== Strength and goals ==
Ukraine mission
December 2024 (IOC); April 2025 (FOC); present
- Part of foreign military assistance during ongoing Russian invasion of Ukraine

According to the information released by NATO 11 July 2024, NSATU was to have around 700 personnel to be headquartered in Wiesbaden, Germany. According to the NATO statement, NSATU would have "three main focus areas: oversee training of Ukrainian armed forces at training facilities in Allied countries; provide support to the long-term development of Ukraine’s Armed Forces; support Ukraine through planning, coordination of donations with Allies and partners, transfer of security assistance material, and repair of equipment." The statement clarified, "These efforts do not make NATO a party to the conflict, but enhance support to Ukraine’s self defence."

=== Leadership and command ===
Lieutenant General Curtis A. Buzzard, US Army, serves as the inaugural commander of NSATU and is dual-hatted as the Commander of the Security Assistance Group – Ukraine (SAG-U). Buzzard was nominated for his third star assignment to the Wiesbaden-based Ukraine support command in July 2024, assuming the additional NATO position in December 2024. (Note: Concurrently COM SAG-U from August 2024.) Buzzard’s leadership role as both NSATU and SAG-U commander reflects the transition of support coordination from an American-led, bilateral SAG-U to a genuine NATO-led, multinational command. The dual-hatting also unifies reporting structures and minimizes redundancy between American and NATO systems.

The post of Deputy Commander at NSATU is occupied by Major General Maik Keller, German Army, who assumed the role in May 2025, according to Ukrainian and NATO official briefings. Keller’s appointment represents Bundeswehr commitment to NSATU operations in Wiesbaden HQ and at logistics hubs, with German officers rotating through key leadership positions. Other staff rotations and handovers are subject to the periodic reorganization typical of NATO multinational headquarters.

=== Organizational structure ===
As of August 2025, staffed by around 350 core personnel, representing as many as 31 NATO and partner nations, NSATU integrates several Indo-Pacific partners, notably Australia and New Zealand personnel, and Ukrainian liaison officers who form a central element in requirements identification and real-time operational dialogue.

NSATU operates as a NATO command under Allied Command Operations (ACO), with reporting lines through the Supreme Allied Commander Europe (SACEUR) at SHAPE. Its mandate, governance, and planning priorities are established by the North Atlantic Council on the advice of the Defense Policy and Planning Committee (DPPC), consistent with the NATO Defense Planning Process (NDPP). NSATU does not act as an “operating force,” but instead as a joint, multinational coordination and oversight body for international security assistance and training.

NSATU’s role is distinct from, but closely coordinated with, several major bilateral and EU multi-lateral efforts: the EU Military Assistance Mission for Ukraine (EUMAM UA), the UK's Operation Interflex, Canada’s Operation UNIFIER, the US-led JMTG-Ukraine, and others. (Note: Joint and Trilateral Cooperation: Mechanisms and Milestones: Formal and Operational Integration; From 2025 onwards, joint activities by EUMAM UA, NSATU, and SAG-U to reach operational coherence include: Joint Training Conferences: Used to realign priorities, share outcomes and lessons learned, and agree on standards for training content, delivery, and evaluation. Reciprocal Information Exchange: All three organizations maintain open channels for intelligence sharing, doctrinal alignment, and operational planning to reduce redundancies and ensure resources reach the front where most needed; Joint Equipment and Sustainment Working Groups; The NSATU Capability Sustainment Working Group (CSWG), launched in January 2025, involves three organizations. Its remit includes: Joint troubleshooting of supply and sustainment bottlenecks —particularly for complex NATO-standard equipment now flooding into Ukraine’s inventory. Inclusion of Ukrainian defense industry representatives, paving the way for international contract integration and domestic capability-building; Integrated Lessons Learned and Doctrinal Development; The partnership has resulted in rapid adaptation, among other, of: battlefield lessons - with integration into both EUMAM UA and NSATU curricula and propagated across all donor nations; a shared template for End-of-Training Reports (ETRs) capturing and disseminating best practices, challenges, and innovations N.B.: As of October 2025, EUMAM UA, akin to NSATU, operates only on EU/EU+ territory. Any proposal for in-country training is contingent on a future truce or agreement.)

== Headquarters and operational sites ==
Wiesbaden has for years served as a U.S. Army Europe command hub, and since November 2022, Clay Kaserne has served as the location for the US-led SAG-U before its shift to NATO’s multilateral command after 2024. The selection of this site—a major NATO facility with extensive infrastructure, secure communications, and robust transport links—was intended to enable high-volume, secure operational coordination of bulk flows required by the Ukraine mission.

The primary logistics enabling node for NSATU, a location functioning as the main logistics and repair hub for Western aid to Ukraine during the earlier phases of the war is Logistics Enabling Node - Poland (LEN-P). There is a dense presence of US, NATO, Polish, and other allied forces in Rzeszów; runway activity and customs data confirm immense throughput capacities for weapons, vehicles, and medical evacuations. NSATU's logistics node from early 2025, it coordinates the reception, staging, onward movement (RSOM), and maintenance support for donated equipment and personnel destined for Ukraine. LEN‑P’s operational remit — including RSOM, repair and maintenance facilitation, accountability, and retrograde enablement — complements US DoW's remote maintenance efforts. Specifically, LEN-P works alongside the Remote Maintenance and Distribution Cell‑Ukraine (RDC‑U), which was established in July 2022. The US Army supported RDC-U activities by awarding a major maintenance task order on 5 December 2022.

LEN‑P functions as the physical logistics hub responsible for receiving equipment and personnel, coordinating staging and transfers between donating nations, maintaining accountability and dispatch records. These core tasks are reflected in continuous, on‑the‑ground activity at the Rzeszów-Jasionka Airport logistics hub, a conduit for multinational aid to Ukraine. The significant throughput at Jasionka prompted adjustments in US force posture while logistics operations continued under Polish and NATO leadership. LEN‑P’s physical handling and staging of equipment complements RDC‑U’s remote maintenance mission: LEN‑P moves and accounts for materiel, while RDC‑U provides remote technical guidance and coordinates repair actions. Army Contracting Command (ACC) and TACOM contracting personnel adhered to Federal Acquisition Regulation (FAR) procedures in awarding the RDC‑U maintenance task order. This adherence included conducting market research, developing an acquisition plan, and utilizing a qualified evaluation team, thereby ensuring contractor selection aligned with established policy and operational needs.

Beginning in January 2025, NSATU's coordination of security in Rzeszów includes two German Patriot batteries stationed in eastern Poland to provide integrated air and missile defense of the hub against air threats.

The logistics node at Câmpia Turzii, Romania, is being scaled up as a secondary logistics enabling node. Logistics Enabling Node — Romania (LEN‑R) is a multinational logistics node established to receive, stage, account for, and onward‑move defense articles and personnel destined for Ukraine. LEN‑R operates under allied coordination and host‑nation authorities to provide secure throughput, inventory control, and chain‑of‑custody for donated and transferred materiel.

LEN‑R’s primary missions include RSOM, secure storage and accountability; and retrograde/repair facilitation for materiel transiting to the Armed Forces of Ukraine. National sources indicate Romania has identified infrastructure and authorized personnel to host LEN‑R facilities under national and NATO authorities. It complements other logistics nodes, including LEN‑P, by providing allied throughput and interfacing with US and allied maintenance and contracting efforts. The base, known as "Baza 71 Aeriană General Emanoil Ionescu", houses, among others, US multi-role fighter squadrons and drone units, and is being upgraded according to NATO-funded expansion contracts. As of December 2025, Câmpia Turzii is not reported to be at operational parity with Rzeszów but is being developed as an additional logistics corridor and redundancy, while risk of cross-border traffic exposure in Poland persists.

NSATU official reporting and allied coverage describe NSATU’s coordinating role; public reporting and evaluations document LEN‑P and LEN‑R operational roles and host‑nation actions. The NSATU staff footprint is further supplemented by personnel at SHAPE in Casteau, Belgium, as well as liaison/coordination points at two logistics nodes. These numbers account for the cited "up to 700" personnel figure, which includes "assisting personnel" distributed across NSATU HQ, SHAPE, and node sites. (Note: Exact breakdown is not disclosed.)

== Logistics, maintenance, repair and overhaul operations ==
NSATU draws lessons from earlier military logistics operations. LEN-P’s MRO activity is largely accomplished by commercial contractors, but to push similar efforts into the near-battlespace requires a similar scale but consisting mostly of military technicians. As weapons systems from multiple nations have poured into Ukraine, the need to sustain those disparate systems has escalated; resulting in a call for Field Service Representatives from defense industry.

Interviews with NSATU’s Deputy Commander, German and Ukrainian sources, and UK defense journalists confirm a throughput rate of at least 18,000 tons of materiel per month via NSATU's Rzeszów hub with over 60,000 tracked movements since NSATU assumed responsibility in March 2025.

A critical dimension in official European and Ukrainian statements is that NATO and NSATU do not deliver aid directly into Ukraine. All materials are delivered to and must be collected from designated logistics nodes on NATO alliance territory. This deliberate, repeated distinction is emphasized at the highest levels (NATO, German, UK MoD, and Ukrainian Defense Ministry), and is central to assuaging alliance member concerns regarding escalation and direct involvement in the conflict.

Every two to three months, NSATU organizes maintenance working groups involving donor countries, Western defense industry representatives, Ukrainian officials, and sometimes front-line Ukrainian unit experts. This process has been effective in resolving spare parts shortages (an example being the repair of a Patriot radar).

== Training roles and programmes ==
NSATU’s training coordination function is to harmonize the identification of Ukrainian training needs, match them to allied capacity, for scheduling and reporting processes. Training is not delivered by NSATU staff but by participating nations under the coordination umbrella provided by NSATU.

Prominent among the delivery agents are the EU Military Assistance Mission in Support of Ukraine (EUMAM UA), the UK’s Operation Interflex, Canada’s Operation UNIFIER, and several bilateral arrangements coordinated through the Joint Multinational Training Group-Ukraine (JMTG-U), US-led. EUMAM UA alone, operating through its commands in Germany and Poland, has taken a leading role since its creation, with other major contributors from the US, UK, and NATO international training groupings of no fewer than 18 countries by early 2025. (Note: The Strausberg Model: EU-NATO Training Synergy; The collaboration at the Special Training Command (ST-C) in Strausberg, Germany serves as an exemplar of EU-NATO synergy. In July 2025, meetings between Brigadier General Maurice Timmermans (DCOM EUMAM UA) and Major General Maik Keller (DCOM NSATU) formalized a unified training pipeline: EUMAM UA delivers training for Ukrainian soldiers.; NSATU leads on doctrine, best practices, and evaluation—ensuring that all graduates are not only skilled but NATO-interoperable.) A hallmark of the training system is the involvement of Ukrainian instructors in “train-the-trainer” programs. NSATU actively enables Ukrainian personnel to assume increasing roles in all training efforts.

As of July 2025, output reporting states the cumulative figure for Ukrainian troops trained under SAG–U/NSATU-coordinated programs at over 192,000 since February 2022. The scale and reach of these programs - spanning 140+ different training areas globally - are validated in NATO and UK defense press also affirmed in Ukrainian MoD and NATO press releases. The figure includes ongoing, cyclical basic and specialist training delivered outside Ukraine, primarily in Poland, Germany, the UK, and other NATO states territories.

== Multinational partner coordination ==
Much of NSATU’s day-to-day work is organizing and deconflicting a wide array of partner-led contributions to Ukraine, from logistics delivery and training, to medical support and capability enhancement. This is achieved through direct participation in the Ukraine Defense Contact Group (the "Ramstein Format" with its "capability coalitions" and interoperability standards applied, e.g., donated armor, artillery, and air defense equipment from dozen of countries is fielded without compatibility issues), which have shifted substantial planning and execution burden to NSATU oversight since February 2025.

According to NATO representative Ariella Viehe, NSATU coordinated the first four military deliveries packages—worth a total of around $2 billion and funded by the Netherlands (4 August 2025), Denmark, Norway and Sweden (5 August), Germany (13 August), and Canada (24 August)—under the Prioritised Ukraine Requirements List initiative (PURL), a mechanism to deliver urgently needed equipment from US stockpiles to Ukraine. Major bilateral and coalition contributions highlighted in European defense reporting illustrate increasing European leadership in direct aid flows, with Germany, the UK, the EU collectively, and Norway each surpassed €1 billion in defense-specific commitments for Ukraine in 2024 alone.

Permanent Ukrainian representatives operate within the command structures of three organizations, and senior staff regularly rotate between EUMAM UA ST-C, SAG-U, and NSATU headquarters for briefings and joint planning. European reports point to the embedded nature of Ukrainian military liaison teams, not only in the headquarters but also at each operational node. This structure ensures nearly real-time synchronization of operational requirement signals (supply shortfalls, urgent instructional needs, etc.) with NATO and partner systems.

== 24-month planning horizon ==
The two-year rolling planning visibility window is intended neither as a fixed, immovable plan nor a simple ammunition spreadsheet, but as an operational "forecast horizon" for donors' procurement and training cycles to synchronize with Ukraine’s own force development and sustainment plans. European partners, in particular, have advocated for this approach to provide "predictability for Kyiv" and allow for more efficient long-term logistics contracts, defense industry ramp-ups, and training program design. Regular Operation Force Development Framework conferences in Poland, organized by Ukraine and supporred by NSATU and SAG–U, provide for information sharing and planning process cycling. Interviews with German and Ukrainian staff emphasize the goal of giving Ukraine at least six months of assured visibility into upcoming donations so it can better plan operational launches and minimize the uncertainty of late-stage material gaps.

The NATO Defense Policy and Planning Committee (DPPC) sets the outer edges of this planning, in close liaison with Allied Command Operations, Allied Command Transformation, and, crucially, the Ukrainian General Staff and Ministry of Defense. This is a core part of NSATU’s mandate and is regularly referenced in both NATO documents and European reporting.

== Reactions ==
In early October 2024, President of Croatia Zoran Milanović stated, "The vast majority of citizens of Croatia oppose any and every form of active involvement of Croatia in the conflict in Ukraine" and that he believes the planning and operational help provided by NSATU goes too far.

During a 14 October 2024 visit to NSATU Germany's Federal Minister of Defence Boris Pistorius appealed to other allies to contribute more personnel to NSATU.

== See also ==
- Coalition of the willing (Russo-Ukrainian War) – Group of countries in support of Ukrainian sovereignty
- Multinational Force–Ukraine – Proposed force for peace enforcement
- Ukraine Defense Contact Group – Defensive alliance against 2022 Russian invasion of Ukraine
- Security Assistance Group Ukraine – A US Department of Defense initiative
