= Information Assurance Security Officer =

An Information Assurance Security Officer (IASO) in the United States Army is primarily responsible for the security and integrity of the information systems in his or her area of responsibility.
