= Fort Trump =

Proposed United States military base in Poland

- Poland

Site information
- Operator: United States

Site history
- Built: Proposed

Fort Trump is a proposed United States military base in Poland. The name "Fort Trump" was initially suggested by the Polish government as a name for the facility; however, officials of the Trump administration requested a different name be considered due to concerns the proposal could be perceived as a personal vanity project for the then-president of the United States, Donald Trump, and not a serious military proposal. "Fort Trump" has continued as a colloquial description of the project, or as an unofficial stand-in name for the proposed facility.

In June 2020, Reuters reported—citing unnamed sources—that the proposal had stalled due to the Polish government's reticence in committing to a U.S. requested funding threshold, though officials of both the U.S. and Polish governments have denied the suggestion. A more modest movement of American troops to existing Polish facilities was later agreed.

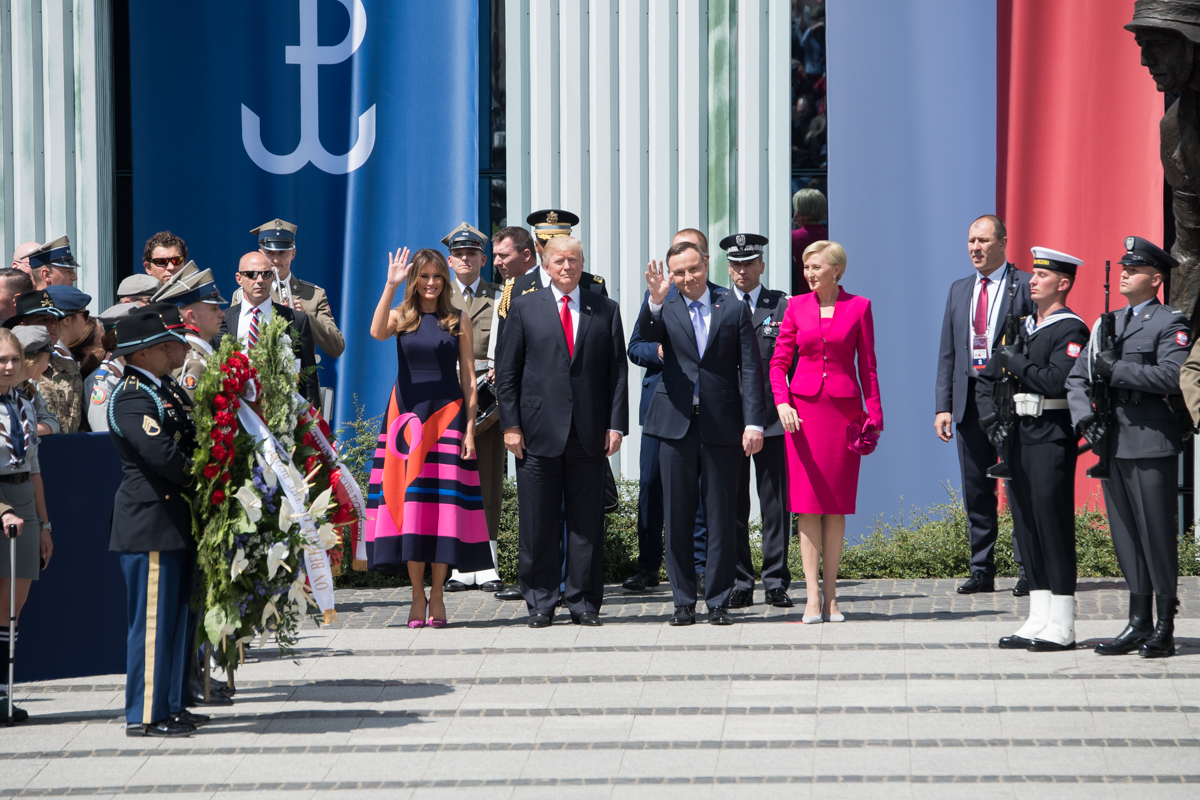
Presidents Duda and Trump and their wives Agata Kornhauser-Duda and Melania Trump in Warsaw, July 6, 2017

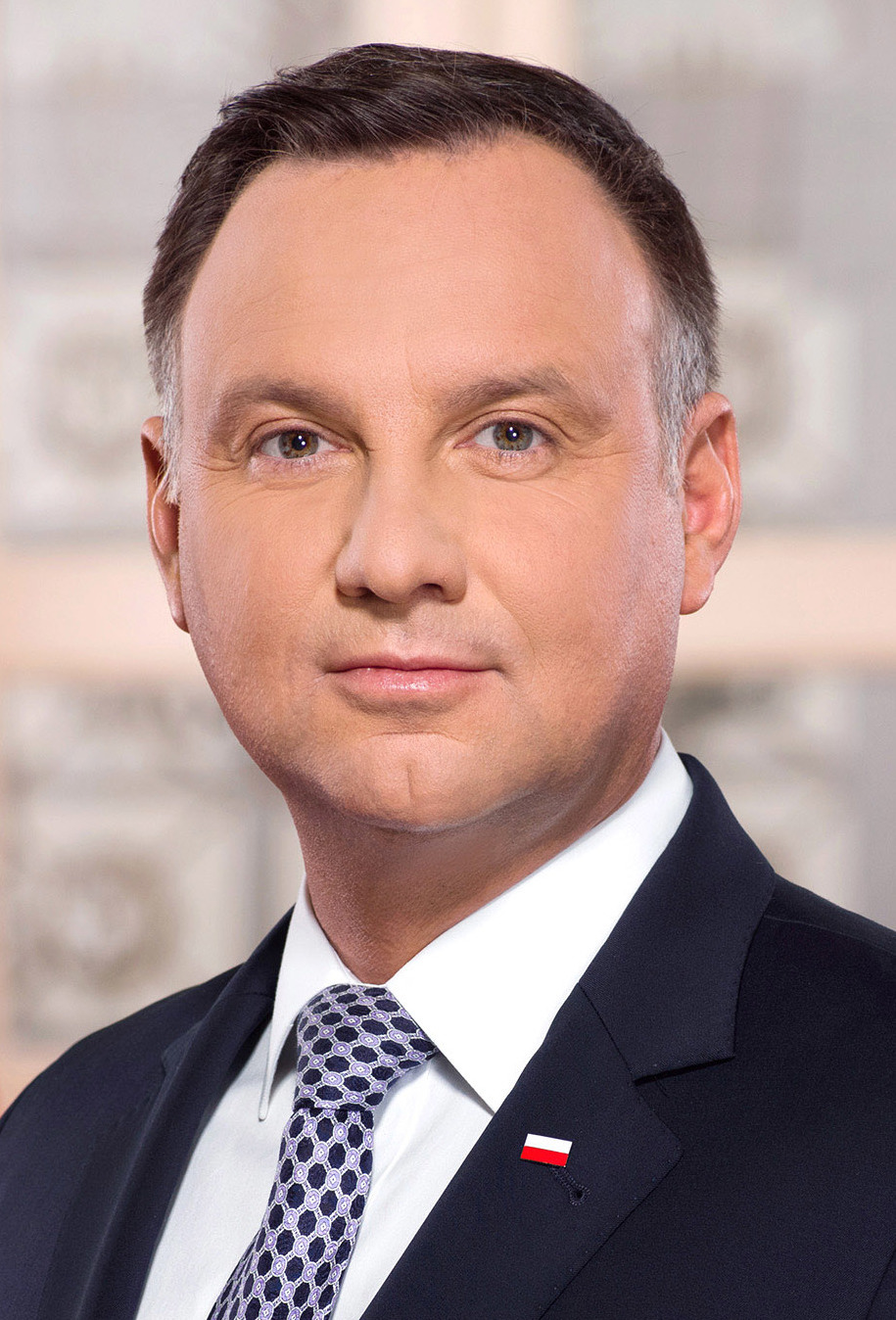
The Fort Trump name was first used publicly by President Andrzej Duda (pictured).

The United States deployed approximately 4,000 military personnel to Poland during the final years of the presidency of Barack Obama with the stated intent of providing a tripwire force to guard against possible Russian expansion into Eastern Europe. In September 2018, president of Poland, Andrzej Duda visited Washington, D.C. to meet Donald Trump, where he first publicly broached the idea of an expanded American presence in the country. During a press conference in the East Room of the White House, Duda stated:

I would very much like for us to set up permanent American bases in Poland, which we would call "Fort Trump." And I firmly believe that this is possible. I am convinced that such a decision lies both in the Polish interest as well as in the interest of the United States.

According to Roll Call, "President Trump considered the words, then raised his brows and pursed his lips before a wry grin took over his face". Another source described Trump as initially reticent on the idea of "Fort Trump", saying only that it should be examined more closely. However, the 116th United States Congress directed a study be commissioned on the proposal.

In March 2019, Under Secretary of Defense for Policy John Rood visited Warsaw to discuss details of the project. The US diplomats unofficially asked the Polish government not to use the term "Fort Trump" as it has been seen as politically controversial, with officials concerned the project could be perceived as a vanity project and not a serious military proposal. It was noted that because the United States Congress controls the American Department of Defense budget, and not the president, such a project would be unlikely to obtain funding from the Congress.

== Later developments ==
In June 2019, President Donald Trump ordered the movement of an additional 1,000 United States soldiers to Poland from Germany. Unlike the Fort Trump proposal, the transferred units would be based at existing Polish facilities. The same month, Reuters reported that the U.S. military base proposal was dead after Polish and American officials could not agree on a funding arrangement, with Poland agreeing to contribute $2 billion to the project, less than requested by the Trump administration.

Both the American and Polish governments denied the accuracy of the Reuters report, with Polish presidential aide Krzysztof Szczerski describing it as "fake news" and United States Ambassador to Poland Georgette Mosbacher tweeting, in response to the story, that Trump and Duda's "vision for increased US presence in Poland will be even greater than originally outlined". A United States Department of State spokesperson later emailed Reuters saying that talks for a U.S. military base in Poland were proceeding on schedule.

In August 2020, United States Secretary of State Mike Pompeo signed, on behalf of the United States, an agreement with Poland by which that nation would accept the redeployment of a further 5,500 American troops – including the forward command post of V Corps – with the potential for a 20,000-person surge capacity. According to BBC News, initial hopes were for the proposed military base to be the garrison of an entire division; the agreement "falls well short of this. But it sends a clear signal about Mr Trump's preferences" and that the concept "could be as much about politics as it is about strategy".

In February 2025, Duda revived the idea of "Fort Trump" as part of an effort to preserve American military commitments in Poland as the Trump administration began peace negotiations with Russia regarding Russia's invasion of Ukraine.

Proposed considered sites for the base include Wroclaw, Poznan and Szczecin.

== See also ==
- Camp Kościuszko
- List of United States military bases
- Operation Atlantic Resolve
- United States military deployments
- List of things named after Donald Trump
