= Operation Dragoon Ride =

2015 military convoy in Europe

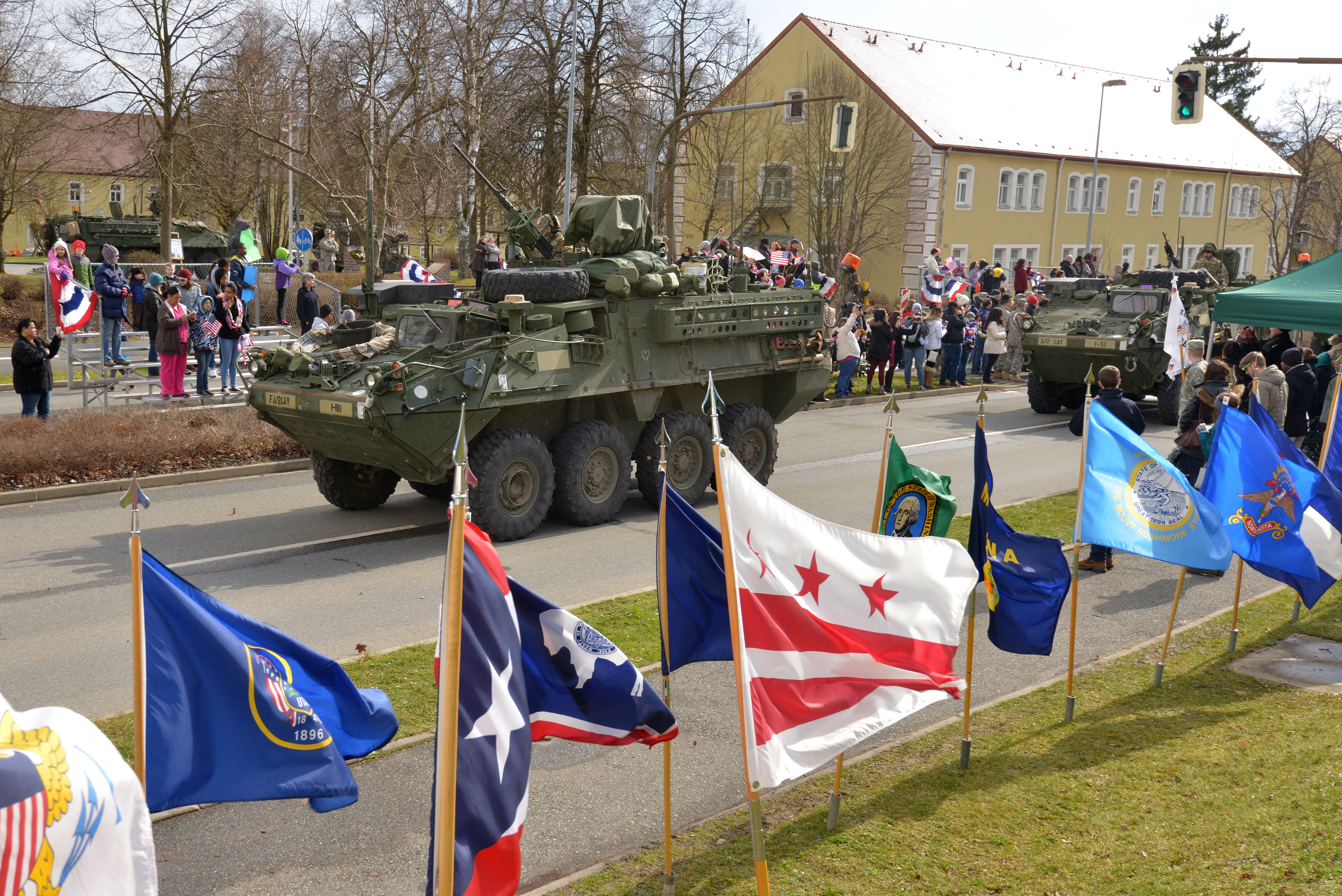
3rd Squadron, 2nd Cavalry Regiment Dragoons returning to their garrison in Germany, April 2015

Operation Dragoon Ride was a 2015 military exercise of the US Army and NATO involving transfer of military equipment and personnel from the Baltic states across Poland and the Czech Republic to Germany, following Operation Atlantic Resolve. From 20 March to 1 April 2015, a convoy of armored fighting vehicles, including Strykers, returned via road to their garrison in Vilseck, after manoeuvres in Poland, Estonia and Lithuania.

The road march was intended to demonstrate solidarity and support for Central and Eastern European NATO allies in response to Russia's actions in Ukraine, beginning in March 2014. The convoy consisted of more than 500 US troops of the 3rd Squadron of the 2nd Cavalry Regiment, nicknamed "Dragoons". 4th Squadron, 2nd Cavalry Regiment “SABERS” also played a key role in the road march. Most noticeable P Troop “Palehorse” deployed for 6 months in Poland in support of OAR that same year.

== Public reaction ==
=== Czech Republic ===
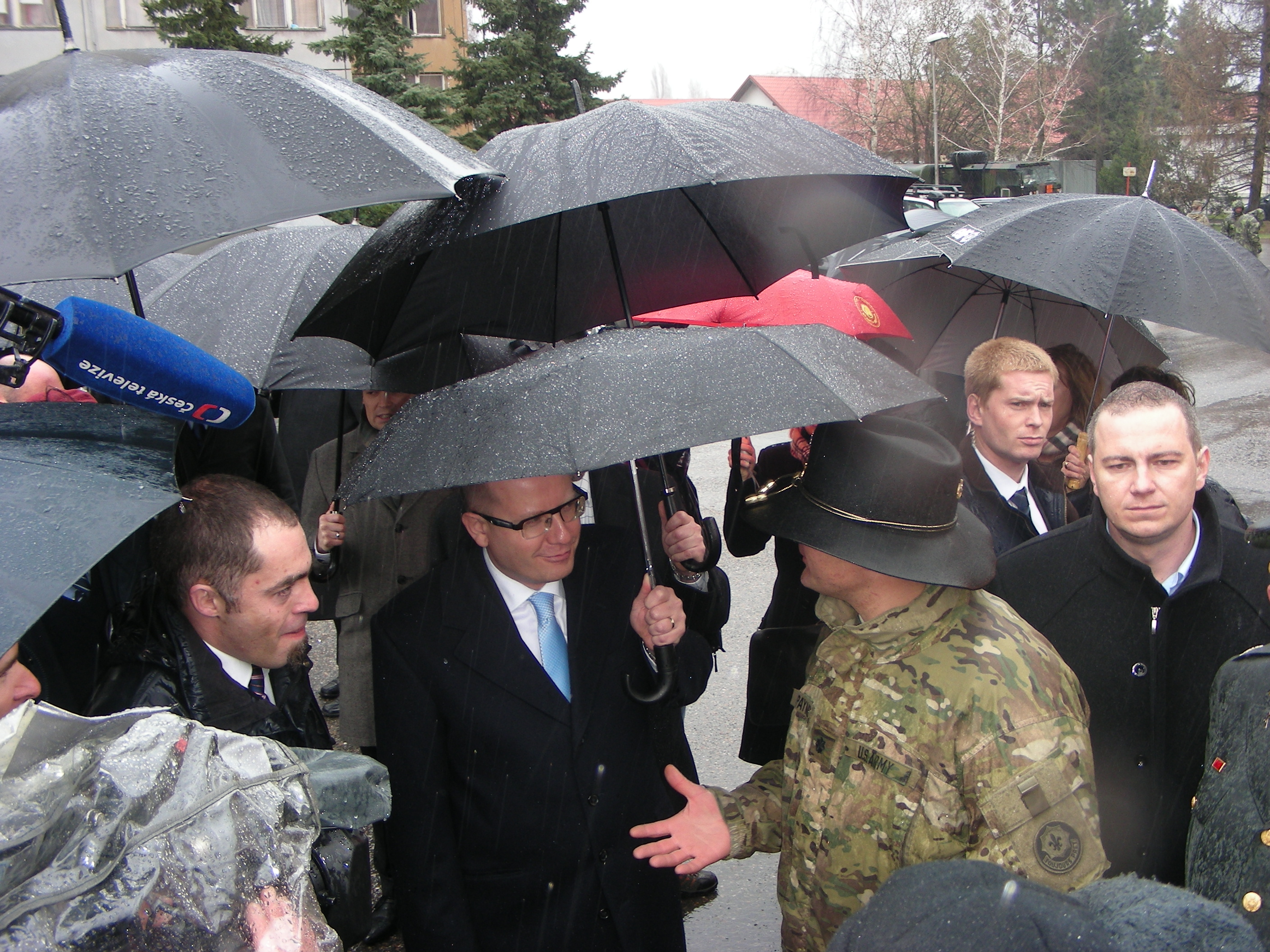
Czech PM Bohuslav Sobotka (center) visiting the convoy in Prague on 31 March 2015

Several opposition protests against the exercise were organized by a coalition of civil society groups prior to the unit's passage through the Czech Republic, including the No to Bases group, the Movement for Direct Democracy, Stop Church Restitution, the Communist Party of Bohemia and Moravia, and others. The opponents were largely outnumbered by supporters of the march, despite reports to the contrary on Kremlin-financed news websites and other media, and despite the pro-Russian stance of the Czech president, Miloš Zeman.

President Zeman criticised the description of the convoy as "occupation forces, because We (Czechs) have experiences with occupations (1938 and 1968) and it looks different." Newsweek stated that the exercise met with a "mixed response" in the Czech Republic.

Several hundred people, both supporters and opponents of the "dragoon march," assembled in Wenceslas Square on March 28. Later that day, the conservative group National Democracy (led by Adam Bartoš, an activist frequently accused of antisemitism in the mainstream Czech media) picketed the US embassy in Prague, opposing what it described as the "American invaders".

After the arrival of the convoy to Prague-Ruzyně on 30 March 2015, the commander Tim Payment said in an interview for the Czech News Agency (ČTK) that "...[the convoy] received unbelievable support everywhere they stopped over." Jiří Vyvadil, the head of the group Friends of Russia, a former senator for the Czech Social Democratic Party (ČSSD), and one of the main organizers of protests against the convoy, was one of the few people who attended the demonstration at Ruzyně barracks on 30 March 2015, and left after being verbally attacked by the supporters of the convoy.

More than 20,000 people visited Ruzyně barracks during the convoy's stay, while a small group of protesters attended the demonstration in front of the US Embassy. Tomáš Vandas, chairman of the far-right Workers' Party of Social Justice, spoke during the protest at the embassy.

82% of Czechs approved of the NATO convoy, according to an opinion poll by the STEM agency.

The Czech Prime Minister Bohuslav Sobotka visited the convoy in Prague on 31 March 2015, with Martin Stropnický, the Minister of Defense, and Karel Schwarzenberg, a former Czech presidential candidate. Both Sobotka and Petr Pavel (Chairman of the NATO Military Committee), described reports of the "divided [Czech] nation" as a "media fiction".

== See also ==
- Operation Atlantic Resolve
- War in Donbas
