= Camp Kościuszko =

US Army command post in Poznań, Poland

Camp Kosciuszko
- Camp Kościuszko
- Poznań in Poland
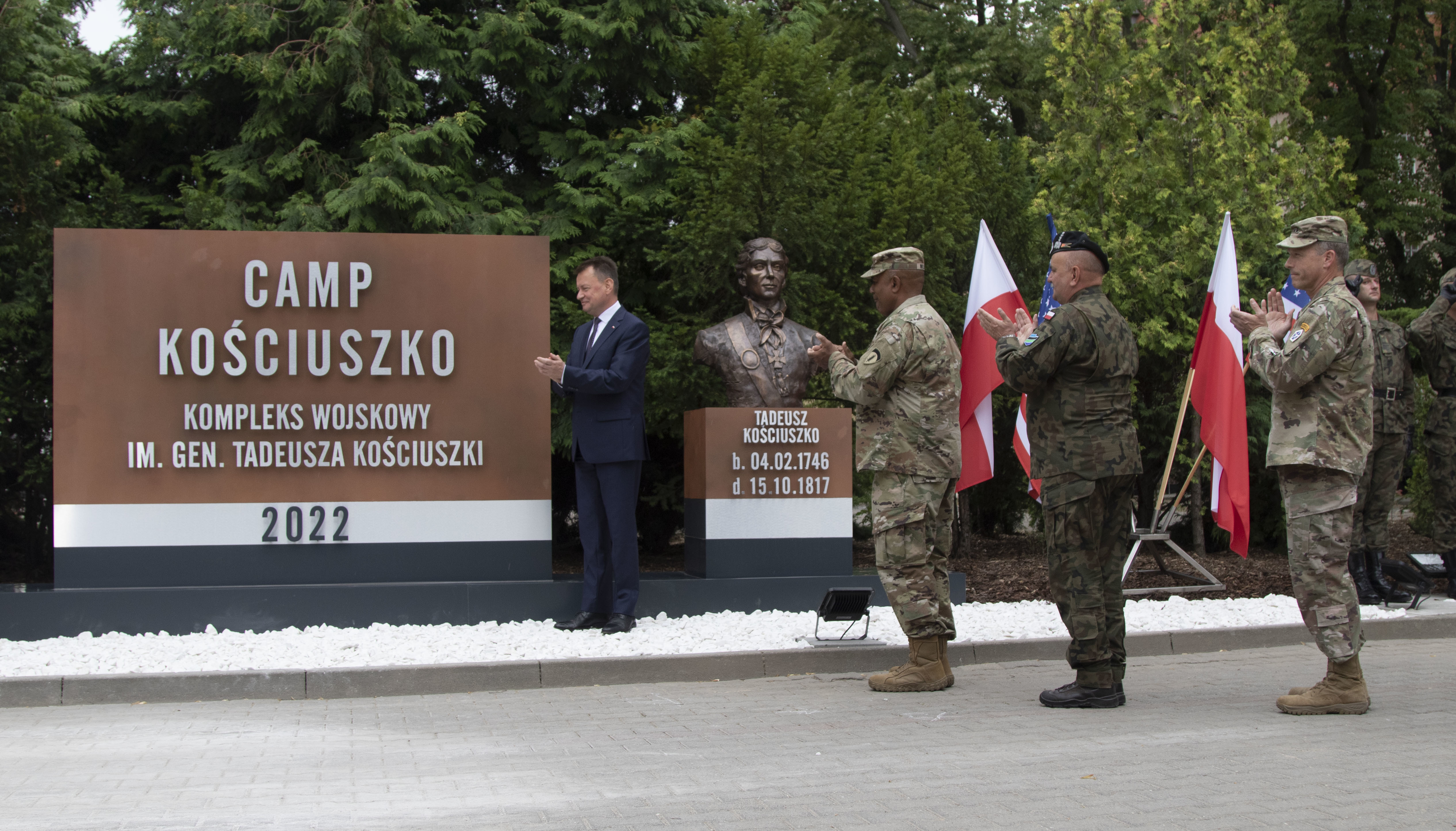
- Polish Defense Minister Mariusz Błaszczak, U.S. Army Generals Darryl Williams & John Kolasheski, Polish Gen. Jarosław Mika applaud as Camp Kościuszko is named

Site information
- Type: Military base, HQ
- Owner: Poland
- Operator: United States
- Controlled by: IMCOM-Europe

Location
- Coordinates: 52.406415°N 16.895693°E

Garrison information
- Garrison: V Corps
- Designations: V Corps HQ (Forward)

Camp Kościuszko is the US V Corps' Forward Operating Station Poznań (FOS Poznań), Poland also denoted V Corps Headquarters (Forward). Forward Operating Station Poznań is the permanent headquarters for V Corps (Forward), which was announced in June 2022 by US President Joe Biden, as the eastern flank of the NATO alliance. The first permanent change of station (PCS) to Camp Kościuszko took place in February 2023. IMCOM-Europe took responsibility for the garrison on 21 March 2023.

FOS Poznań was renamed Camp Kościuszko on 30 July 2022, (Note: The approximate American pronunciation:kosh-CHUUS(H)-koh) for Thaddeus Kosciuszko (Tadeusz Kościuszko), a hero of the American Revolutionary War who is commemorated in the U.S. and Poland. (Note: During World War II a Camp Tadeusz Kościuszko was established in Owen Sound, Ontario, Canada from 1941 to 1942, for training members of the Polish Army and Air Force.)

== See also ==
- Fort Trump
- Operation Atlantic Resolve
