= European Peace Facility =

EU military financing instrument

- Created: 22 March 2021
- Commissioned by: Council of the European Union
- Subject: Establishment of European Peace Facility, repealing Decision (CFSP) 2015/528
- Purpose: Financing instrument

Official website
European Peace Facility
- Funding agency: EU member budgets
- Sponsors: Non-EU members (voluntary contributions)
- Framework programme: EU security assistance for partner countries (Note: Including financing of international military missions abroad)
- Reference: ST/5212/2021/INIT (OJ L 102, 24.3.2021, p.14-62) (Note: Initial text, current EUR-Lex version in effect)
- Location: Africa; Europe
- Project coordinator: Service for Foreign Policy Instruments assistance measures; EC Secretariat-General military operations
- Participants: Ukraine Assistance Fund; European non-EU states; African states; African Union
- Budget: Total: €17,000 million period of 2021– 2027; Funding: (see §)
- Duration: 2021 fiscal year – present

The European Peace Facility (EPF) is a European Union financing instrument set up in March 2021 under the leadership of HRVP Josep Borrell, which aims towards the delivery of military aid to partner countries and funds the deployment of EU military missions abroad under the Common Foreign and Security Policy (CFSP). It was allocated with an initial ceiling of €5 billion for the 2021–2027 cycle. The EPF is an intergovernmental fund separate from the EU Budget, with budget contributions come from EU member states and in some cases, from voluntary contributions from countries outside the EU, such as Norway.

The EPF has supported peacekeeping missions such as the G5 Sahel Joint Force, the African Union Mission to Somalia, the Multinational Joint Task Force (in Nigeria and Niger), the CTSAMVM (Ceasefire monitoring in South Sudan ), or the ECOWAS military intervention in the Gambia.

In March 2024, it was replenished by another €5 billion tranche, dedicated Ukraine Assistance Fund within the EPF. A compromise seemed to have been found that would allow the fund to finance a Czech initiative to purchase ammunition from countries outside the EU. As of March 2024, €11.1 billion of EPF funding has been committed for military support to Ukraine.

== History ==
The EPF was established in 2021 as the successor of the African Peace Facility (APF - established in 2004), with a similar intent to support peace-keeping missions, including through the financing of military equipment and operational capacity building, but with an expanded geographical scope.

The EPF was first used to support the African Union (€130 million; July 2021), Mozambique (€10 million; November 2021) and Bosnia Herzegovina (€40 million; November 2021).

In February 2022, in the wake of the 2022 Russian invasion of Ukraine, the EU first employed the EPF—breaking a long-standing taboo—to provide weapons to a third country (Ukraine), earmarking a starting tranche of around €500 million, successively increased to €1 billion, €1.5 billion and, tentatively, a pledge was agreed in May 2022 to reach €2 billion with a fourth tranche.

On 20 March 2023, Politico characterized the EPF as "formerly an obscure program that has become the EU’s main wartime vehicle to partially reimburse countries for their weapons donations to Ukraine." On this date a deal was made to supply 1 million rounds of 155 mm caliber ammunition to Ukraine "within the next 12 months".

On 13 April, Borrell said that the Council of the European Union agreed on a €1 billion increase in the EPF "to reimburse member states for ammunition donated to Ukraine from existing stocks or from the reprioritisation of existing orders during the period 9 February to 31 May 2023." To that date, the total EU contribution for Ukraine under the EPF was thus brought to €4.6 billion.

On 5 May 2023, Borrell said that the Council agreed to "finance the provision to the Ukrainian Armed Forces of 155 mm caliber artillery rounds and, if requested, missiles which will be jointly procured by EU member states from the European defence industry." This agreement brought the total Ukraine military support under the EPF to €5.6 billion. The press release said that "The supply chains of these operators may include operators established or having their production outside of the EU or Norway. The measure will also cover deliveries of ammunition and missiles which have undergone an important stage of their manufacturing in the EU or Norway which consists of final assembly."

As of 19 July 2023, €5.6 billion had been allocated for Ukraine under the EPF, and a proposal aims to increase the ceiling to €20 billion for four years.

On 31 January 2024, Borrell disclosed that the European Union would fail to fulfil its pledge to Ukraine, to deliver 1 million 155mm shells by 20 March 2024.

On 22 July 2024, the European Union approved the allocation of €10 million to the Armed Forces of Armenia from the EPF. Josep Borrell stated "Security is an important element of bilateral relations with Armenia. The EU has a mutual interest in further expanding dialogue on foreign and security policy, also looking into Armenia's future participation in EU-led missions and operations."

On 25 September 2026, EU member states agreed on a EUR 6.6 billion package from the European Peace Facility to support Ukraine's military efforts. The package included EUR 900 million for the EU Military Assistance Mission in support of Ukraine (EUMAM Ukraine), EUR 1 billion for joint defense equipment purchases, and EUR 4.7 billion in reimbursements to member states that had delivered weapons from national stockpiles, covering approximately 40% of their value. The agreement was announced by EU High Representative Kaja Kallas and followed the lifting of a two-year veto by Hungary in June 2026.

== Receiving countries ==
As of 2025, the following countries have received aid from the European Peace Facility, including years of funding allocation:

European Peace Facility Assistance ($Millions)
Country	2021	2022	2023	2024	2025
Ukraine	$31	$3,100	$1,755	$5,000	
Moldova	$7	$40	$40	$50	$60
(Georgia (country)) Georgia	$12.75	$20	$30		
African Union	$130	$600	$85	$70	
Mozambique	$40	$60			
Mali	$24				
Somalia		$120	$26	$40	
Niger		$25	$44.7		
Rwanda		$20		$20	
Mauritania		$12		$15	$20
Lebanon		$6		$15	$60
(Democratic Republic of the Congo) DR Congo			$20		
Ghana			$21	$25	
Cameroon			$21		
Benin			$11.75	$5	
Jordan			$7	$13.25	
Egypt				$20	
Kenya				$20	
Ivory Coast				$15	
Armenia				$10	
(Republic of the Congo) Congo				$5	
Albania		$1		$13	$15
Bosnia and Herzegovina	$10	$11			
Montenegro		$1			$6
North Macedonia		$1	$9	$13	$15
Serbia		$1			
Slovenia		$1			

== See also ==
- Foreign relations of the European Union
- USAI
