= Prioritised Ukraine Requirements List =

US procurement mechanism

Prioritised Ukraine Requirements List (PURL) is a procurement mechanism for providing Ukraine with military equipment from U.S. stockpiles for the current Russo-Ukrainian war, and more generally, funding. The program was established in fiscal year 2022 (in July) under the aegis of the United States Department of Defense and NATO; more than twenty nations have contributed or pledged funding. The program is extant albeit erratic. Nonetheless, by the end of 2025, 25 nations had joined the inititave.

In March 2026, it was reported that due to the burn-rate of munitions by the U.S. in the 2026 Iran war that the DoD was considering shifting air defense assets from Ukraine.

== National contributions ==
NATO Contributions through PURL ($Millions)
Country	Amount
Norway	$1,360
Netherlands	$1,161
Germany	$900
Canada	$834
Sweden	$543
United Kingdom	$340
Denmark	$253
Belgium	$235
Spain	$175
Finland	$163
Australia	$133
Portugal	$116
Poland	$100
Slovenia	$100
Romania	$59
Lithuania	$54
Luxembourg	$51
NATO Ally	$38
Latvia	$28
Estonia	$25
Greece	$24
Bulgaria	$20
Japan	$15
Iceland	$15
New Zealand	$9
NATO Ally	$7
North Macedonia	$1
TOTAL	$6,757
