= Curtis A. Buzzard =

US Army general

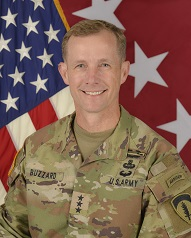
- Official portrait, 2024
- Born: Philadelphia, Pennsylvania, U.S.
- Education: United States Military Academy (BS); Harvard University (MPA); Marine Corps University (MMS)
- Military career
- Allegiance: United States
- Branch: United States Army
- Service years: 1992–present
- Rank: Lieutenant General
- Unit: 82nd Airborne Division
- Commands: Security Assistance Group – Ukraine; NATO Security Assistance and Training for Ukraine; United States Army Maneuver Center of Excellence; Commandant of Cadets of the United States Military Academy; Joint Multinational Readiness Center; 3rd Brigade Combat Team, 82nd Airborne Division; 1st Battalion, 505th Infantry Regiment
- Conflicts: Iraq War; War in Afghanistan
- Awards: Defense Superior Service Medal; Legion of Merit (3); Bronze Star Medal (3)

Curtis Alan Buzzard is a United States Army lieutenant general who has served as the commander of Security Assistance Group – Ukraine since August 2024, and NATO Security Assistance and Training for Ukraine since December 2024. He most recently served as the commanding general of the United States Army Maneuver Center of Excellence and Fort Benning from July 2022 to July 2024. Prior to that, he served as the deputy chief of staff for operations, plans and training of the United States Army Forces Command from January 2022 to June 2022, and as the 78th Commandant of Cadets of the United States Military Academy from June 2019 to May 2021.

== Education ==
Buzzard earned a Bachelor of Science degree in economics from the United States Military Academy at West Point. He later received a Master of Public Administration degree from the Harvard Kennedy School and a master's degree in military science from the Marine Corps University.

== Military career ==
Buzzard graduated from the U.S. Military Academy in 1992 and was commissioned as a second lieutenant, serving in the 504th Parachute Infantry Regiment, 82nd Airborne Division, as a rifle platoon leader. He went on to serve in numerous command roles as company leader within several different units, including the 1st Battalion, 504th Infantry Regiment; from 1993 in the 2nd Squadron, 11th Armored Cavalry Regiment, and from 1997 in the 3rd Infantry Regiment (The Old Guard). From 1999 he attended the John F. Kennedy School of Government, later receiving master's degrees from Harvard and the Marine Corps University. From 2001 to 2002 he worked as a strategist in the Army Staff at the Pentagon.

He returned to the 82nd Airborne Division as a battalion operations officer and battalion executive officer in the 1st Battalion, 505th Parachute Infantry Regiment, in 2002. He later served as commander of the 1st Battalion, 505th Infantry Regiment. Buzzard then served as the US Army War College Fellow at the Center for Strategic and International Studies and returned to the 82nd Airborne Division, where he served as the division G3 and later commanded the division's 3rd Brigade Combat Team. Buzzard also served as the army military aide to the president, serving presidents George W. Bush and Barack Obama. Buzzard served multiple tours in both Iraq and Afghanistan.

On 28 June 2019 Colonel Buzzard was appointed Commandant of the United States Corps of Cadets at West Point. On 4 October 2019, Buzzard was promoted to brigadier general.

In March 2021, it was announced that Buzzard would become deputy chief of staff for operations for NATO's Operation Resolute Support, which trains and assists Afghan Security Forces; deputy commanding general for operations for U.S. Forces-Afghanistan (USFOR-A); and commander of U.S. National Support Element Command-Afghanistan for Operation Freedom's Sentinel (part of Resolute Support). After the 2021 US withdrawal from Afghanistan, Buzzard will lead the Defense Security Cooperation Management Office Afghanistan in Qatar. He will administer funding and over-the-horizon aircraft maintenance support for the Afghan National Defense and Security Forces, also supporting the newly-formed US Forces Afghanistan Forward, in charge of American troops in Afghanistan. He assumed command in late July.

In July 2021, Buzzard was nominated for promotion to major general. He was reassigned as commanding general of the U.S. Army Maneuver Center of Excellence in March 2022, and assumed command on 14 July 2022.

In July 2024, Buzzard was nominated for promotion to lieutenant general and assignment as commander of Security Assistance Group–Ukraine. He assumed the additional command of NATO Security Assistance and Training for Ukraine, Operation Atlantic Resolve, in December 2024. In November 2025 he was part of a delegation led by U.S. Army Secretary Daniel P. Driscoll to Ukraine for peace negotiations in the Russo-Ukrainian war.

== Personal life ==
He is married to a registered nurse and former Army officer. They have three daughters, and two of them are currently officers in the Navy.

== Awards and decorations ==
His awards include:

- Army Distinguished Service Medal
- Defense Superior Service Medal (2 awards)
- Legion of Merit (4 awards)
- Bronze Star Medal (3 awards)
- Meritorious Service Medal (6 awards)
- Army Commendation Medal (3 awards)
- Air Assault Badge
- Army Staff Badge
- Combat Infantryman's Badge
- Expert Infantryman's Badge
- Master Combat Infantryman's Badge
- Master Parachutist Badge
- Presidential Service Badge
- Ranger Tab
- Numerous foreign jump wings
- Order of Merit, 3rd degree (Ukraine).

Military offices
Preceded by Steven W. Gilland	Commandant of Cadets of the United States Military Academy; 2019–2021	Succeeded by Mark C. Quander
New office	Director of the Defense Security Cooperation Management Office-Afghanistan; 2021	Succeeded by John T. Reim Jr.
Preceded by Christopher C. LaNeve	Deputy Chief of Staff for Operations, Plans and Training of United States Army Forces Command; 2022	Succeeded by Scott M. Naumann
Preceded by Patrick J. Donahoe	Commanding General of the United States Army Maneuver Center of Excellence; 2022–2024	Succeeded by Colin P. Tuley
Preceded by Antonio Aguto	Commander of Security Assistance Group – Ukraine; 2024–present	Incumbent
New title	Commander of NATO Security Assistance and Training for Ukraine; 2024–present	Incumbent
