= Multinational force =

Multinational military operation

A multinational force is a multinational operation which may be defensive, offensive, or for peacekeeping purposes. In multinational operations, many countries form an alliance to carry them out.

Multinational forces include:

- Supreme Headquarters Allied Expeditionary Force (1943-1945)
- Multinational Force and Observers (1981-present)
- Multinational Force in Lebanon (1982-1984)
- Operation Uphold Democracy (1994-1995)
- United Nations Command (1950-present)
- Free World Military Assistance Forces (1965-1973)
- Caribbean Peace Force (1983-1985)

NATO

- IFOR (1995-1996)
- SFOR (1996-2004)
- International Security Assistance Force (2001-2014)
- NATO Response Force (2003-2024)
- EUFOR (2004-present)

Iraq

- Multi-National Corps - Iraq (2004-2009)
  - Multinational Division Central-South (2003-2008)
- Multi-national Force - Iraq (2004-2009)
  - Multi-National Force West (2004-2010)

== See also ==
- International Police
- Coalition of the willing
- Military alliance
- List of non-UN peacekeeping missions
