= Antonio Aguto =

U.S. Army general (born 1966)

Antonio A. Aguto Jr.
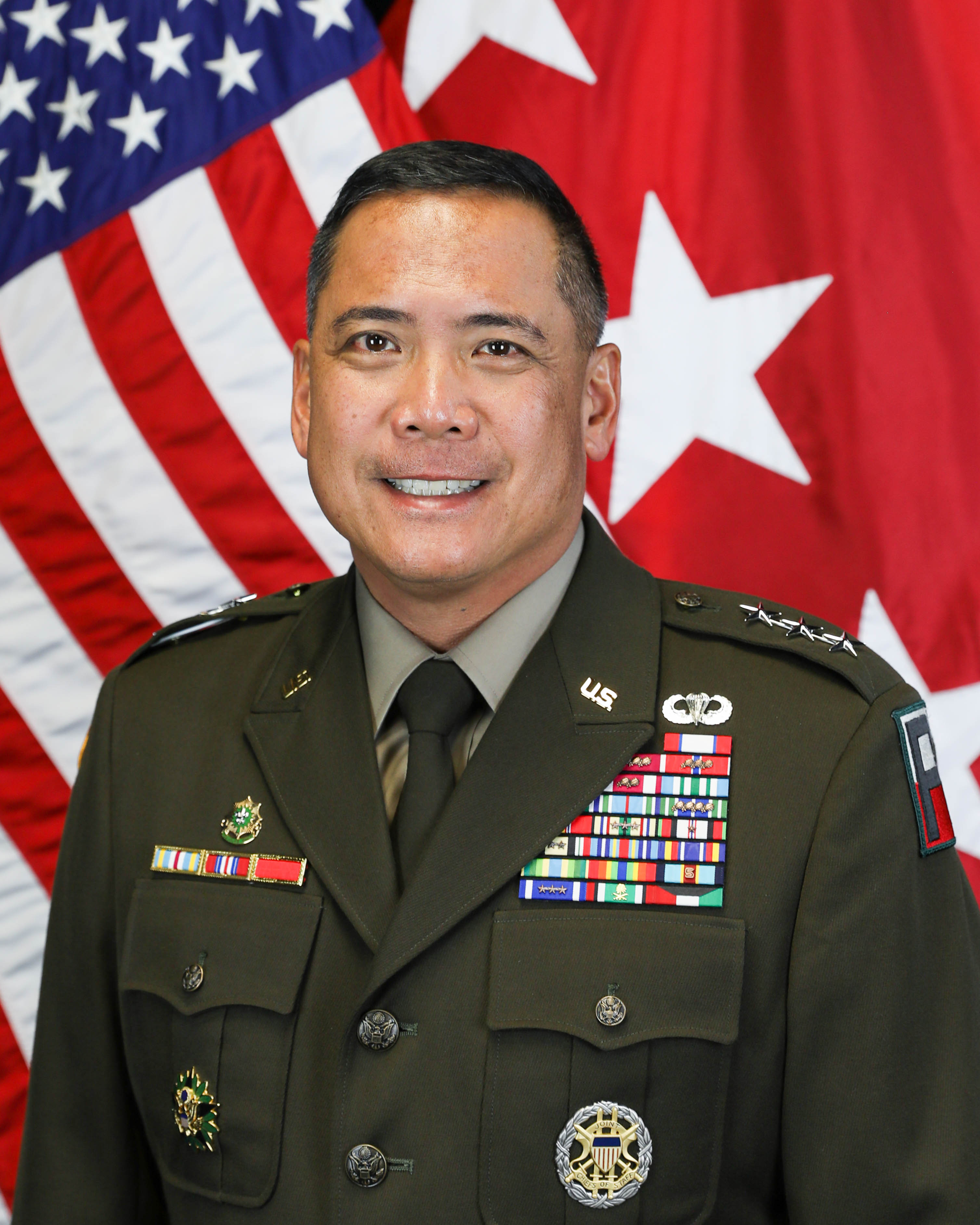
- Born: 18 November 1966 (age 59); Illinois, U.S.
- Education: United States Military Academy; United States Army Command and General Staff College; United States Naval War College
- Military career
- Allegiance: United States
- Branch: United States Army
- Service years: 1988–2024
- Rank: Lieutenant general Major general (retired)
- Nickname: Tony
- Commands: Security Assistance Group–Ukraine; First United States Army; 3rd Infantry Division; 7th Army Training Command; 11th Armored Cavalry Regiment; 4th Squadron, 2nd Stryker Cavalry Regiment
- Conflicts: Gulf War; War in Afghanistan; Iraq War
- Awards: Army Distinguished Service Medal; Legion of Merit (4); Bronze Star Medal (4)

Antonio Alzona Aguto Jr. (born 18 November 1966) is a retired American major general who last served as the commander of Security Assistance Group–Ukraine (SAGU) from 2022 to 2024 at the grade of lieutenant general. Before that, he was the commanding general of First Army from 2021 to 2022 and the commanding general of the 3rd Infantry Division from 2019 to 2021. Aguto was commissioned from the United States Military Academy in 1988 as an Armor officer and had multiple deployments to Afghanistan, Iraq, and Bosnia-Herzegovina.

== Early life and education ==
Antonio Alzona Aguto Jr. was born on 18 November 1966. His grandfather served in the Philippine Scouts during World War II and became a captain in the United States Army. Aguto graduated from the United States Military Academy in 1988 with a Bachelor of Science degree in aerospace engineering. He later also graduated from the United States Army Command and General Staff College and the United States Naval War College.

== Army career ==
Aguto was commissioned an armor officer from the United States Military Academy in 1988. As a young officer he served as a tank platoon leader, company executive officer and support platoon leader in the 4th Squadron, 8th Cavalry Regiment, 3rd Armored Division United States Army Europe during Operations Desert Shield/Desert Storm. Aguto later served as an armor company commander in 2nd Battalion, 64th Armor, 3rd Infantry Division and Headquarters Commander 1st Battalion, 77th Armor, 1st Infantry Division, United States Army Europe during operations in Bosnia and Herzegovina; and aide-de-camp to the commander of 1st Infantry Division.

Aguto later served as operations officer, J33 Readiness Division, Joint Staff and HQDA G3 Army Operations Center, Readiness Division. Following Command and General Staff College, Aguto served as squadron operations and executive officer, 3rd Armored Cavalry Regiment and as the regimental executive officer while deployed to Operation Iraqi Freedom from 2003 to 2004. From November 2005 to June 2006, Aguto commanded 2nd Squadron, 14th Cavalry Regiment, 1st Stryker Brigade Combat Team, 25th Infantry Division, Fort Lewis, Washington. Aguto became the commander of 4th Squadron, 2nd Stryker Cavalry Regiment after 1st Brigade reflagged to the 2nd Stryker Cavalry Regiment on 1 June 2006 in Vilseck, Germany. He commanded the squadron in support of Operation Iraqi Freedom in Baghdad and Diyala, Iraq from 2007 to 2008.

From 2010 to 2012, Aguto commanded the 11th Armored Cavalry Regiment at the National Training Center, Fort Irwin, California. From 2012 to 2015, Aguto worked for the Army's Training and Doctrine Command both as the Chief of Staff, Combined Arms Center, Fort Leavenworth, Kansas and the executive officer to the commanding general, Fort Eustis, Virginia. Aguto was assigned as the deputy commanding general of operations, 7th Infantry Division, Joint Base Lewis-McChord, Washington, from 2015 to 2016. During that time, he deployed to Kandahar, Afghanistan to serve concurrently as the commanding general for Combined Joint Task Force-7 (CJTF-7), Train, Advise, Assist Command - South (TAAC-S) as part of Operation Freedom's Sentinel and the NATO Resolute Support Mission. He was the Deputy Chief of Staff for Operations, Plans, and Training (G-3/5/7) of U.S. Army Forces Command from May 2018 to May 2019.

Aguto took command as the commanding general of the 3rd Infantry Division on 3 June 2019 at Fort Stewart, Georgia. During his tenure, the division provided support during Hurricane Dorian and experienced the COVID-19 pandemic. He relinquished command of the division on 21 June 2021. After that, Aguto became the 40th commanding general of the United States First Army on 8 July 2021 at Rock Island Arsenal, Illinois. In November 2022 it was reported that Aguto was considered the leading candidate to become the first commander of the Security Assistance Group–Ukraine (SAGU), which was formed in Germany to replace the XVIII Airborne Corps in the role of supporting the Armed Forces of Ukraine during the Russo-Ukrainian war. Aguto relinquished command of First Army on 2 December 2022 and took up his post as the commander of SAGU on 9 December.

=== Security Assistance Group–Ukraine ===
As of December 2023 Aguto was dispatched to Ukraine to improve the quality of advice afforded Ukraine during the winter offensive, because Ukrainian officials have asked their counterparts for more "face time with senior military officials". Aguto has warned of the vulnerability of U.S. precision guided weapons to electronic warfare in the Russo-Ukrainian war.

In March 2026, a U.S. Department of Defense Inspector General report detailed two incidents involving Aguto during his tenure as commander of Security Assistance Group–Ukraine. In April 2024, a tube containing Secret-level maps was left on a train during travel from Ukraine to the European Union, resulting in a temporary loss of control of classified materials for about 24 hours before the maps were recovered and returned reportedly untouched. The investigation found the documents had not been transported using required courier procedures.

The report also described a May 2024 incident in Kyiv in which Aguto attended a lengthy official dinner where he consumed significant amounts of alcohol. After the dinner he fell and struck his head, and the following morning appeared disoriented and lethargic before a scheduled meeting with U.S. Secretary of State Antony Blinken. He fell again while traveling to the U.S. Embassy and was later taken to a hospital, where he was diagnosed with a concussion. Investigators concluded the falls were linked to alcohol overconsumption and noted he had not obtained the required waiver to exceed the military's two-drink limit at official events.

The investigation began after anonymous complaints in May 2024 and also examined allegations of a toxic command climate, which were not substantiated. Aguto was the Commanding General of SAG-U, serving in the grade of lieutenant general. Aguto relinquished command of Security Assistance Group–Ukraine on 5 August 2024. He was conditionally retired as a major general effective 1 November 2024. Aguto was succeeded by Lt. Gen. Curtis A. Buzzard on 5 August 2024.

== Awards and decorations ==
Aguto's awards and decorations include the Legion of Merit (4 oak leaf clusters), Bronze Star Medal (3 oak leaf clusters), the Meritorious Service Medal (2 oak leaf clusters), the Joint Staff Commendation Medal, the Army Commendation Medal (2 oak leaf clusters), the Joint Staff Achievement Medal, Army Achievement Medal (4 oak leaf clusters), the National Defense Service Medal (2 awards), NATO Medal, Parachutist Badge, Army and Joint Staff Badges.

Military offices
| Preceded by Christopher G. Cavoli | Commanding General of the 7th Army Training Command; 2016–2018 | Succeeded by Christopher C. LaNeve |
| Preceded by Leopoldo A. Quintas | Commanding General of the 3rd Infantry Division; 2019–2021 | Succeeded by Charles D. Costanza |
| Preceded by Thomas S. James Jr. | Commanding General of the First United States Army; 2021–2022 | Succeeded by Mark H. Landes; Acting |
| Command established | Commander of Security Assistance Group-Ukraine; 2022–2024 | Succeeded by Curtis A. Buzzard |
