= Disbursement =

Form of payment, especially from a public fund

A disbursement is a form of payment from a public or dedicated fund. Alternatively, it means a payment made on behalf of a client to a third party, for which reimbursement is subsequently sought from the client.

It is a term most commonly used by solicitors in the UK to refer to payments which they have made or will make to third parties in connection with the matter they are dealing with on behalf of the client. Section 67 of the Solicitors Act 1974 refers to disbursements as "costs payable in discharge of a liability properly incurred by [the solicitor] on behalf of the party to be charged with the bill". These may include court fees, counsel's fees, fees for medical or other expert reports or search fees in a property transaction.

Disbursements paid by an undertaker on behalf of a bereaved family generally include cemetery or crematorium costs, costs for religious worship and any newspaper announcements.

For VAT purposes, disbursements are defined more narrowly and distinguished from recharges like travelling expenses and postage, which are incurred by the business for its own requirements rather than for the customer. VAT is applied to recharges, but not to disbursements.
