= Forward-basing =

Military policy

Forward-basing, also known as forward deployment and forward presence, is a practice used by some militaries to establish an enduring presence in a foreign country as a means of power projection and furthering national interests.

Forward-based personnel, equipment and facilities can be used to carry out a variety of tasks, including expeditionary warfare, deterrence, logistical support, joint training and intelligence gathering. In addition to these strategic benefits, forward-based units have the tactical benefit of being able to respond to threats quicker due to their closer proximity. Aside from these advantages, forward basing also has its risks. Forward basing is reliant on access agreements with the host nation but politics risks this permission being revoked at any time. They also face operational risks due to their closer proximity to threats.

Throughout history, great powers such as the United States, United Kingdom, France and Russia have made extensive use of forward-basing to further their foreign policy objectives. The United States, for example, has a large number of military units forward-based in the Middle East to counter terrorism, as well as hostile state activity from Iran. Forward based units of the United States military operate from forward operating bases (FOBs) and main operating bases (MOBs).

The presence of forward based units can offer reassurance to allies which would otherwise be vulnerable. The NATO Enhanced Forward Presence (eFP) arrangement, for example, seeks to provide reassurance to Poland, Estonia, Latvia and Lithuania following Russia's annexation of Crimea.

== See also ==
- Military base
- List of countries with overseas military bases
- Military logistics
