= Command (military formation) =

Major and largest sub-formation within a military service branch

A command in military terminology is an organisational unit for which a military commander is responsible. Commands, sometimes called units or formations, form the building blocks of a military. A commander is normally specifically appointed to the role in order to provide a legal framework for the authority bestowed. Naval and military officers have legal authority by virtue of their officer's commission, but the specific responsibilities and privileges of command are derived from the publication of appointment.

The relevant definition of 'command' according to the United States Department of Defense (US DOD) is as follows:

(DOD) 3. A unit or units, an organization, or an area under the command of one individual. Also called CMD. See also area command; combatant command; combatant command (command authority).

== Major commands ==
Major commands are large formations used by the United States Department of Defense. Historically, a major command is the highest level of command. Within the United States Army, the acronym MACOM is used for major command. Within the United States Air Force (USAF), the acronym MAJCOM is used.

There are several types of DOD major commands:

- List of major commands of the United States Air Force
- List of major commands of the United States Army
- Naval Education and Training Command of the United States Navy
- Special operations commands such as Special Operations Command Europe
- Unified commands overseas such as Multinational Force Iraq; United States Forces Iraq or Combined Security Transition Command - Afghanistan

== See also ==
- Arctic Command
- Chain of command
- Command and control
- Military organization
- Tactical formation
- Unit cohesion
