= Area of responsibility =

Geographic region assigned to a military unit

Area of responsibility (AOR) is a pre-defined geographic region assigned to combatant commanders of the Unified Command Plan (UCP), that are used to define an area with specific geographic boundaries where they have the authority to plan and conduct operations; for which a force, or component commander bears a certain responsibility. The term may also be used in other countries worldwide but it originated within the United States Armed Forces. This system is designed to allow a single commander to exercise command and control of all military forces in the AOR, regardless of their branch of service.

George W. Bush signed the U.S. Unified Command Plan (UCP) 2008 on 17 December 2008, establishing the up-to-date boundaries for the newest Command, United States Africa Command (USAFRICOM), and all changes to boundaries of the other Commands.

U.S. Unified Command Plan (UCP) 2011 was signed on 6 April 2011. Boundaries were adjusted in the high northern latitudes between USEUCOM, USNORTHCOM and USPACOM.

Combatant commanders may designate theaters of war, theaters of operation, combat zones, and communications zones. Joint force commanders may define additional operational areas or joint areas to assist in the coordination and execution of joint warfare. The size of these areas and the types of forces used depend on the scope, nature, and projected duration of the operation.

Combatant commanders and other joint force commanders use the following organization of the battlespace at the operational level of war. Combatant commanders are assigned an area of responsibility in the Unified Command Plan.

- Theater of war, the area of aerial, terrestrial, and naval/littoral that is, or may become, directly involved in the manner of combat; either defined by the National Command Authority or a combatant commander, This area doesn't normally encompass the combatant commander's entire area of responsibility.
- Theater of operations, a sub-area within a theater of war defined by the force commander required to conduct or support specific operations. Different theaters of operations within the same theater of war will normally be geographically separate and focused on different enemy forces. Theaters of operations are usually of significant size, allowing for operations over extended periods of time.
- Combat zone, areas required by combat forces for the conduct of operations.
- Communication zone, the rear part of the theater of war or theater of operations (behind but contiguous to the combat zone) that contains lines of communications, establishments for supply or evacuation, and other agencies required for the immediate support and maintenance of the field forces. The Marine Corps component commander will normally focus efforts to deploy, support, and sustain forces, particularly the MAGTF, in the communications zone The commander will normally locate headquarters close to the joint force commander, who usually establishes headquarters in the communications zone.

Understanding the joint battlespace at the operational level of war in which forces will operate is an important step in setting the conditions for their success. Force commanders must understand the relationship between the Area of Operation (AO), Area of Interest, and Area of Influence.

By analyzing AO in terms of area of influence and area of interest, a force commander determines whether the assigned AO is appropriate. This analysis may include the forces' capabilities to conduct actions across the warfighting functions.

== Area of operation ==
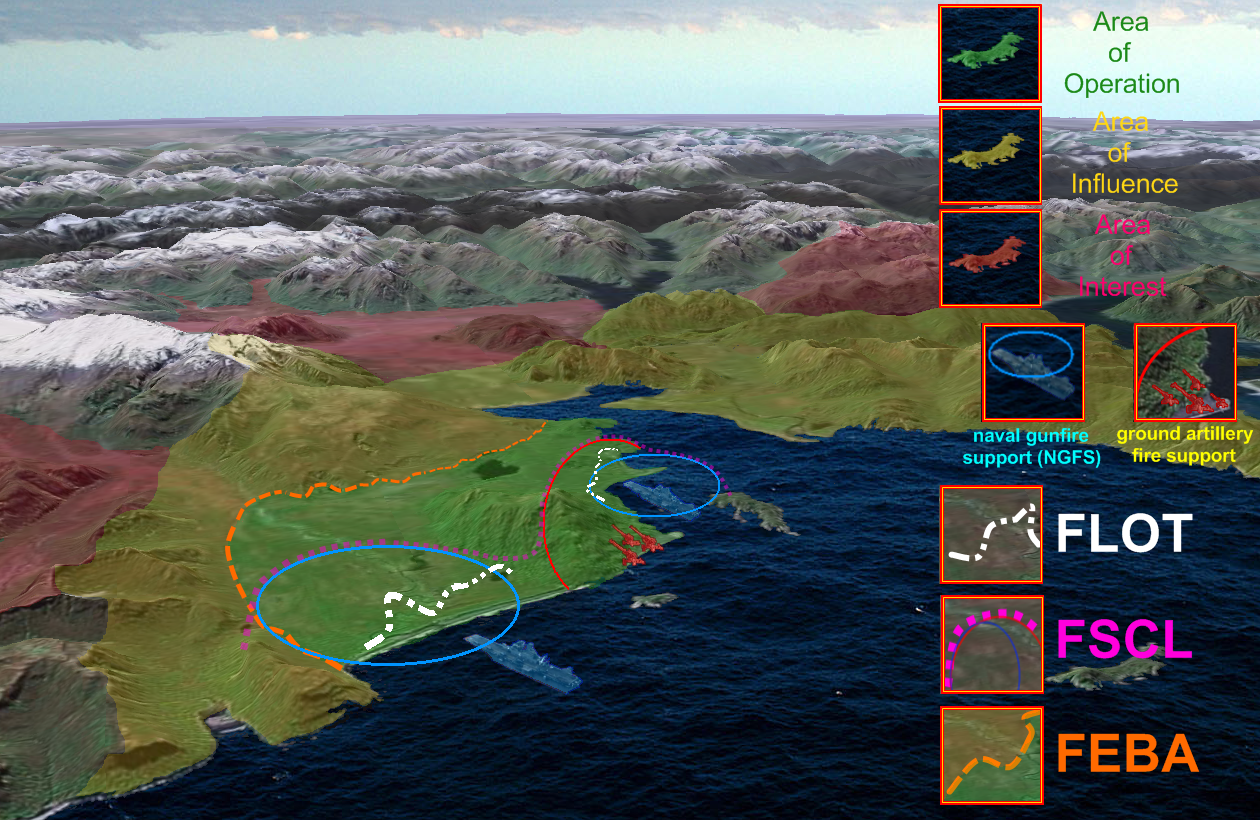
A diagram of the battlespace; contiguous is shown with relation to noncontiguous areas of responsibilities.

The Areas of Operation, or AOs, are areas that component and force commanders define as their tactical operability. It is also known as close battlespace. The commanders focus on establishing command and control in this area; which encompasses all aspects of fire support—naval gunfire, air and artillery superiority—in order to provide his ground forces the support they need. Also, the commander sets up force protection and supportive arms, such as logistics or reinforcements.

The term "area of operations" has long been used in the United States Army, for the geographic areas of interest to much smaller units than the combatant commands. It has especially been used among U.S. Army Special Forces.

The commander can choose to organize his AO so that his subordinates have contiguous or noncontiguous AOs:

- Contiguous AO—In a contiguous AO, all the subordinate commands' share one or more common boundary within supporting distance of one another in the battlespace. A commander may establish their battlespace in a reflection of linear operations, where there is a continuity and contiguous array of units across the area of operation (AO).
- Noncontiguous—A noncontiguous Area of Operation is one where one or more subordinate AOs do not share a common boundary. The commander establishes noncontiguous AOs when a more likely situation is one where the task force conducts non-linear operations within a noncontiguous battlespace and within an operational framework with noncontiguous deep, close, and rear areas.

Operation Restore Hope in Somalia during 1992–1993, is an example of a battlefield framework with noncontiguous areas. The United States' Marine Air-Ground Task Forces' (MAGTF) rear area was centered around the separate sites of the embassy compound, port, and airfield in the city of Mogadishu, while its close area was widely scattered around the towns and villages of the interior that were occupied by the MAGTF. The MAGTF's deep area included the rest of the country and particularly those population and relief centers not under the joint force commander's supervision.

== Areas of influence ==
In an area of influence, the component or force commander assigns subordinate units to conduct missions in and out of this area. Communication is key, either for reconnaissance to report intelligence or fire support for ground forces.

Sometimes known as distant battlespace, it is useful to the force commander as a tool in assigning subordinate areas of operations and in focusing intelligence collection and information operations to shape the battlespace to facilitate future operations. Today's area of influence may be tomorrow's AO.

== Area of interest ==
The key term area of interest specifies areas of interest to the component or force commander; the location of friendly and enemy forces, and the capabilities that may be an advantage, the infrastructure, and key terrain that concern the commander.

The size of the area of interest normally exceeds the commander's operational reach, which mainly focuses within the scope of deep operations.

While the area of interest includes the AO and area of influence, the area of interest may stretch far beyond the other parts of a commander's battlespace.

A commander may also have areas of interest around airbases in other countries neighboring the task force's AO.

== See also ==
- List of U.S. government and military acronyms
