= Ministry of Defence (Ukraine) =

Government ministry of Ukraine

Ministry of Defence of Ukraine
- Міністерство Oборони України
- Emblem of the ministry

- Flag of the Ministry of Defence

Ministry overview
- Formed: 24 September 1991
- Preceding Ministry: Committee of Military Affairs
- Jurisdiction: Government of Ukraine
- Headquarters: 6, Povitroflotskyi Ave., Kyiv
- Minister responsible: (Acting) Yevhenii Khmara, Minister of Defence
- Child agencies: Main Directorate of Intelligence; National Defence University of Ukraine
- Website: mil.gov.ua

The Ministry of Defence of Ukraine (Ukrainian: Міністерство оборони України, МОУ, romanized: Ministerstvo oborony Ukrainy, MOU) is the ministry of the Ukrainian government that oversees national defence and the Armed Forces of Ukraine. The head of the ministry is the Minister of Defence. The President of Ukraine is the Supreme Commander-in-Chief of the Armed Forces of Ukraine.

The ministry was established in Ukraine on 24 September 1991, one month after Ukraine's declaration of independence resolution. The ministry was put in charge of all Soviet military forces reorganization on the territory of Ukrainian jurisdiction. In 1994, Ukraine voluntarily gave up all nuclear weapons. The ministry spent significant funds eliminating nuclear weapons, military bases and equipment to meet Treaty on Conventional Armed Forces in Europe requirements.

In 2022 it was planned to provide 5% of Ukraine's GDP for the needs of the Ministry of Defence. In July 2022, amidst Russian invasion of Ukraine, the Ministry of Defence of Ukraine stated that it spends a years' budget of the ministry every month of the war with Russia.

== Mission ==
As ratified by the Verkhovna Rada (Ukrainian parliament), the major objectives of the ministry are preventing hostility, structuring the military, and repelling all types of aggression (both in country and internationally). Ukrainian security policies are based on non-intervention, respect for the national borders and sovereignty of other states, rejecting any use of force as an instrument of influence.

Because of political sensitivity, the military doctrine, similar to Ukraine's security policy, does not point out a specific threats. It rather refers to a "states, whose consistent policy presents a military threat, or leads to interference in the internal affairs of Ukraine, or encroaches Ukraine's territorial integrity and national interests."

Hence, the Ministry of Defence is responsible for:

- Support to Armed Forces day-to-day activities
- Mission and mobilization readiness
- Combatant value
- Training to fulfil assigned missions and engagement
- Manning and appropriate training
- Weapons and military equipment supplies
- Material, funding and other resources in accordance with requirements
- Control over the effective use of these resources
- Developing interoperability with executive power, civilian agencies and civilians
- International military and military-technical cooperation
- Control over compliance of Armed Forces activities with the Law
- Developing conditions for civilian control over Armed Forces.

== History ==
=== Early 20th century ===
The first military executive office was created on 28 June 1917, as part of the General Secretariat of Ukraine and was headed by Symon Petliura. It was created based on the Ukrainian General Military Committee under the auspices of the Central Council of Ukraine. The Russian Provisional Government refused to recognize it, but after the October Revolution the Secretariat of Military Affairs was re-established on 12 November 1917. At the end of December 1917, Symon Petliura resigned in protest at the Treaty of Brest-Litovsk.

At the same time, Bolsheviks established their own executive branch as part of the People's Secretariat headed by Vasyl Shakhrai. On 6 January 1918, Volodymyr Vynnychenko appointed Mykola Porsh to the vacant position. On 25 January 1918, the general secretariats were reorganized into people's ministries as Ukraine proclaimed its independence. The [People's] Ministry of Military Affairs existed also during the regime of Hetman of Ukraine Pavlo Skoropadsky and until the exile of the Ukrainian National Government at the end of 1920.

On 24 January 1919, the People's Commissariat of Military Affairs of the Ukrainian SSR was established. It was dissolved in the summer of 1919 due to the military union that was signed between the governments of the Ukrainian SSR and the Russian SFSR in April 1919.

In 1944, there also existed the People's Commissariat of Defence of the Ukrainian SSR.

=== Post-Soviet Union ===
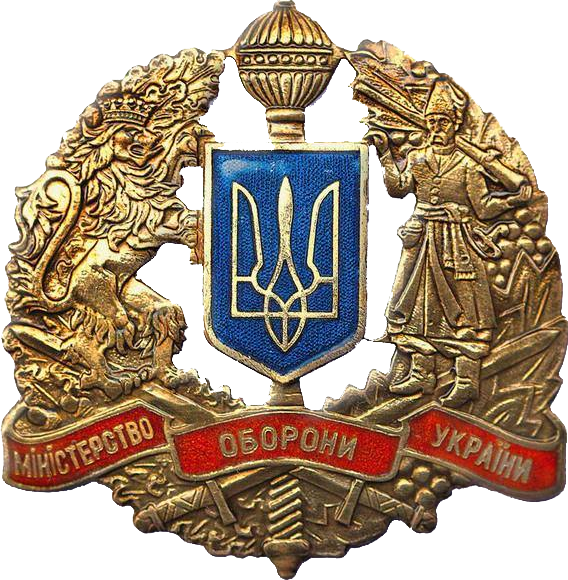
Insignia of the Ministry of Defence

Service patch of the Ministry of Defence

In 1991, Ukraine inherited one of the largest military forces, not only in the post-communist area, but in all of Europe (excluding Russia). This included 780,000 formerly Soviet military personnel, one rocket army, four Air Force armies, a separate air defence army, and the Black Sea Fleet. Altogether, when established, the Armed Forces of Ukraine included more than 350 ships, 1500 combat aircraft, and 1272 strategic nuclear war-heads of intercontinental ballistic missiles. This force was designed to confront NATO in full-scale warfare, using conventional and nuclear weapons.

On 24 September 1991, Verkhovna Rada of Ukraine adopted the resolution about the process of taking under its jurisdiction all military units of former Soviet Armed Forces situated on the territory of Ukraine, and about the establishment of the Ministry of Defence. Hence, the country became the first among the former Soviet republics to establish a ministry of defence. The ministry and the Ukrainian government subsequently began establishing the different military branches of Ukraine.

The political preference of Ukraine authority on the non-nuclear and non-coalition state status was made to be the foundation of the Armed Forces organization process. But equally important to the foundation were the limitations connected with approval of the Agreement "On conventional Armed Forces in Europe" and implementation of the Tashkent Agreement of 1992, which establish not only maximal levels of arms for each state of the former USSR. Therefore, between 1992 and 1997 the number of military personnel in Ukraine was nearly halved.

In a short span of time, Verkhovna Rada of Ukraine passed some legislative acts concerning the military sphere: The conception for Defence and organization of the Armed Forces of Ukraine, the resolution "On Security Council of Ukraine", Laws of Ukraine "On Defence of Ukraine", "On the Armed Forces of Ukraine", and Military Doctrine of Ukraine. Mostly related to structural control of the Armed Forces.

In addition, Ukraine began its nuclear weapons disarmament program in the early 1990s. By 1 June 1996, there were no nuclear weapons in Ukraine.

During the first few years of independence, the Defence Ministry built the basics for a functional defence system in spite of the difficulties of that time, which included hyperinflation, a transition from a socialist to a capitalist economic system and the loss of 60% of Ukraine's GDP. The Ministry of Defence, the General Staff, the branches of the Armed Forces, the executive system and a training system of the Armed Forces were established in this period. After some time, it became apparent that the process of the Armed Forces improvement had just begun. The problem was that not only there were no special system and efficient plan for resolving the military development problems of that time, but also that it was lack of trained personnel for its development and realization.

A shuffle in the military department's administration had a rather negative effect on the process of military development. From 1991 to 1996, three Ministers of Defence and four Chiefs of General Staff were changed. About 70% of administrative staff was changed in the early stages of forming the Armed Forces of Ukraine. All military district commanders, army commanders, corps and division commanders were changed several times over.

This problem was complicated by Ukraine's instability, connected with international dislocation of military personnel. About 12,000 officers pledged their allegiance to other countries (mostly Russia) and more than 33,000 personnel came back to serve the Ukrainian army between 1991 and 1994.

No doubt, that the main reason of dissatisfied realization of the main procedures of the Armed Forces development process was permanent reduction of common part of expenses for National Defence at all; expenses for the Armed Forces, purchases of armament and military vehicles, providing the research engineering and design efforts.

In 2016, Ukrainian defence minister Stepan Poltorak initiated a reform of the Ministry of Defence processes assisted by a group of advisers from the U.S., Canada, Poland, Lithuania and the United Kingdom, named "The Quint". In addition, several Western countries launched a training program to support the Armed Forces of Ukraine, such as the British Operation Orbital and the Canadian Operation Unifier.

On 15 February 2022, the Ukrainian Ministry of Defence said in a tweet that its website was temporarily brought down, likely as a result of a distributed denial-of-service attack. The attacks were part of the 2022 Ukraine cyberattacks amidst the prelude to the Russian invasion of Ukraine, for which Ukraine's Centre for Strategic Communications and Information Security suggested Russia was responsible.

== Structure ==
The Ukrainian Defence Ministry is responsible for the management of territorial defence, military development, mobilization in the case of war and combat readiness. The General Staff of Ukraine has the task of planning defensive and operational management of the armed forces. The General Staff is subordinate to the Defence Minister of Ukraine.

Since 1 January 2019 the Minister of Defence must be a civilian.

On 17 July 2025 the Ukrainian parliament passed a law to merge the Ministry of Strategic Industries of Ukraine (established in 2020) with the Ministry of Defence.

On 30 March 2025, the Ministry of Defence announced the establishment of the Space Policy Directorate.

Structures directly subordinated to the Ministry of Defence:

- Main Intelligence Directorate
- Security Service of the MoD
- Main Inspection
- Defence Policies Directorate
- Defence Information Policies and Strategic Communications Directorate
- Military Education and Science Department
- Military Technical Policies, Development and Military Weaponry and Equipment Department
- Internal Audit department
- Military Policies and Strategic Planning Department
- State Purchases and Deliveries of Material Resources Department
- Information Organisation Works and Control Department
- Personnel Policies Department
- International Defence Co-operation Department
- Social and Personnel Policies Support Department
- Financial Department
- Judicial Support Department
- Military Representations Directorate
- Anti-Corruption Directorate
- State Secrets Security Directorate
- Press and Information Directorate
- Physical Culture and Sport Directorate
  - Central Sports Club of the Armed Forces of Ukraine
- Control Measures Coordination Unit
- Mobilization Preparedness Unit
- State Aviation Scientific Development Institute, Kyiv
- State Scientific Test Center of the AFU (MU А4444), Honcharivsk, Chernihiv Oblast
- Central Scientific Research Institute of the AFU (MU А0202), Kyiv
- Central Military Weaponry and Equipment Scientific Research Institute of the AFU (MU А4566), Kyiv
- Scientific Research Center of the Missile and Artillery Troops (MU А????), Sumy, Sumy Oblast
- Scientific Research Center for Humanitarian Matters of the AFU (MU А2350), Kyiv
- Central Directorate for Acquisition and Delivery of Material Supplies of the AFU, Kyiv
- Codification Bureau (MU А2387), Kyiv
- Military Delegations of the MoU
