= MJC =

MJC is a short form which may refer to:

- Macau Jockey Club, in Macau, China
- Manila Jockey Club, in Carmona, Philippines
- Modesto Junior College, in Modesto, California, USA
- Meridian Junior College, in Singapore
- Muslim Judicial Council, in South Africa
- An abbreviation of Military Junior College
- Multinational Joint Commission, a Western effort to help Ukraine
