= Basle (disambiguation) =

Basle is an alternative name for the city of Basel, Switzerland.

Basle may also refer to:

- Basle, 1969, a 1996 jazz album

== People with the surname ==
- Charles Basle (1885–1962), American auto racer

== See also ==
- Basel III
- Basel (disambiguation)
