= Operation Orbital =

British training mission in Ukraine

- Part of the Russo-Ukrainian War
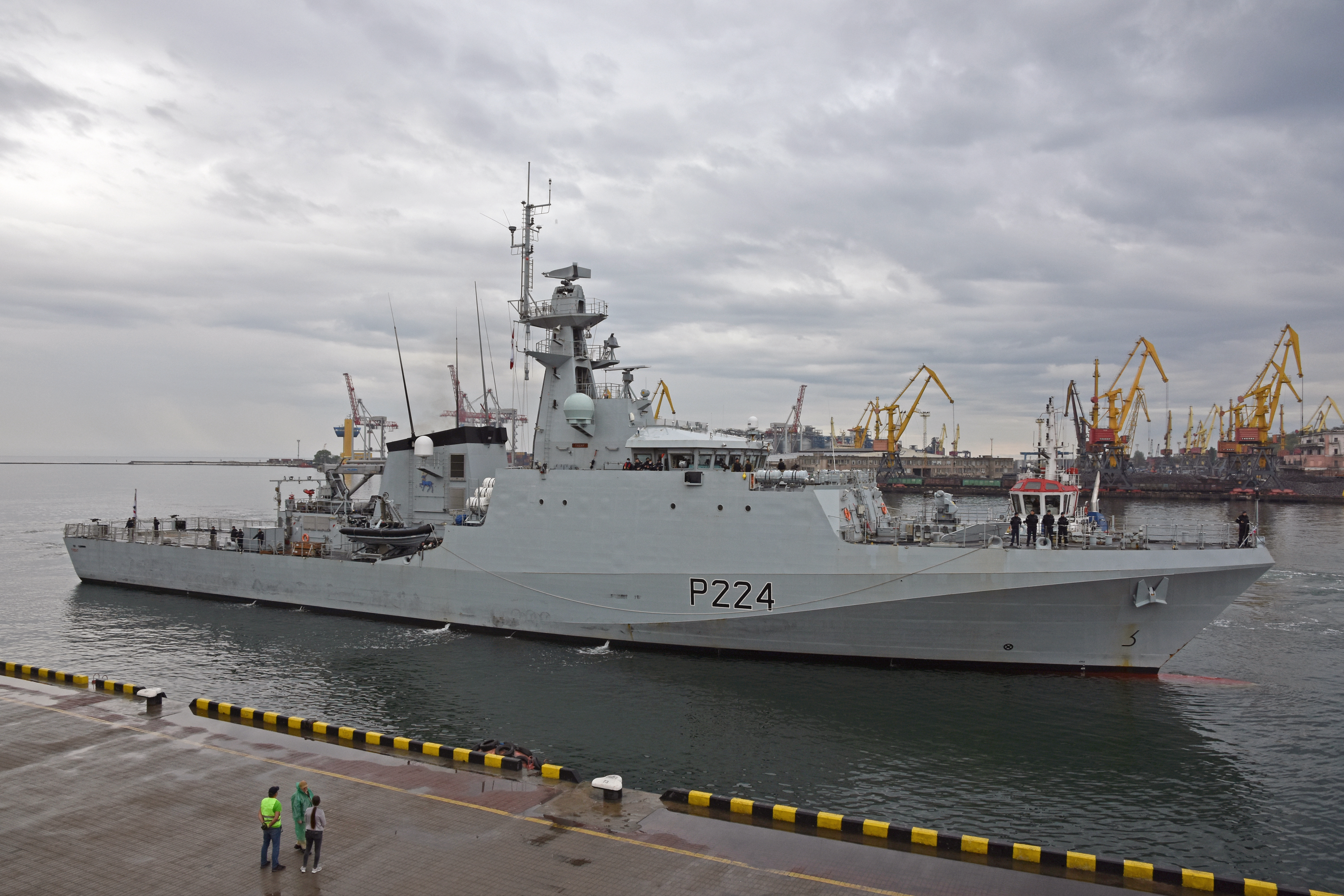
- Royal Navy off-shore patrol vessel HMS Trent arriving in Odesa to deliver a maritime training package (May 2021)
- Location: Ukraine
- Objective: Provide training and support to the Armed Forces of Ukraine to help ensure Ukraine's territorial integrity.
- Date: 24 February 2015 – 17 February 2022
- Executed by: United Kingdom
- Outcome: Training provided to 22,000 Ukrainian military personnel; Training suspended ahead of the Russian invasion of Ukraine; Launch of Operation Interflex

Operation Orbital was the code-name for a British military operation to train and support the Armed Forces of Ukraine. It was launched in 2015 in response to the 2014 Russian annexation of Crimea. It provided training to over 22,000 Ukrainian military personnel before it was suspended ahead of the Russian invasion of Ukraine. A successor, Operation Interflex, which involves a larger, British-led multinational training programme, was launched in the United Kingdom soon after.

== Background ==
In 2014, protests and a revolution broke out in Ukraine following the Ukrainian government's decision to foster closer ties to Russia, as opposed to the European Union. This unrest resulted in the removal of the pro-Russian President Viktor Yanukovych and the installation of a new pro-Western government led by Petro Poroshenko. In response to this, pro-Russian counter demonstrations took place in parts of Ukraine, mainly within the Donetsk and Luhansk (Donbas) regions in the country's east and within the Crimean Peninsula. Russia began supporting pro-Russian separatists in their conflict against Ukraine, which ignited a Russo-Ukrainian War. Between February and March 2014, Russia also invaded and annexed Crimea. This action was condemned by Ukraine, the UK, the EU, NATO and the US as a violation of international law. The UK coordinated with its Western allies to impose economic sanctions against Russia.

== History ==
In February 2015, Prime Minister David Cameron announced that the UK was deploying 30 troops to Ukraine to help train the Ukrainian military in medical, logistical, intelligence and infantry skills. This preceded a larger programme of training provided by up to 75 troops. These troops were rotated every two months, with command and control rotating every six months. The aim of this training mission, under the code-name Operation Orbital, was to increase the capacity of the Ukrainian military to help it better defend Ukraine's territorial integrity. It ran concurrently with training missions of other countries which were part of the Joint Multinational Training Group — Ukraine (JMTG-U).

The UK's training mission took place away from the conflict zones of the east and involved around 100 UK military personnel at a time, primarily from the British Army, working as Short Term Training Teams (STTTs). These teams were coordinated and led by HQ staff based in the Ukrainian capital Kyiv. Training focused on infantry, medical, logistical, counter-IED, leadership, planning and maritime (diving, firefighting, damage control and sea surveillance) skills.

In 2018, the UK expanded the scope of Operation Orbital to include maritime training provided by teams of Royal Navy and Royal Marines personnel. During the same year, members of 3rd Battalion, The Rifles (3 RIFLES) were among those involved with providing training.

In November 2019, the Ministry of Defence announced it had trained approximately 17,500 Ukrainian military personnel. It also announced a three-year extension to the operation.

The operation was temporarily suspended during the COVID-19 pandemic which began in 2019. This suspension was lifted by August 2020. In September 2020, Defence Secretary Ben Wallace announced that the UK was expanding its support to include a maritime training initiative, which saw Royal Navy personnel providing maritime training and support to Ukraine, alongside naval personnel from Sweden, Canada and Denmark.

To further support the aims of Operation Orbital, the UK and Ukraine reinforced their ties through joint training opportunities on land, sea and in the air. One of these training exercises — Exercise Joint Endeavour — involved the UK airdropping 250 paratroopers from the British Army's 16 Air Assault Brigade into Ukraine. They were flown directly from the UK within three days in the UK's largest parachute drop in over a decade. Ukrainian paratroopers from the Ukrainian 80th Air Assault Brigade took part in the exercise.

In October 2021, personnel from the RAF Regiment and RAF Police deployed to assist with air-focused force protection training.

=== Suspension ===
In February 2022, amid a build-up of Russian forces on the Russo-Ukrainian border and concerns of an impending Russian invasion, the UK began supplying Ukraine with anti-tank weapons, including NLAW missiles. Teams of UK military personnel were deployed to provide training on how to use the weapons, within the framework of Operation Orbital. Some 2,000 missiles were airlifted to the country by the Royal Air Force using C-17 Globemaster III transport aircraft. RAF surveillance aircraft, including Boeing RC-135, were also involved with collecting intelligence on Russian ground movements.

On 17 February 2022, the UK announced it had ended its training operation due to concerns of a "no notice" attack by Russia. Ukraine is not a member of NATO and, as such, the UK, along with other NATO member states, announced it would not defend it against Russia in a direct combat role. The UK helped reinforce NATO's eastern flank by doubling its presence in Estonia, and by dispatching ships to the Mediterranean and additional jets to RAF Akrotiri in Cyprus. Around 1,000 troops were also placed on standby in case they were needed to assist with refugees in Poland.

By its end, the operation had successfully provided training to 22,000 Ukrainian military personnel.

In May 2022, British Defence Secretary Ben Wallace stated that the operation was only temporarily "paused" and may resume once the war is over.

== Legacy and continued support ==
The UK relocated its training efforts to the United Kingdom on 9 July 2022, under Operation Interflex. The initial aim of this operation was to train up to 10,000 Ukrainians every 120 days, however due to an increasing number of instructors provided by international partners, this aim is likely to increase.

In addition to its training programmes, the UK has provided support to Ukraine in the form of military and humanitarian aid. It was the first European country to provide lethal military aid and its donations include armoured vehicles, anti-tank weapons, anti-air weapons and artillery. According to the Kiel Institute for the World Economy, the UK is the world's second largest donor of military aid to Ukraine.

According to the Royal United Services Institute (RUSI), British training and military aid has been consistently well-received with Ukrainian personnel routinely complimenting the professionalism and quality of instruction given by their British counterparts. On 19 March 2022, as Russia's invasion began to stall due to Ukrainian resistance, former Ukrainian President Petro Poroshenko praised UK instructors, stating: "I thank every British instructor who helped me to make Ukraine stronger. The ability to stop Putin is not only our achievement, this is an achievement for the British soldiers, officers who worked shoulder to shoulder with us to prepare Ukraine's armed forces. The result is impressive".

== See also ==
- United Kingdom-Ukraine relations
- Operation Unifier, parallel Canadian training mission
- Multinational Joint Commission
