= Basel (disambiguation) =

Basel is a city in Switzerland.

Basel may also refer to:

== People ==
- Alfred Basel (1876–1920), Austrian painter
- Edgar Basel (1930–1977), German boxer
- Marzia Basel (born 1968), Afghan judge
- Basel Abbas and Ruanne Abou-Rahme, art duo
- Basel Manadil (born 1993), popularly known as The Hungry Syrian Wanderer, Syrian-Filipino blogger

== Other uses ==
- Basel (canton), a historical Swiss canton, now divided into two half-cantons:
  - Basel-Landschaft
  - Basel-Stadt
- FC Basel, football (soccer) club based in Basel, Switzerland
- PS Basel, Indonesian football club based in Bangka Selatan (Basel), Bangka Belitung Islands
- Roman Catholic Diocese of Basel
- South Bangka Regency, a Indonesia province that often abbreviated as "Basel"
- Basel Committee on Banking Supervision (BCBS), an international banking regulatory body
  - Basel I, the first accord on banking capital, published in 1988
  - Basel II, the second accord on banking capital, published in 2004
  - Basel III, the third accord on banking capital, published in 2010
- Basel Convention, a treaty to reduce the movements of hazardous waste between nations
- Basel problem, a famous problem in number theory

== See also ==
- Basil, a plant and culinary herb
- Basil (name), of which Basel is a variant
- Basal (disambiguation), referring to a base or minimum level
- Basell Polyolefins
