= Podolia electoral district =

Constituency of the Russian Republic

Podolia
- Former Civilian constituency for the All-Russian Constituent Assembly
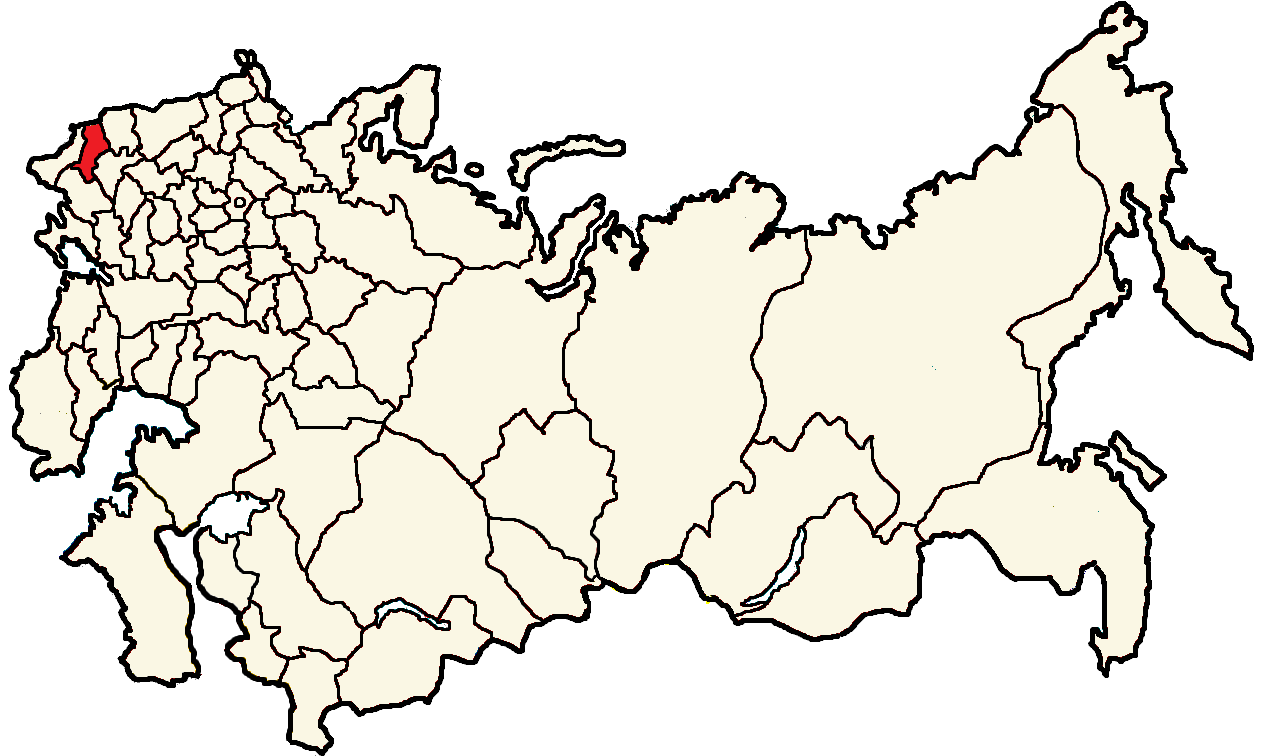

Former constituency
- Created: 1917
- Abolished: 1918
- Number of members: 19
- Number of Uyezd Electoral Commissions: 12
- Number of Urban Electoral Commissions: 1
- Number of Parishes: 163

The Podolia electoral district (Russian: Подольский избирательный округ) was a constituency created for the 1917 Russian Constituent Assembly election.

The electoral district covered the Podolian Governorate. Podolia was close to the frontline. U.S. historian Oliver Henry Radkey, whose work is one of the sources for the results table below, cites that the Ukrainian Social Democratic Labour Party organ Robitchna Gazeta reported that elections were held in Podolia between Dec 3-7, and presented results from 9 out of 12 uezds, but that Robitchna Gazeta's party tally greater than the vote cast in the 9 uezds, possibly pointing to results included from the remaining 3 uezds. The conservative Russkoe Slovo reported normal voting conditions in Podolia.

== Results ==
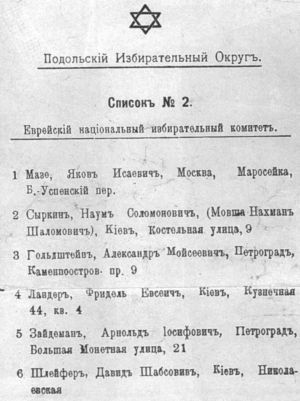
The ballot of List no. 2, the Jewish National Electoral Committee. The list was headed by Rabbi Yaakov Mazeh.

Podolia
| Party | Vote | % |
|---|---|---|
| List 1 - Ukrainian SRs, Selyanska Spilka and Ukrainian Soc.-Dem. Labour Party | 652,306 | 78.57 |
| List 2 - Jewish National Electoral Committee | 62,544 | 7.53 |
| List 8 - Regional Polish List | 46,500 | 5.60 |
| List 15 - Bolsheviks | 27,550 | 3.32 |
| List 10 - Socialist-Revolutionaries,Soviet of Peasants and Soviet of Soldiers of the South-Western Front | 10,170 | 1.22 |
| List 5 - Bund | 7,959 | 0.96 |
| List 4 - Kadets | 7,951 | 0.96 |
| List 14 - Mensheviks | 4,028 | 0.49 |
| List 12 - Ukrainian Toilers List | 3,810 | 0.46 |
| List 3 - United Jewish Socialist Labour Party (S.S. and E.S.) | 3,415 | 0.41 |
| List 7 - Poalei Zion | 2,164 | 0.26 |
| List 9 - Popular Socialists | 852 | 0.10 |
| List 16 - United Polish | 412 | 0.05 |
| List 6 - Jewish List | 322 | 0.04 |
| List 13 - Ushitsky Uezd List | 284 | 0.03 |
| List 11 - Zionists | - | |
| Total: | 830,267 | |

Deputies Elected
| Antonovych | Ukrainian Bloc |
| Blonski | Ukrainian Bloc |
| Dudich | Ukrainian Bloc |
| Dyachuk | Ukrainian Bloc |
| Gerasimenko | Ukrainian Bloc |
| Golovchuk | Ukrainian Bloc |
| Grigoriev | Ukrainian Bloc |
| Isaevich | Ukrainian Bloc |
| Litvitsky | Ukrainian Bloc |
| Liubynsky | Ukrainian Bloc |
| Machushenko | Ukrainian Bloc |
| Nikolaychuk | Ukrainian Bloc |
| Shevchenko | Ukrainian Bloc |
| Shimanovich | Ukrainian Bloc |
| Tkach | Ukrainian Bloc |
| Verkhola | Ukrainian Bloc |
| Widybida-Rudenko | Ukrainian Bloc |
| Bartoszewicz | Polish List |
