= Basal =

Basal or basilar is a term meaning base, bottom, or minimum.

== Science ==
- Basal (anatomy), an anatomical term of location for features associated with the base of an organism or structure
- Basal (medicine), a minimal level that is necessary for health or life, such as a minimum insulin dose
- Basal (phylogenetics), a relative position in a phylogenetic tree closer to the root

== Places ==
- Basal, Hungary, a village in Hungary
- Basal, Pakistan, a village in the Attock District

== Other ==
- Basal plate (disambiguation)
- Basal sliding, the act of a glacier sliding over the bed before it due to meltwater increasing the water pressure underneath the glacier causing it to be lifted from its bed
- Basal conglomerate, see conglomerate (geology)

== See also ==
- Basel (disambiguation)
- Basil (disambiguation)
