= Basal plate =

Basal plate may refer to:

- Basal plate (neural tube), the region of the neural tube ventral to the sulcus limitans
- Basal plate (placenta), between this plate and the uterine muscular fibres are the stratum spongiosum and the boundary layer
- The base of a plant's bulb
- The pedal disc, in anatomy of the sea anemone, the surface opposite to the mouth
- The region if electron density at which the central microtubule pair are nucleated in the eukaryotic flagellum axoneme

== See also ==
- Plate (anatomy), for other uses of the word "plate" in an anatomical context
- Plate (disambiguation)
- Basal (disambiguation)
