= Alfred Basel =

Austrian painter and etcher

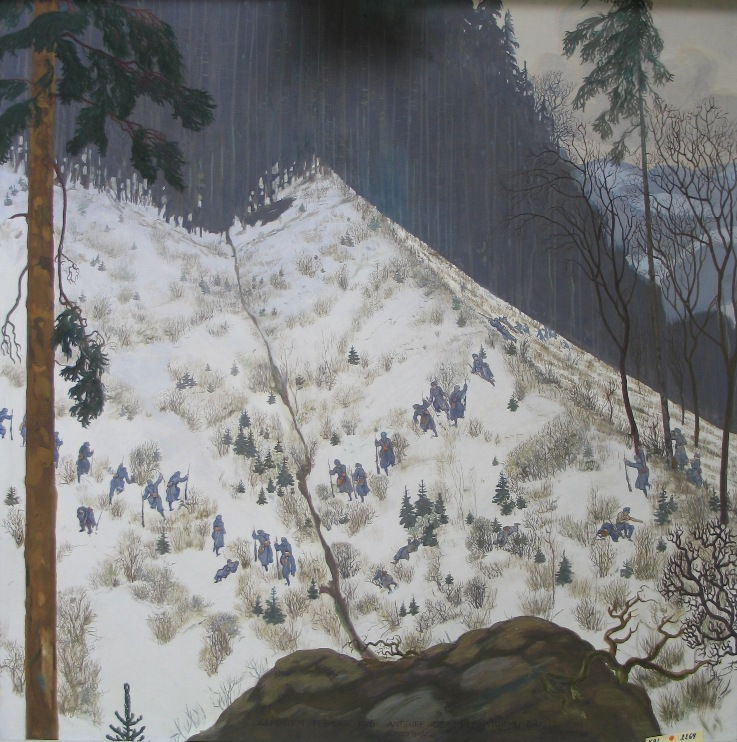
Kämpfe in den Karpaten (Fighting in the Carpathians). Tempera on canvas, 100.5 × 100.5 cm. Heeresgeschichtliches Museum, Vienna.

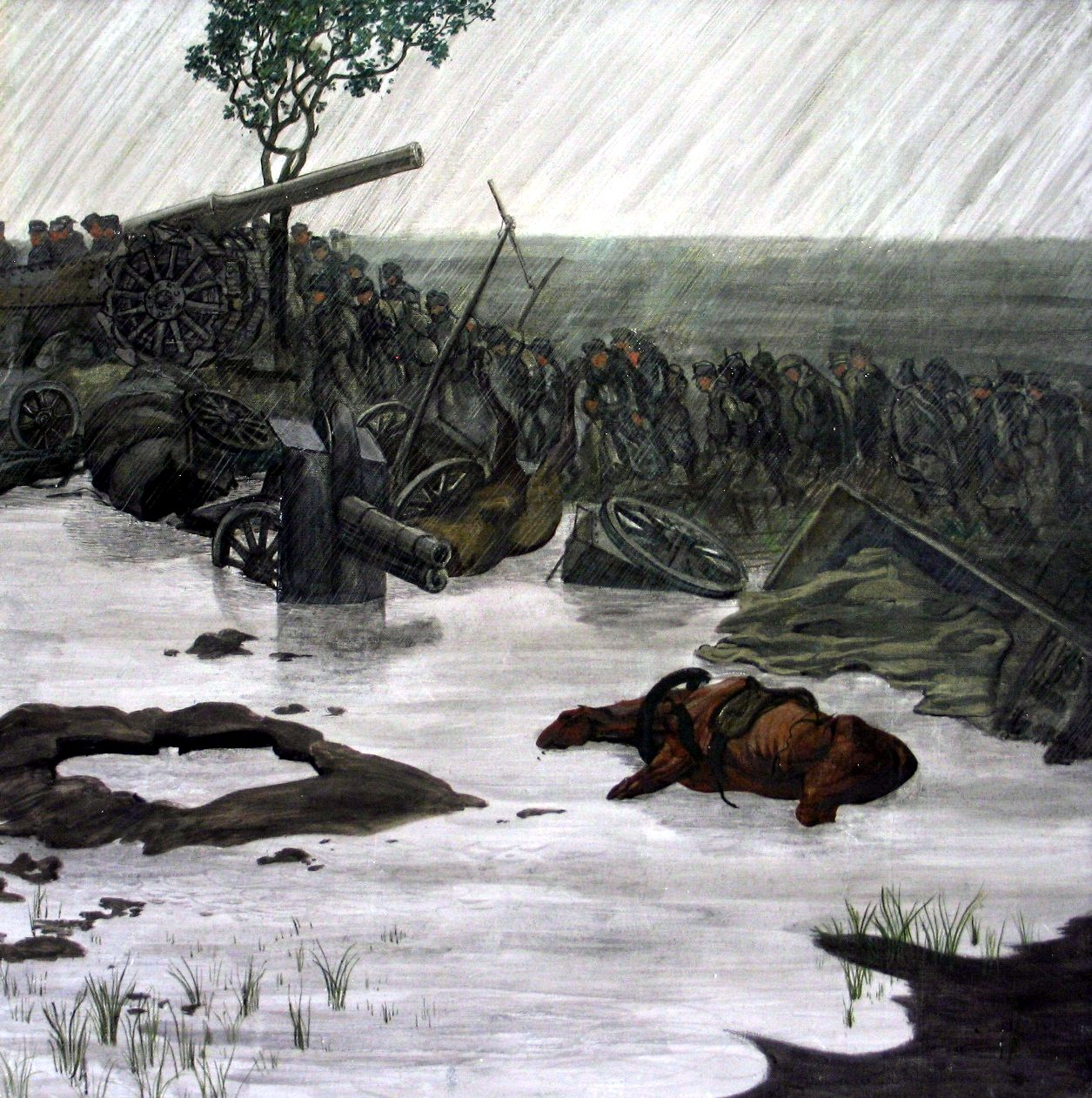
Nach dem Durchbruch am Tagliamento (After the Breakthrough at the Tagliamento). Oil on canvas, 100 × 100 cm. Heeresgeschichtliches Museum, Vienna.

Alfred Basel (23 March 1876 – 24 January 1920) was an Austrian painter and etcher.

Born in Vienna to a factory owner, Basel studied at the Wiener Kunstgewerbeschule under Felician von Myrbach between 1892 and 1898. He was a reserve officer during the First World War, serving with the rank of Oberleutnant in the Fourth Army on the Galician front from March 1915. In the fall he fell ill and was declared unfit for military service. By November he was a war artist serving the Kriegspressequartier. In 1916 he was on the Vistula, in the Carpathians, in Albania, on the Isonzo, and in Ukraine. It was his artistic breakthrough.

In 1919, at the winter exhibition of the Wiener Künstlerhaus, Basel exhibited his work outside of the Kriegspressequartier for the first time. His treatment of military events was careful and accurate, and both stylistically and biographically he has many similarities to Oskar Laske. Like him, Basel avoids sensationalising or exaggerating, and favours crowds of small figures and a simplicity approaching photographic accuracy.

Alfred died from the effects of a hunting accident in Dickenau, Türnitz, Lower Austria.
