= Ukraine during World War I =

Overview of Ukrainian involvement in World War I

Upon the outbreak of World War I, Ukraine was not an independent political entity or state. The majority of the territory that makes up the modern country of Ukraine was part of the Russian Empire with a notable far western region administered by the Austro-Hungarian Empire, and the border between them dating to the Congress of Vienna in 1815. Despite this, in the opinion of British historian Dominic Lieven, control over Ukrainian territory played a decisive role in the outcome of the conflict.

== Ukraine's role in the prelude to the war ==
Towards the latter 19th century, both the Russian and Austro-Hungarian Empires attempted to exert their influence on the adjacent territory on the tide of rising national awareness of the period as borders did not undermine the ethnic composition of Europe. The Russian Empire viewed Ukrainians as Little Russians and had the support of the large Russophile community among the Ukrainian and Ruthenians population in Galicia. Austria, on the contrary, supported the late-19th century rise in Ukrainian Nationalism. Western Ukraine was a major standoff for the Balkans and the Slavic Orthodox population it harboured.

A Balkan war between Austria-Hungary and Serbia was considered inevitable, as Austria-Hungary’s influence waned and the Pan-Slavic movement grew. The rise of ethnic nationalism coincided with the growth of Serbia, where anti-Austrian sentiment was perhaps most fervent. Austria-Hungary had occupied the former Ottoman province of Bosnia-Herzegovina, which had a large Serb population, in 1878. It was formally annexed by Austria-Hungary in 1908. Increasing nationalist sentiment also coincided with the decline of the Ottoman Empire. Russia supported the Pan-Slavic movement, motivated by ethnic and religious loyalties and a rivalry with Austria dating back to the Crimean War. Recent events such as the failed Russian-Austrian treaty and a century-old dream of a warm water port also motivated St. Petersburg.

Religion also played a key role in the standoff. When Russia and Austria partitioned Poland at the end of the 18th century, they inherited largely Eastern-rite Catholic populations. Russia went to great lengths to revert the population to Orthodoxy, at times forcibly (as took place in Chelm).

The final factor was that by 1914, Ukrainian nationalism had matured to a point where it could significantly influence the future of the region. By the time of the beginning of hostilities, Ukrainians had established their own political parties, civic organizations and press, issued demands for national autonomy. According to Ivan Rudnytsky, as a result of the rise of nationalist movements in the areas of Russo-Austrian confrontation, also including Polish and Romanian lands, both empires eventually lost these disputed territories, resulting in formation of new, independent states.

== Course of the war in Ukrainian lands ==
=== Outbreak ===
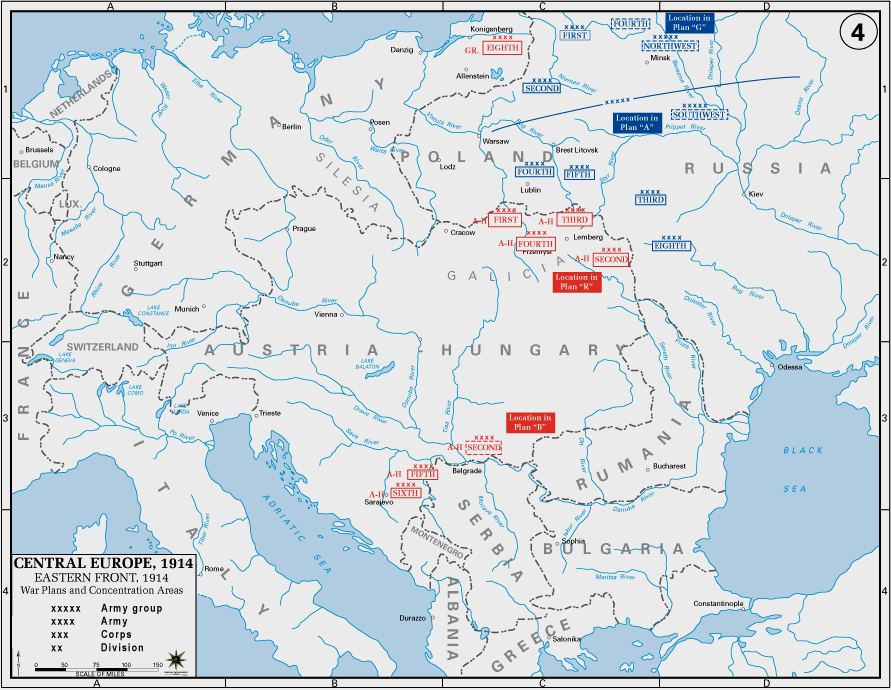
Eastern Front on the verge of conflict in 1914

The Russian advance into Galicia began in August 1914. During the offensive, the Russian army successfully pushed the Austrians right up to the Carpathian ridge effectively capturing all of the lowland territory, and fulfilling their long aspirations of annexing the territory.

Ukrainians were split into two separate and opposing armies. 3.5 million fought with the Imperial Russian Army, while 250,000 fought for the Austro-Hungarian Army. Many Ukrainians thus ended up fighting each other. Also, many Ukrainian civilians suffered as armies shot and killed them after accusing them of collaborating with opposing armies (see Thalerhof internment camp). All in all, around 500,000 Ukrainians died as a result of the war.

Ukrainian Sich Riflemen, the first ethnically Ukrainian military unit of the 20th century, fought on the side of Austro-Hungarian Army. Although its size was limited by Austrian authorities, over 9,000 servicemen joined its ranks during the years of war.

=== Effects on civilians ===
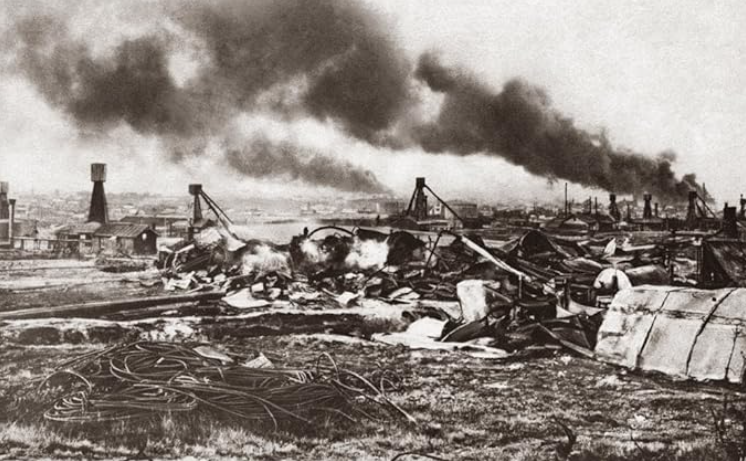
Oil wells set on fire by the Russian army in Boryslav, Galicia (now Ukraine)

During World War I Ukrainians found themselves between the armies of Austria-Hungary and Russia. Ukrainian villages were regularly destroyed in the crossfire. Ukrainians could be found participating on both sides of the conflict. In Galicia, over twenty thousand Ukrainians who were suspected of being sympathetic to Russian interests were arrested and placed in Austrian concentration camps in Talerhof, Styria and in Terezín fortress (now in the Czech Republic).

The retreat of Russian troops led to mass flight of civilian population from western territories of the Russian Empire. According to estimates, starting from summer 1915, around 3.5 million people fled the advance of German and Austro-Hungarian troops. As part of their policies, retreating Russian armies evacuated almost 200 firms and factories with their personnel, as well as archives and railway transport. The evacuation was accompanied by mass looting of property by Russian soldiers and purposed destruction of bridges, railways and aqueducts, as well as Catholic churches. Inhabitants of villages in frontline areas were ordered by authorities to destroy their crops and remove all grain, horses and cattle. Male inhabitants were forcibly evacuated, and the rest of the population was encouraged to leave as well by means of anti-German atrocity propaganda spread by soldiers and Orthodox clergy. In many cases Russian Cossack troops would loot and burn down entire villages, beating their inhabitants and forcing them to leave.

The relocation campaign was aimed chiefly at the Eastern Orthodox population, most of them Belarusians and Ukrainians. In some locations villagers would hide in forests to evade forced deportation by authorities. At the same time, most Catholic Poles stayed, hoping for the reinstatement of independent Polish statehood under German rule. Other groups of refugees included Jews, Tatars and Protestants. Mass flight of the population led to famine and spread of diseases, such as measles, typhus and cholera.

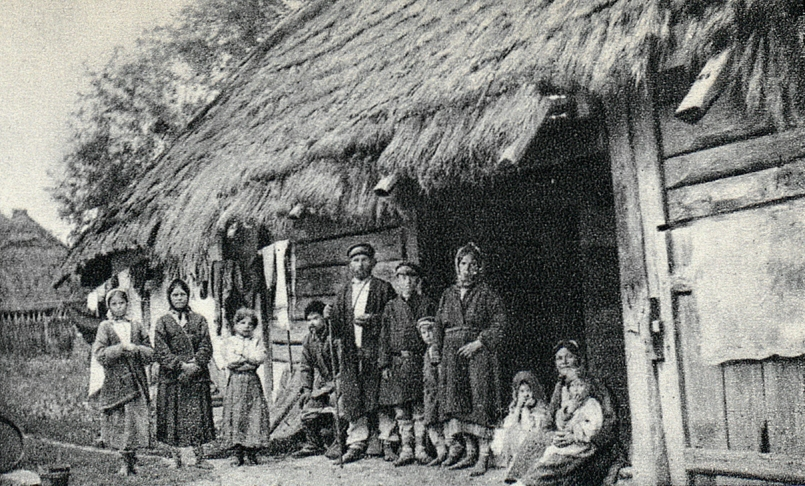
A peasant family in Volhynia during the war

In order to alleviate the situation of refugees, a committee headed by Grand Duchess Tatiana, the daughter of Emperor Nicholas II, was established. Separate relief committees were also established by national groups including Poles, Lithuanians and Latvians. They worked to support their displaced compatriots in different parts of the empire and organized publishing and schooling in their native languages. At the same time, Ruthenian (Ukrainian and Belarusian) refugees lacked national elites who could organize such activities, so their children were forced to visit Russian language schools and gradually assimilated.

Most of the refugees who had fled from the Eastern Front during the First World War were repatriated by the authorities of newly established Second Polish Republic in 1921–1924, after the end of the Russian Civil War. During that period 1.1 million people returned to their previous locations, 65% of them Ukrainians and Belarusians, 27% Poles and 7% Jews.

== Ukraine after the Russian Revolution of 1917 ==
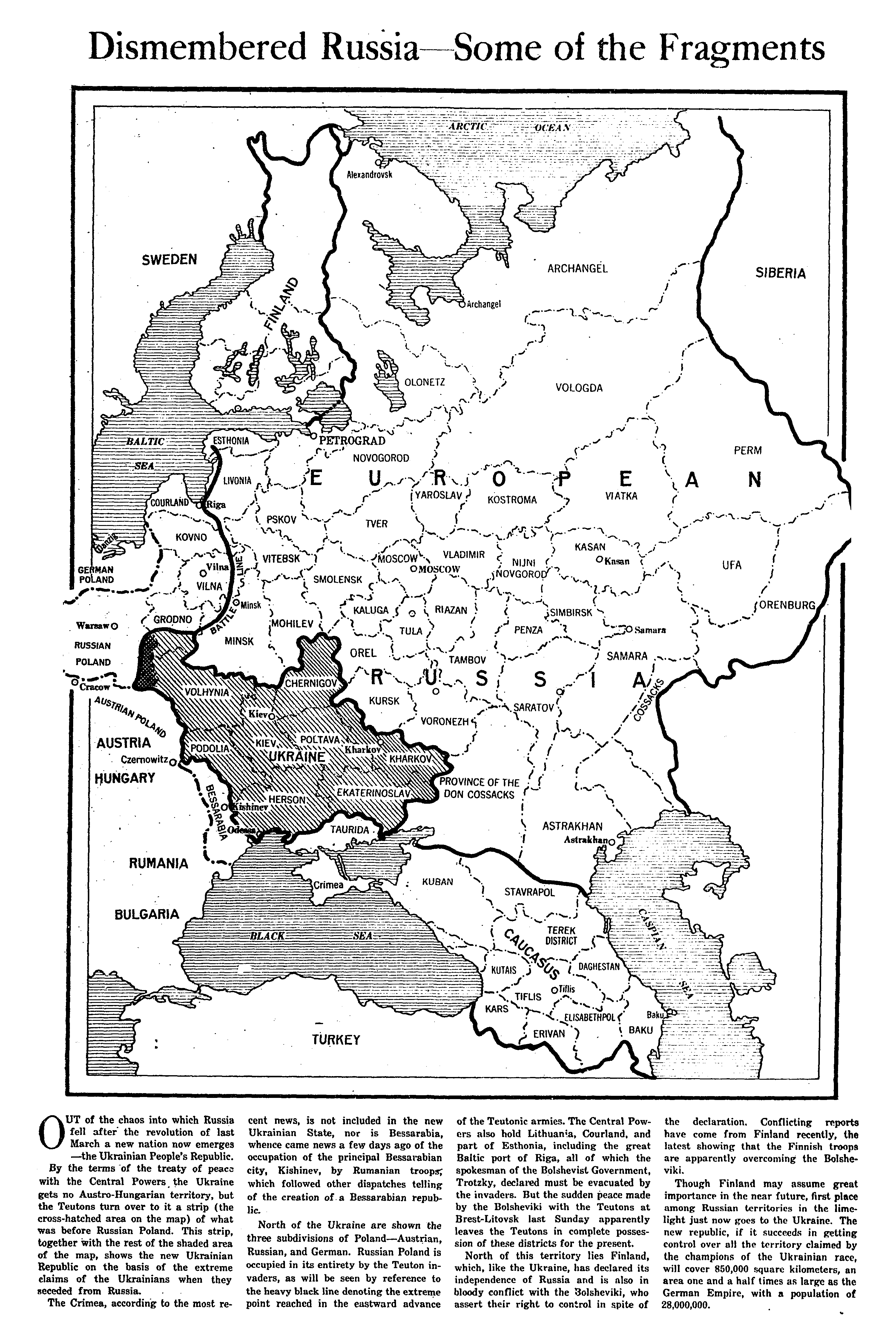
February 1918 article from The New York Times showing a map of the Russian Imperial territories claimed by Ukrainian People’s Republic at the time, before the annexation of the Austro-Hungarian lands of the West Ukrainian People's Republic

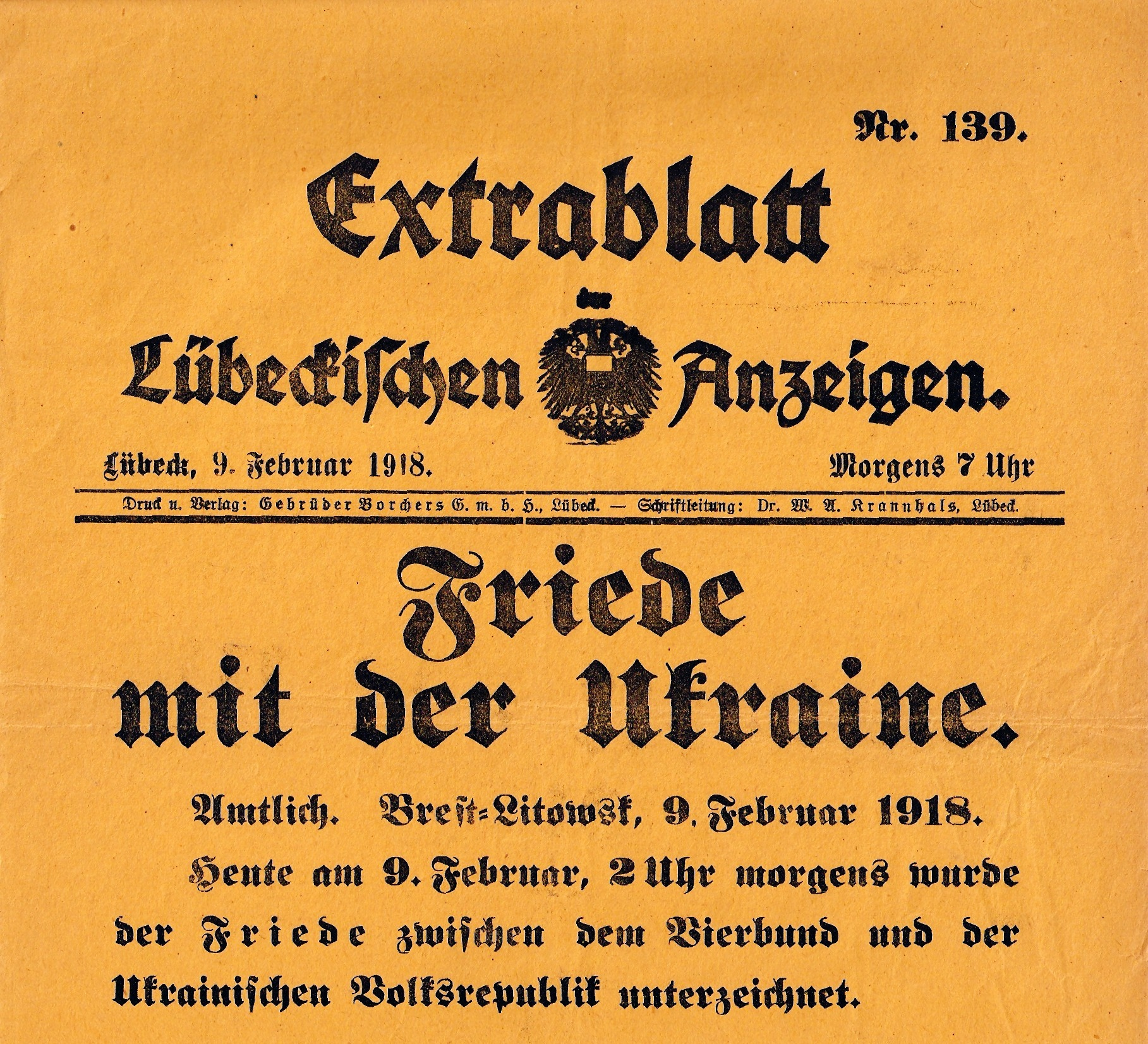
Special edition of the Lübeckischen Anzeigen, dedicated to the 9 February 1918 Treaty of Brest Litovsk signed between the Central Powers and Ukrainian People's Republic

Towards the end of the First World War, the fighting in Ukraine escalated further with the beginning of the Russian Revolution of 1917. Following the abdication of Nicholas II of Russia in March 1917, the Central Council of Ukraine was established in Kyiv. Following the Bolshevik capture of power in Petrograd, on 20 November the Central Council proclaimed the stablishment of Ukrainian People's Republic. The revolution began a civil war within the Russian Empire and much of the fighting took place in the Ukrainian provinces. Many atrocities occurred during the civil war as the Red, White, Polish, Ukrainian, and allied armies marched throughout the country.

In October 1918, the Ukrainian National Council was formed in Lviv, and after the dissolution of Austria-Hungary its loyal troops established a Ukrainian government in Eastern Galicia. However, neither Western Ukraine nor the Ukrainian People's Republic gained enough support in the international community. Due to the geographic and economic importance of Ukraine, its territory became a goal of foreign conquest. As a result, by 1921 both Ukrainian states had been defeated in a series of wars.

The 1919 Treaty of Versailles secured the borders of Ukrainian land after those of other European countries. In the West, Galicia and western Volhynia were left to Poland. The Kingdom of Romania gained the province of Bukovina. Czechoslovakia secured the former lands of Austria-Hungary, Uzhhorod and Mukachevo. The remaining central and eastern Ukrainian provinces were left to the Soviet Union, becoming part of the Ukrainian SSR. As a result of World War I and the Russian Civil War, Ukrainian nationalists looked on as their attempt to attain statehood crumbled in favor of other countries' territorial expansion, as 1.5 million had died in the recent fighting.

== See also ==
- Bibliography of Ukrainian history
- Outline of Ukrainian history
- Galician Protocol

== Sources ==
- Velychenko Stephen, "The Versailles Treaty and the Ukrainian National Republic. The American Refusal to recognize Ukrainian Independence in 1919."
