= Operation Interflex =

British training mission in Ukraine

- Part of the foreign involvement in the Russian invasion of Ukraine
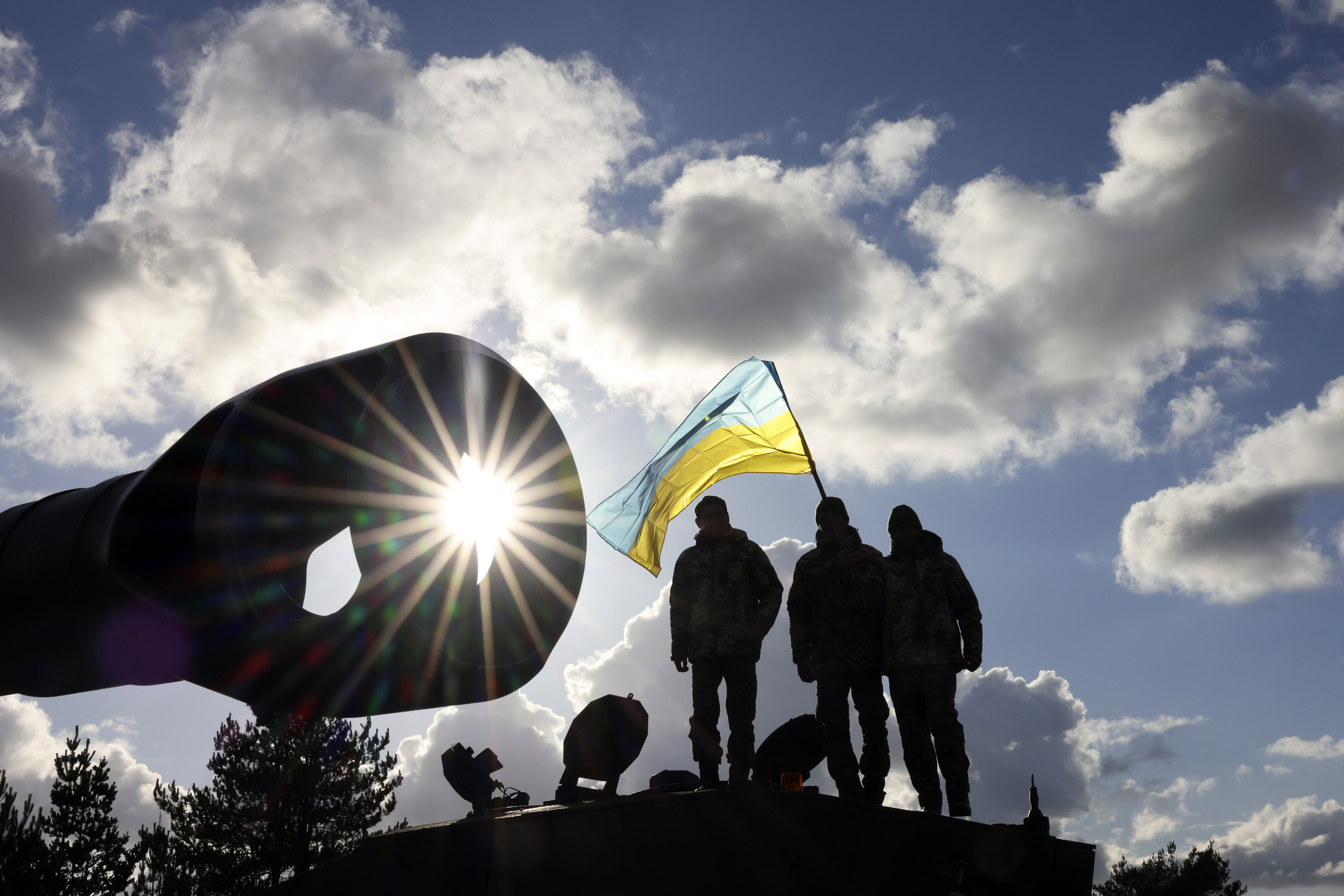
- Ukrainian recruits standing on a UK-supplied Challenger 2 main battle tank
- Location: United Kingdom
- Objective: Provide training and support to the Armed Forces of Ukraine to help ensure Ukraine's territorial integrity.
- Date: 9 July 2022–present
- Executed by: United Kingdom International Assistance: Albania; Australia; Canada; Denmark; Estonia; Finland; Germany; Kosovo; Latvia; Lithuania; Netherlands; New Zealand; Norway; Romania; Sweden
- Outcome: Ongoing

Operation Interflex is the operational code name for the British-led multinational military operation to train and support the Armed Forces of Ukraine. It is a successor to Operation Orbital (2015–2022) and began in July 2022. Unlike its predecessor, Operation Interflex takes place within the United Kingdom and is supported by contingents from international partners. It is still ongoing as of 2026.

== Background ==
Prior to the launch of Operation Interflex, the United Kingdom trained and supported the armed forces of Ukraine through Operation Orbital. This operation was launched in 2015 in response to the Russian annexation of Crimea. Based in Ukraine, British military instructors, primarily from the British Army, provided training on medical, logistical, intelligence and infantry skills with the ultimate goal of ensuring Ukraine's territorial integrity. The operation ran concurrently with similar efforts of international partners in the Joint Multinational Training Group — Ukraine (JMTG-U).

In February 2022, amid a buildup of Russian forces on the Ukrainian border, the UK supplied Ukraine with anti-tank weapons; training was provided for these as part of Operation Orbital. On 17 February 2022, the UK announced that Operation Orbital had been suspended due to fears of Russia launching a "no notice" attack. By its end, the operation had provided training to approximately 22,000 Ukrainian military personnel.

On 17 June 2022, during a visit to Kyiv, Prime Minister Boris Johnson offered Ukraine a new training programme, this time located within the UK, with the aim of training up to 10,000 Ukrainians every 120 days.

== History ==
=== 2022 ===
Operation Interflex began on 9 July 2022, led by the British Army's 11th Security Force Assistance Brigade. Approximately 1,050 British military personnel were placed on standby to assist with training, which is held at several sites across the UK. To assist with training, the UK government rapidly procured AK variant rifles, similar to those used by Ukrainian forces.

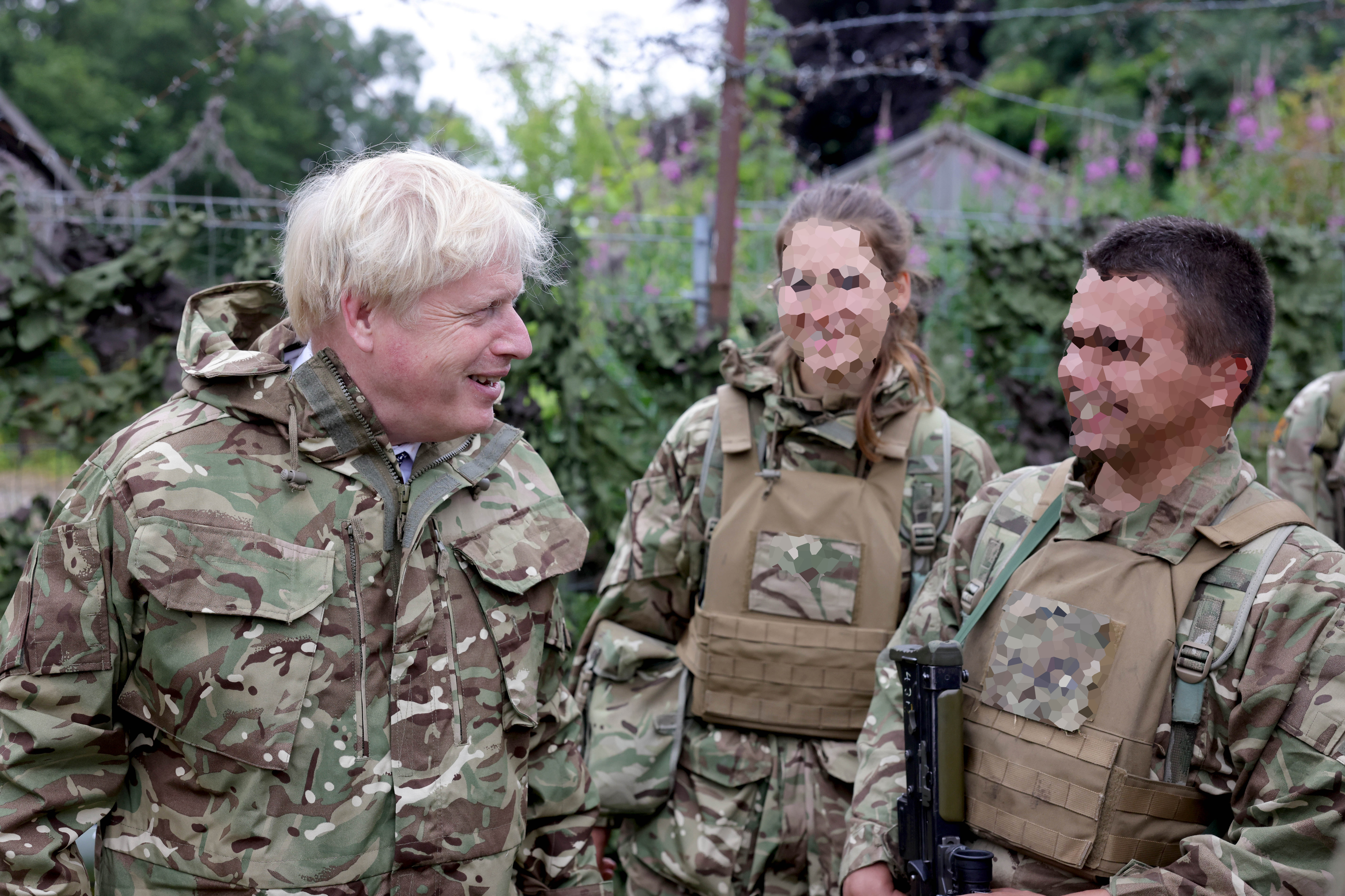
British Prime Minister Boris Johnson visits Ukrainian troops training in the North East of England in July 2022.

By 30 June 2022, approximately 450 Ukrainian troops had received training in the UK. This training reportedly focused on the use of UK-supplied weaponry, including M270 Multiple Launch Rocket Systems.

On 11 November 2022, it was reported that approximately 7,400 Ukrainian military personnel had completed training in the UK.

The training has received praise by the Ukrainian military; according to Brigadier Justin Stenhouse, who oversees the training programme, one Ukrainian commander informed him about a recent frontline incident where 10 Ukrainian soldiers came under Russian attack but stood firm and "took the fight to the Russians, while the others took cover". This inspired the rest of their platoon to join the fight and, after the Russians had been repelled, the commander asked them why they had done this, to which they replied: "This is what we were taught to do in UK training."

The Royal Navy is also contributing to the programme with Ukrainians being trained in maritime skills, such as damage control, minehunting and weapon drills. In October 2022, Russia accused British naval specialists of providing "guidance and leadership" to Ukraine in its attacks against Sevastopol Naval Base on 29 October.

=== 2023 ===
On 15 January 2023, the British government announced another package of military aid for Ukraine, which included 14 Challenger 2 main battle tanks. Ukrainians began arriving for training on the tanks in early February. During the same month, it was also announced that training would be expanded to marine infantry and fighter pilots. By 16 February 2023, British and international trainers had trained 10,000 Ukrainian recruits.

On 8 February 2023, President of Ukraine Volodymyr Zelenskyy visited Lulworth Camp along with British prime minister Rishi Sunak, where he met Ukrainian troops who were being trained to use Challenger 2 tanks.

By 5 July 2023, 18,000 Ukrainian service personnel had been trained under Operation Interflex.

In July 2023, the Royal Navy Diving and Threat Exploitation Group (DTXG) taught Ukrainian Navy divers and personnel who operate uncrewed underwater vehicles (UUVs) how to find and safely neutralise free-floating buoyant mines, ground mines and improvised explosive devices in, on, and around the water at Loch Ewe in Scotland.

By 30 September 2023, approximately 20,000 Ukrainian service personnel had received training. UK Defence Secretary Grant Shapps also disclosed that there were ongoing discussions on moving the British-led training programme "into Ukraine".

By November 2023, over 30,000 Ukrainians had received training.

=== 2024 ===
In February 2024 the BBC disclosed that the British army was training Ukrainian troops at secret camp in East Anglia.

In March 2024, the first Ukrainian pilots passed basic flight training, allowing them to progress onto advanced flight training in France.

By October 2024, 200 pilots had passed training.

In November 2024, the Defence Secretary announced that the number of Ukrainian recruits to have been trained as part of the UK-led operation had hit 50,000.

Also in November 2024, the Ministry of Defence said that more than a quarter of the British Army's training estate was being used for Operation Interflex, constraining the Army's capacity to train its own soldiers.

By November 2024, the British Army had begun providing training to Ukrainian soldiers on how to detect, identify, render safe and dispose of explosive landmines, following Joe Biden's decision to send anti-personnel landmines to Ukraine.

=== 2025 ===
In December 2025, the British government announced that a member of the Parachute Regiment, Lance Corporal George Hooley, died in Ukraine during a test of Ukrainian weapons which BBC News reported was said to be an armed interceptor drone. It is the first time a Parachute Regiment member had been confirmed in Ukraine; The i Paper reported he was working for the Special Forces Support Group.

=== 2026 ===
In May 2026 the Ukrainian Ministry of Defence requested more advanced and specialist training, rather than the earlier basic and leadership training emphasis. In response, INTERFLEX was undergoing transformation to focus on specialist skills such as operational tactics, medical expertise, engineering, and logistics training in the UK and abroad. The MOD noted that INTERFLEX had already trained over 11,000 Ukrainian instructors who now lead training independently in Ukraine.

== International assistance ==
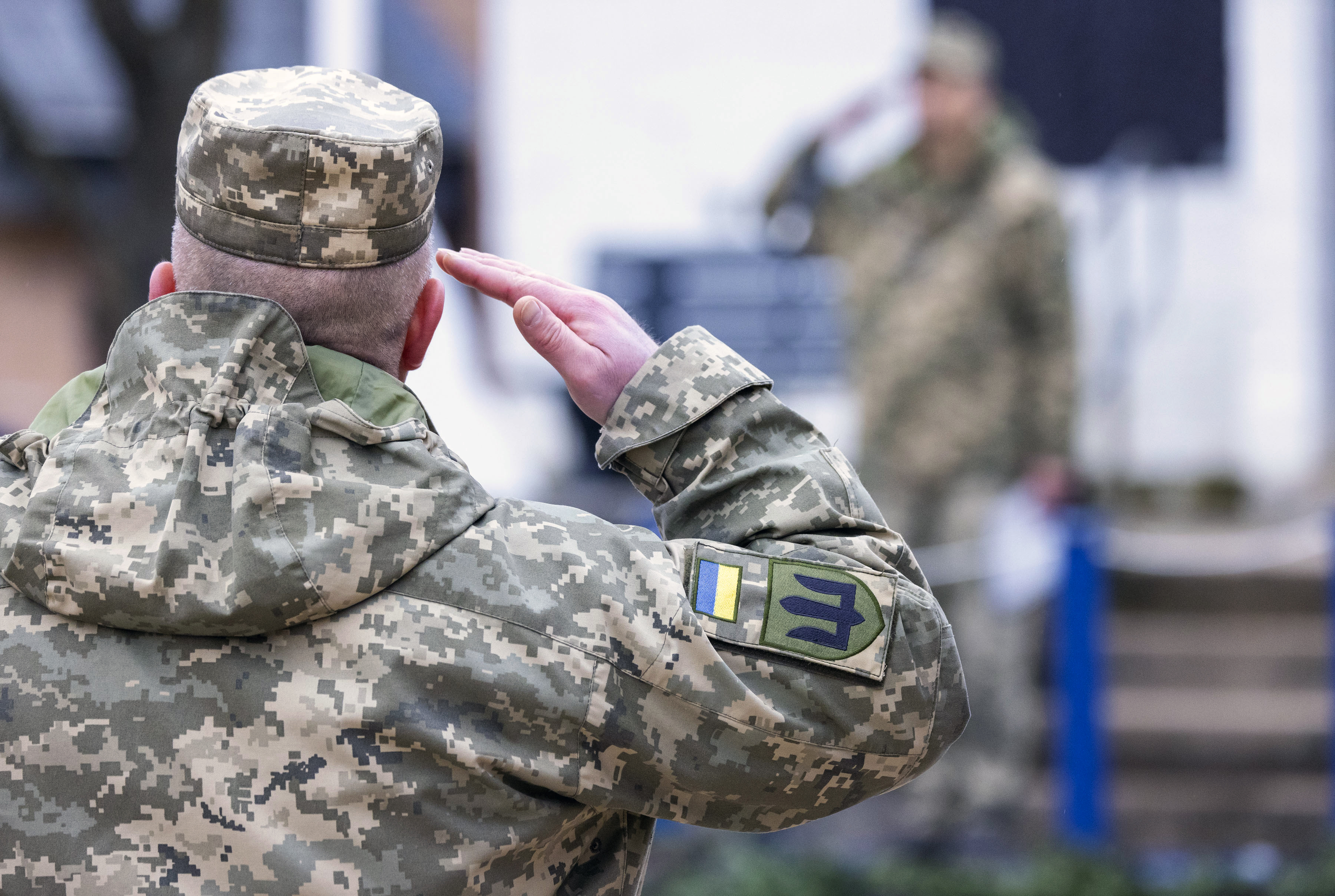
A Ukrainian serviceman deployed to the UK

On 4 August 2022, Canada joined New Zealand and the Netherlands in sending a contingent to assist with the UK-led training programme. Approximately 170 soldiers were sent to the UK under Operation UNIFIER, primarily from Princess Patricia's Canadian Light Infantry. The New Zealand contingent initially amounted to around 29 troops, with their instruction focusing on the L118 light gun, donated by both the UK and New Zealand. It was later announced, on 15 August, that this contingent would be expanded by a further 120 troops to deliver infantry training.

The UK invited the member states of the Joint Expeditionary Force to contribute to the training programme; on 7 August 2022, Sweden accepted its invitation and announced it would send 120 instructors. This was followed a day later by a commitment from Finland to send 20 instructors. On 10 August, Denmark further announced that it would join the training mission, sending 130 instructors. On 11 August, Germany, Latvia and Norway announced they would be joining the training programme. Due to this, the UK announced it would be possible to train more Ukrainians than initially planned. However, by November 2023, Germany had not sent any instructors and was excluded from a list of participating nations.

On 18 August, Estonia announced joining the training mission. On 25 August, Lithuania announced that it would be providing 15 instructors in September and aiming to train up to 150 Ukrainian specialists through October.

On 27 October 2022, Australia announced it would be sending 70 military instructors to join the UK-led training programme from January 2023.

In November 2023, Romania announced it would be joining Operation Interflex.

On 18 January 2024, Kosovo's Ministry of Defence announced that a contingent of 26 instructors would be sent to the UK to join the program to assist with the training of Ukrainian soldiers.

International contributions
Country	Contribution
Albania	Unknown
Australia	70 instructors
Canada	170 instructors
Denmark	130 instructors
Estonia	30 instructors
Finland	20 instructors
Kosovo	26 instructors
Latvia	Unknown
Lithuania	25 instructors
Norway	150 instructors
Netherlands	90 instructors
New Zealand	149 instructors
Romania	30 instructors
Sweden	120 instructors

== See also ==
- European Union Military Assistance Mission in support of Ukraine – Active military training mission of the European Union
- Multinational Force–Ukraine – Proposed force for peace enforcement
- Operation Unifier – Canadian Armed Forces operation in Ukraine
- Ukraine Defense Contact Group – Defensive alliance against 2022 Russian invasion of Ukraine
- Ukraine–United Kingdom relations
