= Basal, Hungary =

Basal
- Flag Coat of arms

- Location of Baranya county in Hungary

- Location of Basal, Hungary
- Coordinates: 46.07489°N 17.78423°E
- Country: Hungary
- County: Baranya

Area
  - Total: 4.04 km^{2} (1.56 sq mi)

Population (2004)
  - Total: 208
  - Density: 51.48/km^{2} (133.3/sq mi)
- Time zone: UTC+1 (CET)
  - Summer (DST): UTC+2 (CEST)
- Postal code: 7922
- Area code: 73

Basal (Croatian: Bašalija) is a village in Baranya county, Hungary.
