= Galician Protocol =

The Galician Protocol was a secret agreement created in Berlin. First mentioned in a letter from Austrian Foreign Minister Count Czernin to Ambassador Prince von Hohenlohe in March 1918. This agreement was to be part of a treaty of peace with Ukraine. Ukraine was obligated to send over one million tons of grain to the Central Powers before July 1918 and get in exchange Eastern Galicia.

There were only to be two copies of the treaty, and Berlin would destroy its copy if Ukraine did not supply its duties.

== Sources ==
- Nahayewsky, Isidore. "History of the Modern Ukrainian State 1917–1923. (Munich: Ukrainian Free University, 1966) p. 115.
