= Treaty of Brest-Litovsk (Ukraine–Central Powers) =

1918 peace treaty during World War I

Treaty of Brest-Litovsk (9 February 1918)
Brotfrieden Берестейський мир
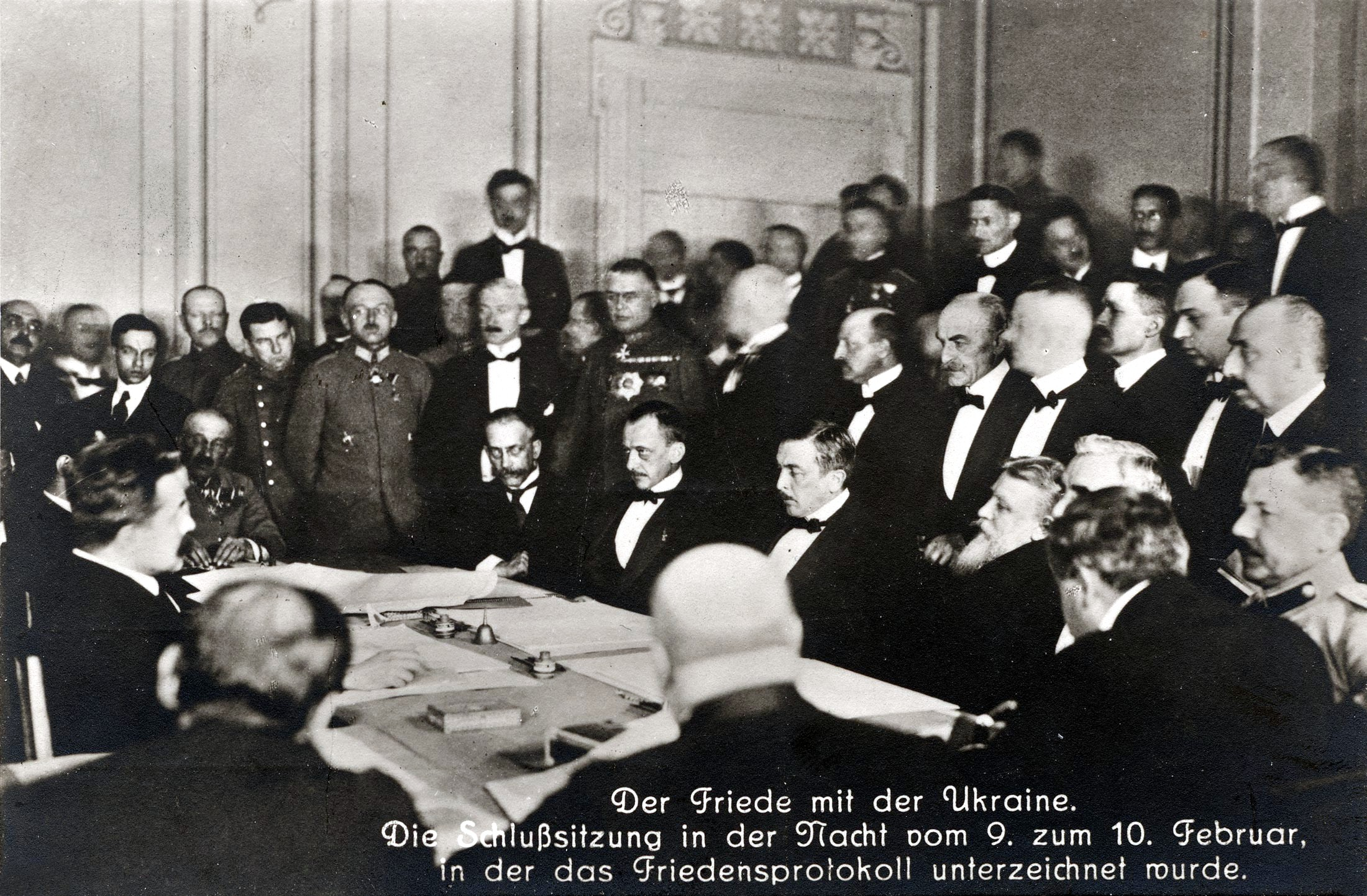
- Signing of the Peace Treaty of Brest-Litovsk during the night of 9-10 February 1918. Sitting in the middle from the left: Count Ottokar Czernin, Richard von Kühlmann and Vasil Radoslavov
- Signed: 9 February [O.S. 27 January] 1918
- Location: Brest-Litovsk, Grodno Governorate (under German occupation)
- Signatories: Germany; Austria-Hungary; Bulgaria; Ottoman Empire; Ukrainian People's Republic
- Languages: Bulgarian; German; Hungarian; Ottoman Turkish; Ukrainian

The Treaty of Brest-Litovsk, also known as the Bread Peace (Note: On 9 February 1918, the Central Powers formally recognized the Ukrainian Rada with a peace treaty usually known as the "Bread Peace" [Brotfrieden].") (German: Brotfrieden) or Peace of Brest (Ukrainian: Берестейський мир, romanized: Beresteiskyi myr, "Berestian Peace"), was signed on 9 February 1918 between the Ukrainian People's Republic (UPR) and the Central Powers (Germany, Austria-Hungary, the Ottoman Empire, and Bulgaria). It ended Ukraine's involvement in World War I and saw the Central Powers recognise the UPR's sovereignty. The treaty, which followed the armistice on the Eastern Front in December 1917, was signed at Brest-Litovsk (now Brest, Belarus). The Bread Peace fixed the Austro-Hungarian–Ukrainian border on the line of 1914 and made provision for a joint commission to determine the border with Poland. The Central Powers secured grain and other goods from the UPR in return for providing military assistance against the Bolsheviks.

While various negotiators at Brest-Litovsk were seeking to establish a general peace, the Austro-Hungarian delegation was in desperate need of getting access to Ukrainian foodstuffs to address a disastrous famine unfolding amongst its military and civilian population, choosing to sign a separate peace first with the Ukrainian People's Republic delegation, sent from the Central Rada in Kiev (modern Kyiv). The peace delegation from Soviet Russia, led by Leon Trotsky, did not recognise the UPR delegation, instead recognising a delegation from the Ukrainian People's Republic of Soviets based in Kharkov (modern Kharkiv). Polish representatives from Congress Poland and Austrian Galicia also objected to several terms in the treaty (particularly the concession of Kholm Governorate to Ukraine), and the fact that the Central Powers chose to conclude a separate peace with Ukraine rather than working out a general peace treaty. As a result, negotiations between the other parties broke down on 10 February, and it would take until 3 March 1918 until the Central Powers and Soviet Russia concluded their own separate Treaty of Brest-Litovsk. The fact that Austria-Hungary justified recognising Ukrainian independence on the basis of national self-determination also had the unintended consequence of stimulating nationalist separatism amongst the ethnic minorities within its own borders, speeding up the dissolution of Austria-Hungary within the following nine months.

After the treaty was signed, Austro-German troops intervened in Ukraine and helped drive out the Red Army by April 1918. The presence of Central Powers forces undermined the independence of the Rada and lead to establishment of the Ukrainian State of Hetman Pavlo Skoropadskyi. After the end of World War I and the Ukrainian–Soviet War, the UPR's former territory was split between the Ukrainian Soviet Socialist Republic (absorbed into the Soviet Union) and independent Poland in the Treaty of Riga (1921). The Treaty of Rapallo (1922) between Germany and Russia canceled Germany's recognition of the UPR.

== Background ==
Because of the civil unrest in the Russian Republic culminating in the October Revolution, the Third Universal of the Ukrainian Central Rada (20 November 1917) declared the formation of the Ukrainian People's Republic under the government of the General Secretariat of Ukraine. The latter announced elections for the Ukrainian Constituent Assembly to be held on 9 January 1918 and the first convocation on 22 January that year.

On 17 December 1917, Vladimir Lenin, as the head of the Sovnarkom, released an ultimatum in which he accused the Central Rada of disorganising the front lines, stopping "any troops going into the region of the Don, the Urals, or elsewhere"; sheltering political enemies such as the members of the Cadet Party and those who had sided with Kaledin and requiring to "put an end to the attempts to crush the armies of the Soviet and of the Red Guard in Ukraine". Lenin gave twenty-four hours' notice to the government of what he called "the independent and bourgeois Republic of the Ukraine" to respond. Since Soviet armies were already in Ukraine, the government of Ukraine had to act quickly to preserve the sovereignty of the state.

"The only way to save the situation is by acting quickly and energetically with the Ukrainian delegation." (Czernin, personal diary, 4 Jan. 1918)

"If this outrageous provisioning situation (...) continues, then in a few weeks we will certainly have a collapse and revolution." (Czernin to Emperor Charles, 15 Jan. 1918)

"The entire fate of the Monarchy and the dynasty depends upon the earliest possible conclusion of peace at Brest-Litovsk... If the peace at Brest does not become reality, then there will be revolution here no matter how much there is to eat." (Emperor Charles to Czernin, 17 Jan. 1918)

The Ukrainian Central Rada expressed a desire for a peace treaty with foreign countries and its recognition worldwide. Since the representatives of the British and the French Empires did not wish to recognise Ukrainian sovereignty, considering it as a part of their major ally, the Russian Empire, the treaty gave a chance for some recognition in the face of the Central Powers. Germany and Austria-Hungary gladly took the opportunity to bring in Ukraine as an ally. Austria-Hungary was edging towards a military victory on all fronts by late 1917, but the Austrian political leadership had been getting increasingly desperate for food since late 1917, in order to feed its starving civilian population in Cisleithania and prevent famine and large-scale civil unrest. In peacetime, Transleithania (the Hungarian part of the Habsburg monarchy) provided 65% of Cisleithania's cereal imports, equal to 32% of Austria's requirements; but since the war broke out in 1914, Hungary had prioritised feeding its own population, and Hungarian grain and flour exports to Austria dropped to 2.4% of their pre-war average in 1917.

By early 1918, getting food supplies and preventing popular revolt (as in Russia) dominated Austria-Hungary's foreign policy. This undermined the Habsburgs' military leverage during the Brest-Litovsk peace negotiations, not just in the face of their enemies, but also towards their German allies, as both Central Powers sought to acquire Congress Poland. Vienna desperately sought access to Ukraine's food supplies as soon as possible, as domestic demand for bread and peace soared during the winter of 1917–1918. Hence, Czernin dubbed the proposed treaty with the Ukrainians as a "bread peace" (Brotfrieden).

== Peace negotiations ==
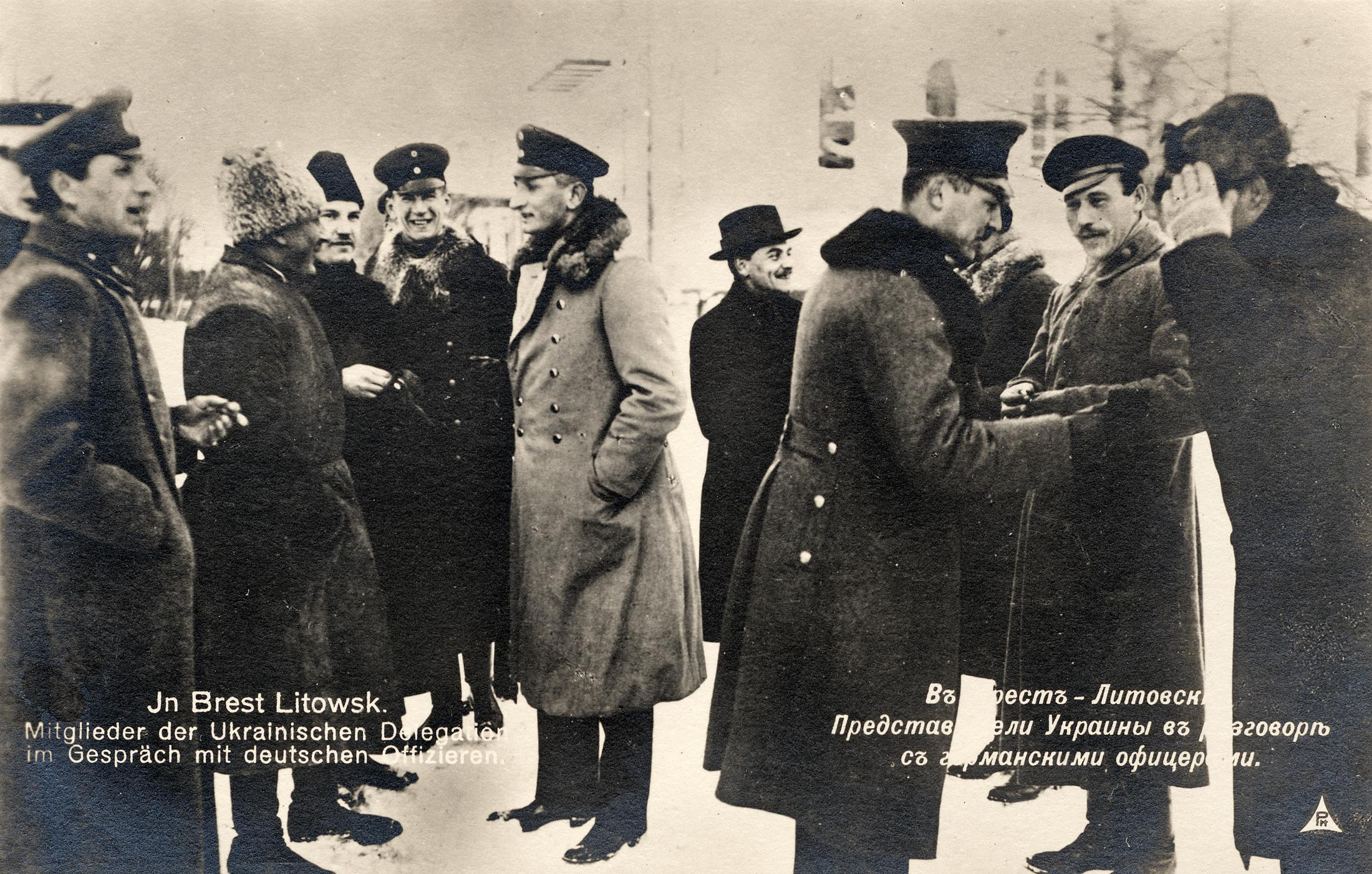
Delegates from the Ukrainian People's Republic and the Central Powers during a break in the negotiations in Brest-Litovsk, early February 1918

The peace negotiation was initiated on 3 December 1917 by the Russian Soviet Federative Socialist Republic government, represented by a delegation headed by the Ukrainian-born Leon Trotsky. The Centrals and Bolsheviks concluded the Armistice of 15 December 1917 (2 December 1917 according to the Julian calendar), which took effect on 17 December. Several resolutions were made from 22 to 26 December, and on 28 December 1917, an armistice was signed suspending hostilities at the front lines. A Soviet government of the Ukrainian Socialist Soviet Republic had been formed in Kharkiv on 17 December 1917. The final signing was being delayed by the Bolsheviks in the hope of reaching some agreement with the Entente treaty members.

On 1 January 1918, a Ukrainian delegation, headed by Vsevolod Holubovych, arrived at Brest-Litovsk. The initial delegation beside Mykola Liubynsky, Oleksandr Sevriuk, and Mykola Levytsky included Mykhailo Poloz. Initially, the Trotsky-led delegation on behalf of Soviet Russia recognised the delegation of the independent Ukraine People's Republic (UPR) on 10 January 1918. On 12 January 1918, the Austrian Count Ottokar Czernin, representing the Central Powers, also recognised the independent delegation from the Ukrainian People's Republic. But Czernin and Hungarian diplomat Csáky refused to discuss questions of Galicia, Bucovina, and Subcarpathian Rus, which they considered internal Habsburg affairs. They did acknowledge the claims of the Ukrainian People's Republic to the Kholm Governorate (including Brest-Litovsk itself, where the peace talks were held), and the region of Podlachia, causing protests from Polish stakeholders.

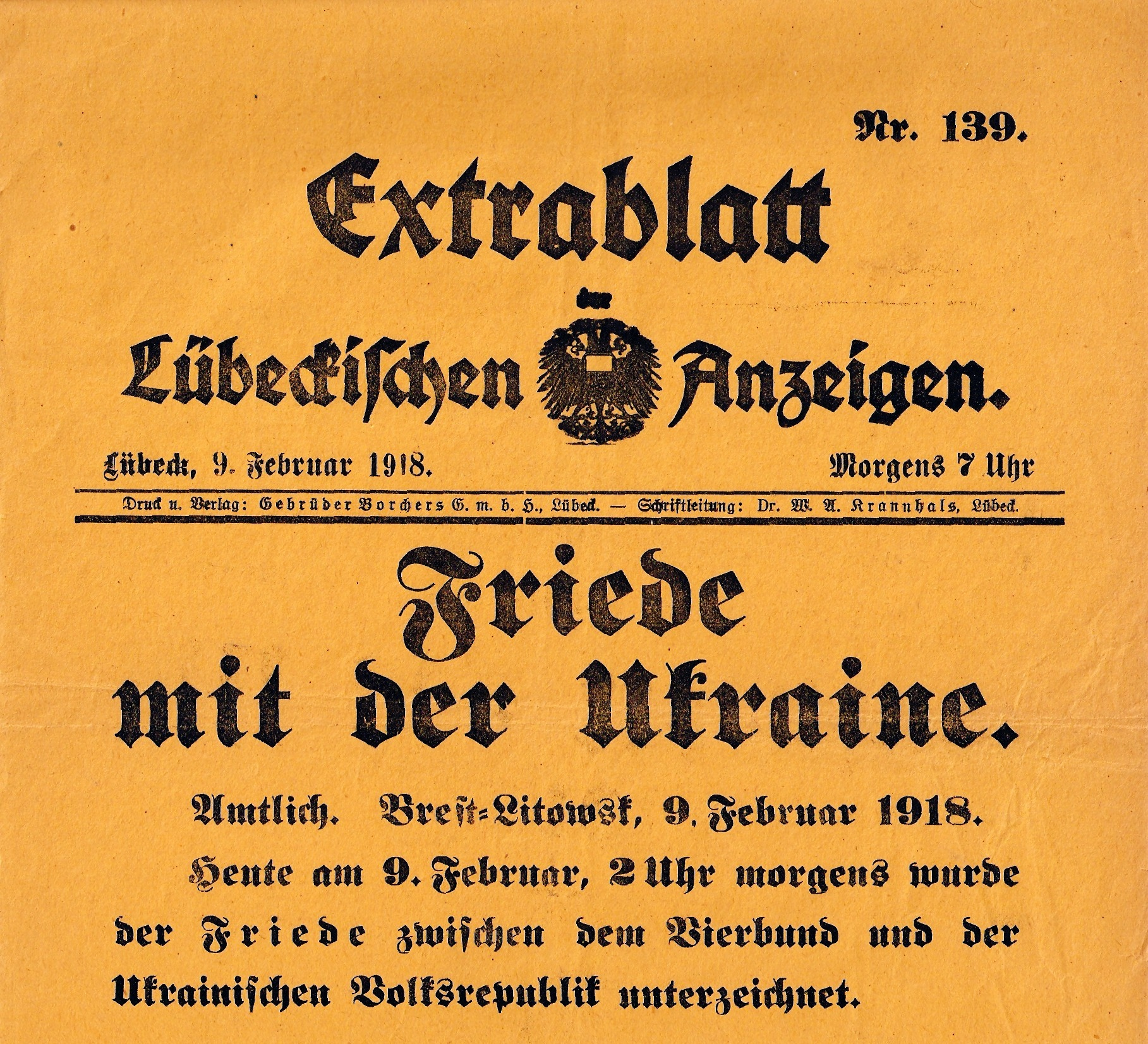
Special 9 February 1918 edition of German newspaper Lübeckische Anzeigen. The headline says "Peace with Ukraine".

On 20 January 1918, the Ukrainian delegation returned to Kiev, where the Central Rada proclaimed a fully-sovereign Ukrainian state on 25 January (dated 22 January). Soon, a new Ukrainian delegation was sent to Brest headed by Oleksandr Sevriuk. Meanwhile, Bolshevik revolts occurred in several cities in Ukraine, which more or less forced the Ukrainian People's Republic, which was lacking organised military forces, to seek foreign aid. However, the situation for the Central Powers was also critical, especially for Austria-Hungary, which suffered severe food shortages.

On 21 January 1918, the Bolshevik Russian delegation announced that the Kharkiv-based Bolshevik Ukrainian Republic of Soviets would be attending the peace talks, and began demanding that they should be recognised as the sole representatives of Ukraine rather than the Kyiv-based Central Rada's delegation. On 1 February 1918, a plenary session of the Congress was indeed attended by the Kharkiv Bolshevik delegates Yukhym Medvediev and Vasyl' Shakhrai. But the Central Powers continued to negotiate with the delegation from the Ukrainian People's Republic as the sole representatives of Ukraine, regarding the Kharkiv delegation as a Bolshevik ploy to prevent the Centrals from concluding their agreement with the UNR. Previously, Czernin had tried not to make national self-determination a guiding principle during the talks, given the risk of precluding an Austro-Polish union and stimulating nationalist separatism within the Habsburg empire. However, by early February, he had exhausted all other means of obtaining emergency food supplies, and he could only proceed by granting Ukrainian self-determination, acknowledging their territorial claims on Chełm and pledging a new autonomous Ruthenian crownland in eastern Galicia and Bukovina; in exchange for much-needed grain exports to Cisleithania. The danger that the famine-borne popular riots in Austria could escalate into a full-blown revolution that threatened the very survival of the Habsburg state was greater than that posed by antagonising the Polish nationalists, the Russian and Ukrainian Bolsheviks, the German allies, and Austria's own quest to acquire Congress Poland as its prize for the war.

Although the Central Rada had to evacuate from Kyiv on 8 February when the capital was overcome by Bolshevik troops, a peace treaty was signed between the Central Powers and the People's Republic on the night of 8–9 February, despite protests by Bolshevik delegates from Kharkiv and Moscow.

A special edition (Extrablatt) of the German newspaper Lübeckische Anzeigen printed an announcement on "Peace with Ukraine": "Today on 9 February 1918 at 2 o'clock in the morning the Peace between the Quadruple Alliance and the Ukrainian People's Republic was signed".

== Signatories ==
Signatories of the Treaty of Brest-Litovsk
Ukraine		German Empire		Austria-Hungary		Bulgaria		Ottoman Empire	
Head of delegation	Sevriuk	Foreign state secretary	von Kühlmann	Foreign Minister	Czernin	Prime Minister	Radoslavov	Grand Vizier	Mehmed Talat
Foreign Minister	Liubynsky	Ober Ost	Hoffmann			Ambassador	Toshev		I. Hakki Pasha
	Levytsky						I. Stoianovich		A. Nessimi Bey
Economical Adviser	Ostapenko						T. Anastasov; P. Ganchev		Ahmed İzzet Pasha

Within days of the treaty's signing, an army of over 450,000 men from the Central Powers entered Ukraine, and after only a month, most of the Bolshevik troops had left the country without any significant resistance. Soon after the takeover of Kiev by Ukrainian and German troops, the Tsentralna Rada could return to Kiev on 2 March.

== Terms ==
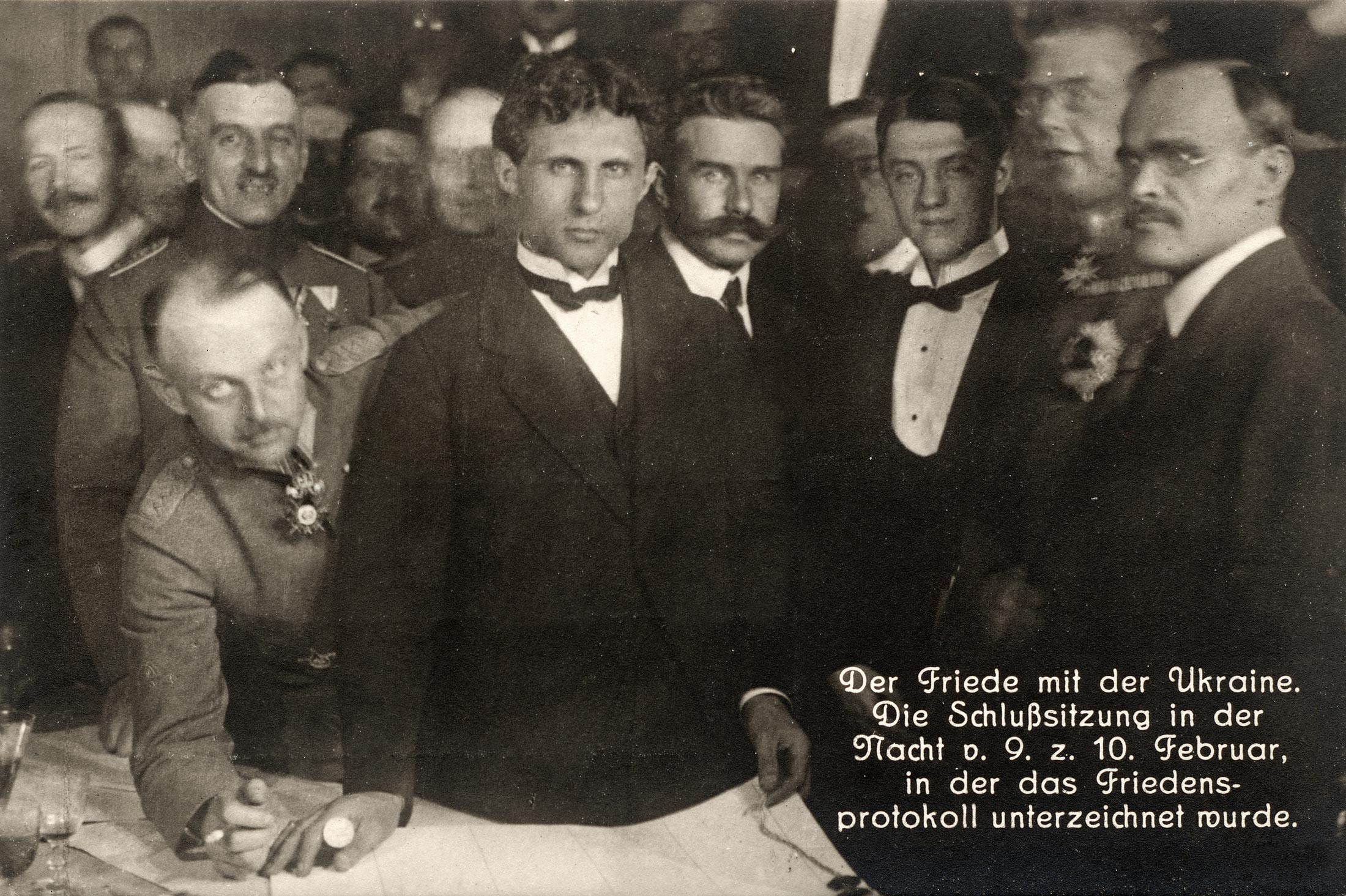
Closing session of the Peace protocol signing during the night of 9-10 February 1918. From the left: General Brinkmann, Mykola Liubynsky, Mykola Levytsky, Oleksandr Sevriuk, General Max Hoffmann and Serhiy Ostapenko

The treaty recognised the following as the Ukrainian People's Republic's boundaries: in the west, the 1914 Austro-Hungarian–Russian boundary, which excluded the Ukrainian Galicia in the new Ukrainian state; in the north, the line running from Tarnogród, Biłgoraj, Szczebrzeszyn, Krasnystaw, Radzyń Podlaski and Międzyrzec Podlaski in the present Lublin Voivodeship (Poland); Sarnaki, in the present Masovian Voivodeship (Poland) and Kamyanyets and Pruzhany, in the present Brest Region (Belarus). The exact boundaries were to be determined by a mixed commission on the basis of ethnic composition and the will of the inhabitants (Article 2). According to the census conducted by the Austrian troops in 1916 in these areas (counties of Biłgoraj, Chełm, Hrubieszów, Tomaszów, Zamość) the Catholic population constituted from 65 to 85%, the people speaking Polish from 78 to 98% of the total population, while the Orthodox population constituted from 2 to 10%, and the people speaking Ruthenian from 0 to 3% of the total population.

The treaty also provided for the regulated evacuation of the occupied regions (Article 3), the establishment of diplomatic relations (Article 4), mutual renunciation of war reparations (Article 5), the return of prisoners of war (Article 6) and the exchange of interned civilians and the renewal of public and private legal relations (Article 8). Article 7 provided for the immediate resumption of economic relations and trade and also set down the principles of accounting and tariffs.

Austria-Hungary and the Ukrainian People's Republic also signed a secret agreement regarding Galicia and Bukovina. Austria-Hungary agreed to unify by 31 July 1918 into one crownland the areas of eastern Galicia and Bukovina in which the Ukrainian population predominated, but on 4 July Austria-Hungary annulled the secret agreement under the pretext that Ukraine had not delivered to it the amount of grain promised under the treaty, but it is believed to be really the result of Polish pressure. On the other hand the reason for annulment was that after the Vienna's requested to keep the agreement secret, but Sevriuk, excited with the signing of the Treaty of Brest-Litovsk disclosed the information to the Ukrainians of Lemberg (Lviv). The revelation of the secret in such way led the Austro-Hungarians to destroy the copy of the agreement and later denied the existence of it in any way, while Czernin soon resigned.

The Central Powers signed a separate Treaty of Brest-Litovsk with the Russian Soviet Federative Socialist Republic on 3 March 1918. Russia agreed to recognise the concluded treaty with the Ukrainian People's Republic and to sign a peace treaty with Ukraine immediately to define the borders between Russia and Ukraine without delay, to clear the Ukrainian territory of Russian troops and the Russian Red Guard and to put an end to all agitation or propaganda against the government or the public institutions of the Ukrainian People's Republic (article 6).

== Aftermath ==
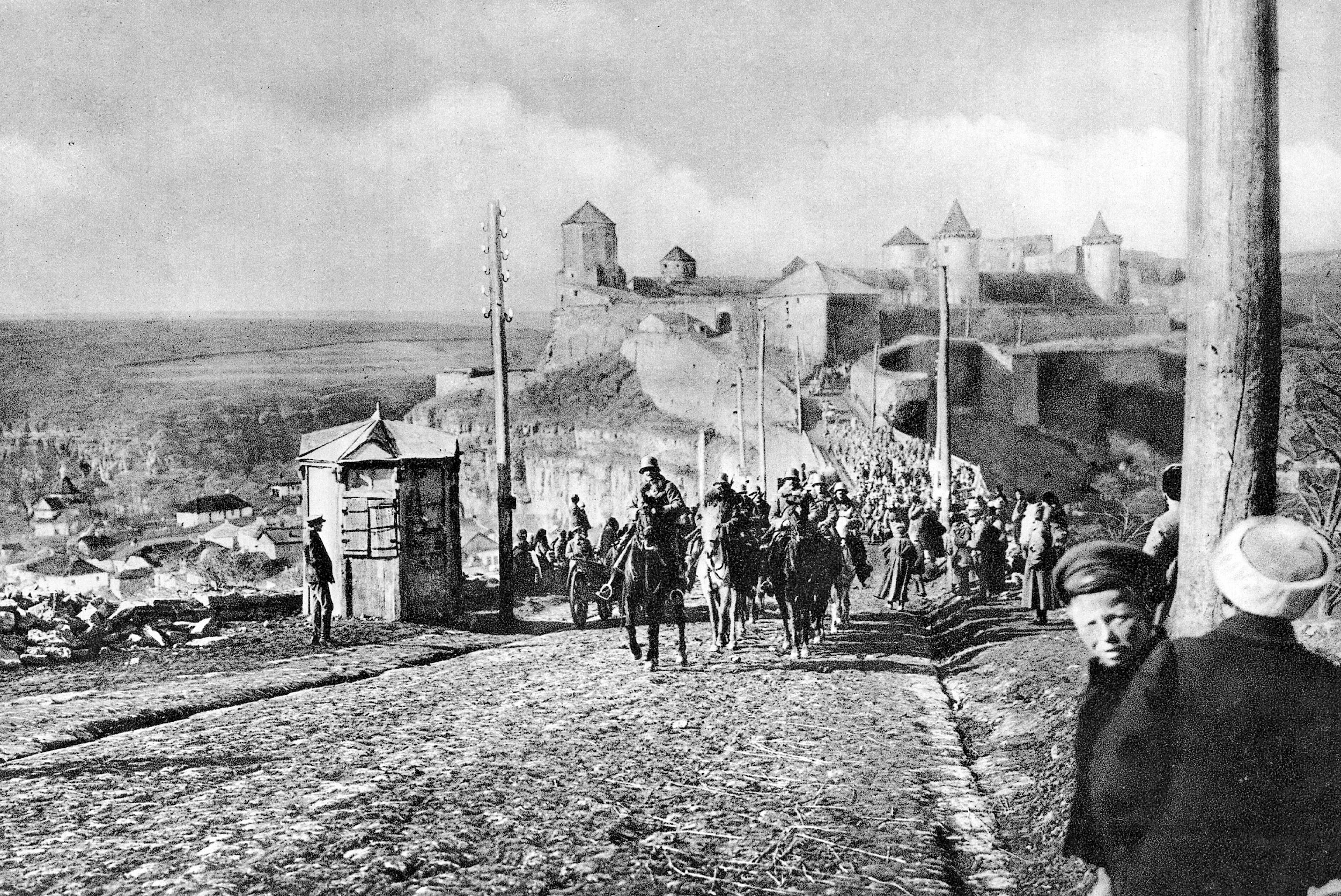
Austro-Hungarian troops entering Kamianets-Podilskyi after the treaty had been signed in Brest-Litovsk (Austria-Hungary War Press bureau)

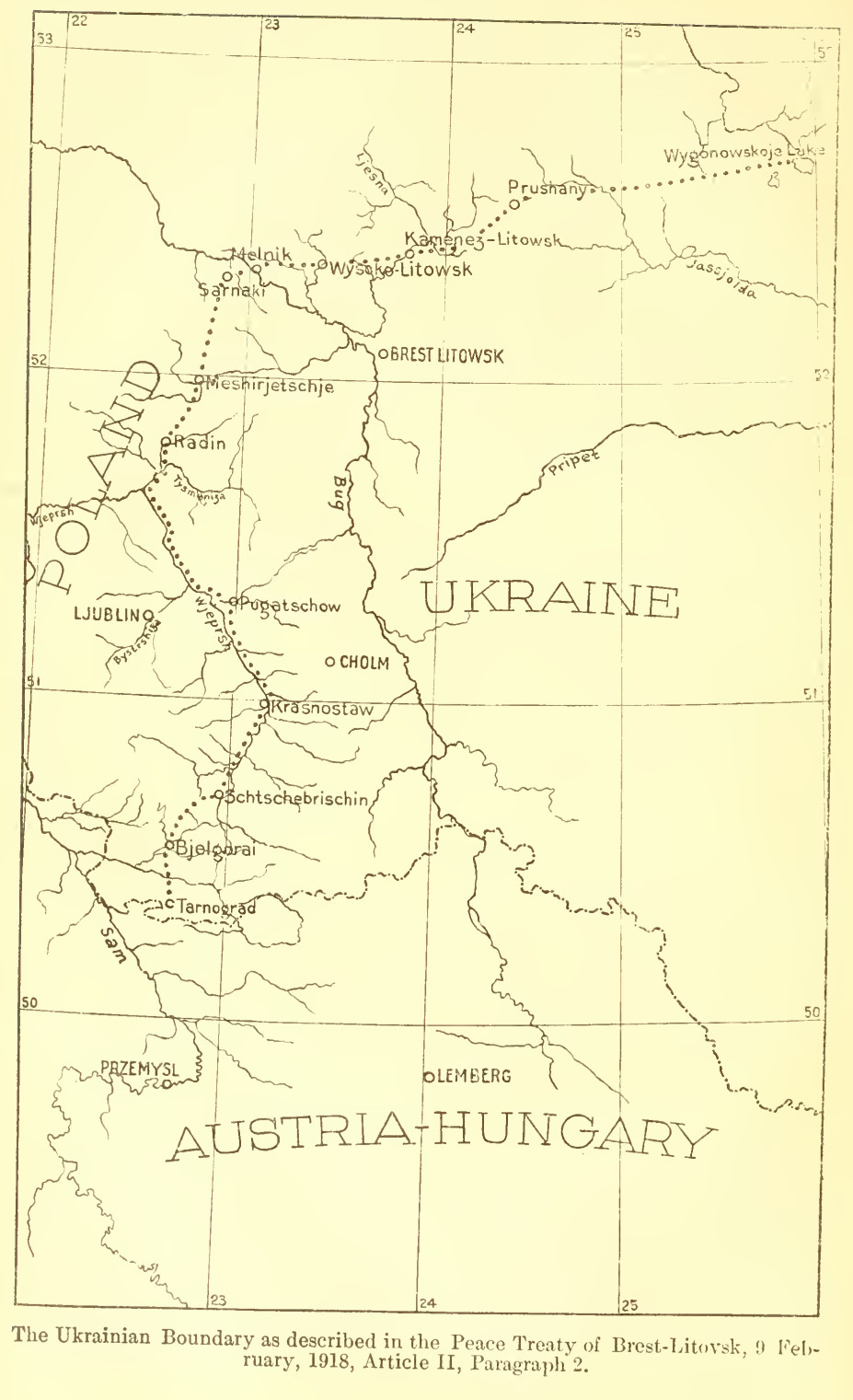
Northwestern boundary of Ukraine per the treaty

The treaty immediately caused much opposition among Poles, particularly those in Austria-Hungary. Polish politicians in the Austrian Parliament immediately began their protests, paralysing it; civil servants began a strike; and spontaneous demonstrations took place in various cities and towns. Most notably, the Polish Auxiliary Corps refused to follow imperial orders, and, after the Battle of Rarańcza, broke through the front lines to join Polish forces in the Russian Civil War. Although the imperial and royal government in Vienna withdrew from parts of the treaty on 4 March 1918, the damage inflicted on any remaining sense of loyalty or trust towards the monarchy among the Poles was devastating and beyond repairability, while the pro-Habsburg and anti-independence faction of the Polish politicians participating in the government suffered total humiliation and irreversible discreditation in the eyes of the Polish population which ceased to regard any possible Austro-Polish Solution as a viable option, focusing instead entirely on re-establishing independence.

The Treaty of Brest-Litovsk provided the Ukrainian People's Republic with German and Austro-Hungarian military aid in clearing Bolshevik forces from Ukraine in February–April 1918, but the treaty also meant that the Entente Powers suspended relations with the Ukrainian People's Republic.

Soon, however, the invited foreign forces from the Central Powers were seen as occupiers by a major part of the Ukrainian population and also parts of the Tsentralna Rada. In late April, the German Supreme Commander in Ukraine, Hermann von Eichhorn, issued an order making Ukrainians subject to German military courts for offenses against German interests, the First Ukrainian Division (the Blue coats) was disarmed and German soldiers even arrested two ministers after they had criticised the German actions. The final break with the Tsentralna Rada came on 29 April, when General Pavlo Skoropadskyi declared himself hetman of the Ukrainian state.

The Treaty of Rapallo of 1922 between Germany and Soviet Russia canceled the German commitments made at Brest-Litovsk. The disintegration of Austria-Hungary in late 1918 automatically annulled its commitments. Turkey renounced the Treaty of Brest-Litovsk by signing a treaty with the Ukrainian SSR in 1922. Only Bulgaria, as far as is known, did not formally annul the treaty.

== See also ==
- Galician Protocol
- Ukraine during World War I

== Sources ==
- Volodymyr Kubijovyč (ed.): Ukraine – A Concise Encyclopaedia I. University of Toronto Press 1963.
- Maxwell, Alexander (2013). "Ukrainian frontiers in Austro-Hungarian and American popular cartography, 1917–1918". New Zealand Slavonic Journal. 47/48. Australia and New Zealand Slavists' Association: 125–153. ISSN 0028-8683. JSTOR 44174178.
- Orest Subtelny: Ukraine – A history. ISBN 0-8020-7191-0.
- US Department of State. Proceedings of the Brest-Litovsk Peace Conference: the peace negotiations between Russia and the Central Powers 21 November 1917–3 March 1918. "Government Printing Office". Washington, 1918.
- Wargelin, Clifford F. (1997). "A High Price for Bread: The First Treaty of Brest- Litovsk and the Break-Up of Austria-Hungary, 1917–1918". The International History Review. 19 (4): 757–788. doi:10.1080/07075332.1997.9640803. ISSN 0707-5332.
