= Marzia Basel =

Lawyer, education activist from Afghanistan

- Born: 1968 (age 57–58); Kabul, Kingdom of Afghanistan
- Citizenship: Afghanistan
- Education: George Washington University

Marzia Basel (born 1968) is a former judge in Afghanistan. During the rule of the Taliban, she secretly educated women in her own home. She is also the founder of the Afghanistan Progressive Law Organization.

== Biography ==
Basel grew up in Kabul within a middle class liberal family. Her father was a judge as well and her sisters are lawyers. In 1995, Basel was sworn in as a judge. A year later, the Taliban banned all women professionals and prohibited educating women. All women then had to wear a burqa and Basel recalls that she felt "imprisoned, both literally and figuratively. In the summer it was so hot that I felt as though I were slowly suffocating. Peering out of that tiny mesh cage, I felt like a caged animal, which is exactly what I and other women had become: caged animals stripped of any freedom or dignity."

When the Taliban were in power, Basel defied the laws against educating women and taught English out of her home between 1996 and 2001. Basel had approximately 350 to 400 students between the ages of eight and fifty. Her students, some of whom were wives of Taliban adherents, warned her if they knew she was going to be visited by the Ministry for the Protection of Virtue and Prevention of Vice. Just before the Taliban regime was removed, Basel fled to Pakistan as a refugee for her safety.

In 2002, she founded the Afghan Women Judges Association (AWJA). Her efforts to help support women working in the administration of justice system in Afghanistan increased the number of women defense lawyers from 1 woman in 2005 to 150 women in 2013. Basel has been the director of the AWJA since 2009.

Also in 2002, Basel went to the United States and met with then President George W. Bush, United States Secretary of State, Colin Powell, and others in order to ask for additional assistance for Afghanistan. Despite being told to respect the customs of the country she was visiting, on her return, she faced severe criticism for not always wearing a chador to cover her hair. There was controversy over whether she was fired, but Basel was recorded as saying that she left to join UNICEF to help create a juvenile justice program.

She continued to be active in women's legal rights and women's rights to practice law. In 2005, she earned her master's in International Law from George Washington University.

Basel eventually had to stay out of Afghanistan because of threats to her life. Messages were left on her door from the Taliban in 2011, stating that if they found her, they would kill her. Her husband and father both urged her to stay out of Afghanistan for her safety. Because of the lack of support systems for immigrants in the United States, she chose to move to Canada. She is currently living in Toronto.
