= Mykola Liubynsky =

Ukrainian politician and diplomat

Mykola Liubynsky Микола Любинський
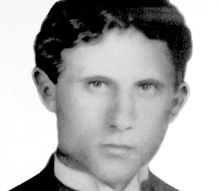

Ministry of Foreign Affairs of Ukraine
- In office March 3, 1918 – April 28, 1918
- Prime Minister: Vsevolod Holubovych
- Preceded by: Vsevolod Holubovych
- Succeeded by: Mykola Vasylenko

Personal details
- Born: 5 October 1891 Khmelnytskyi Oblast
- Died: 8 January 1938 (aged 46) Sandarmokh
- Party: Ukrainian Socialist-Revolutionary Party
- Education: University of Kyiv

Mykola Mykhailovych Liubynsky (Ukrainian: Мико́ла Миха́йлович Люби́нський) (5 October 1891 – 8 January 1938) was a Ukrainian politician and diplomat. He was also Minister of Foreign Affairs of Ukrainian National Republic (1918) and a member of the Ukrainian delegation at the Brest-Litovsk Peace Treaty.

== Education ==
Mykola Liubynsky graduated from the Faculty of Philology of the University of Kyiv (1916).

== Professional career and experience ==
In April 1917 - he was a member of the Ukrainian Central Rada and the Lesser Rada. Later he headed the Ukrainian Socialist-Revolutionary Party.

From December 1917 to February 1918 - he was a participant in the Brest-Litovsk Peace Treaty, where he signed on behalf of the Ukrainian delegation the Appeal to Germany about the need to provide military aid to the Ukrainian National Republic.

In March–April 1918 - he was a member of the Vsevolod Holubovych government.

From March 3, 1918 - April 28, 1918 - Minister of Foreign Affairs of Ukraine

In 1920s - he lived in Kyiv, was a research associate at the Institute of the Ukrainian Scientific Language and co-editor of the Bulletin of the Institute of the Ukrainian Scientific Language.

In 1930 - he was sentenced to three years’ imprisonment and five years of internal exile.

November 12, 1937 - He was arrested.

December 15, 1937 - Sentenced to the highest degree of punishment, by a special troika of the Leningrad Regional NKVD Directorate.

January 8, 1938 - he was executed by firing squad in Sandarmokh, Karelia.

Liubynsky was partially rehabilitated in 1989.
