= Operation Unifier =

Canadian Armed Forces operation in Ukraine

Operation UNIFIER
- Part of Russo-Ukrainian War
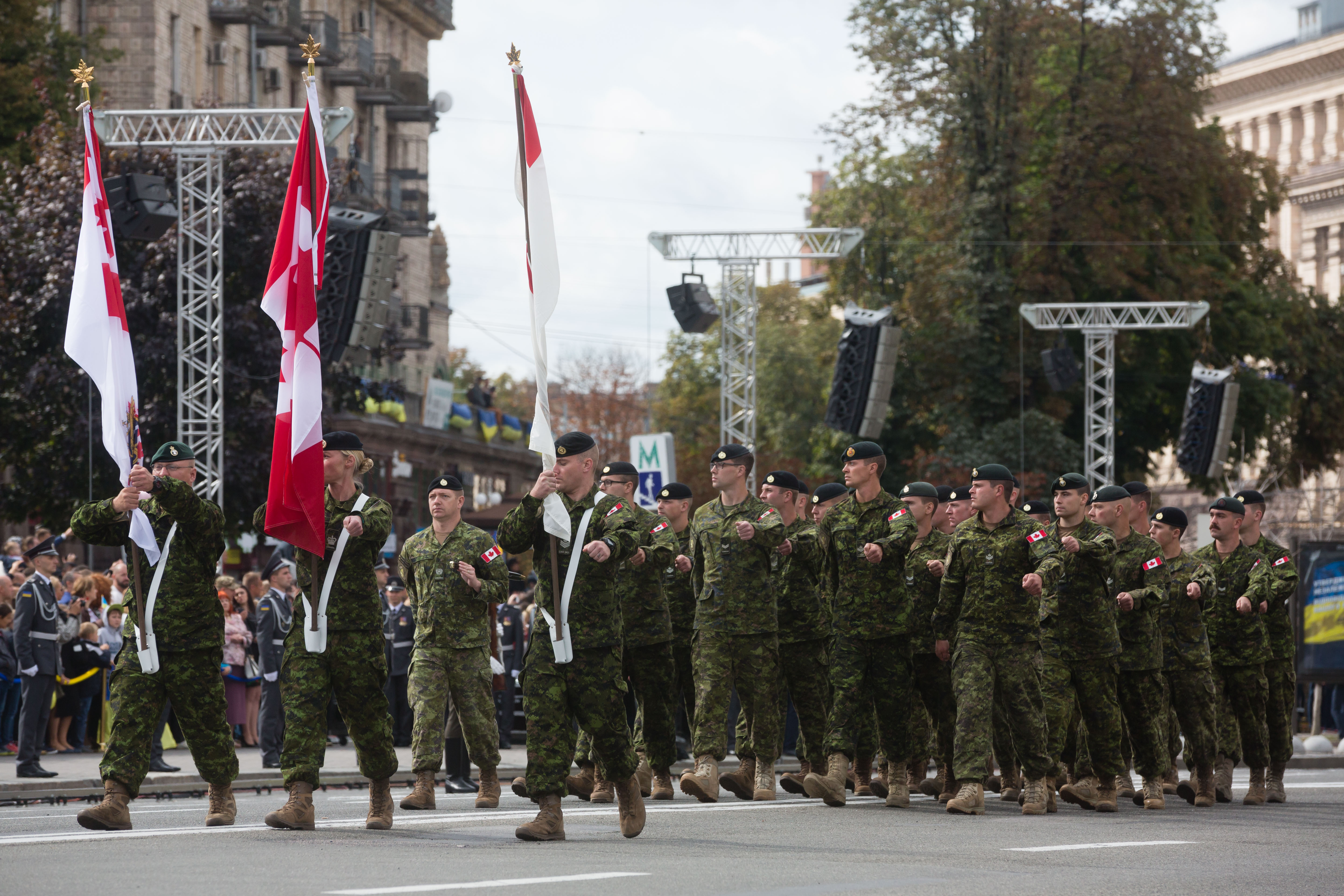
- Canadian military personnel participating in the Ukrainian Independence Day military parade in Kyiv, 2017
- Location: International Peacekeeping and Security Centre, Starychi, Ukraine (until 2022); Poland and United Kingdom (from 2022)
- Planned by: Canada; France
- Commanded by: Thomas J. Lawson 2015; Stephen Harper 2015; Jason Kenney 2015; Justin Trudeau 2015–2025; Harjit Sajjan 2015–2021; Jonathan Vance 2015–2021; Art McDonald 2021; Anita Anand 2021–2023; Wayne Eyre 2021–2024; Bill Blair 2023–2025; Jennie Carignan 2024–; Mark Carney 2025–; David McGuinty 2025–; François Hollande 2012–2017; Emmanuel Macron 2017–; Jean-Yves Le Drian 2012–2017; Florence Parly 2017–2022; Sébastien Lecornu 2022–; Pierre de Villiers 2014–2017; François Lecointre 2017–2021; Thierry Burkhard 2021–; Magdalena Andersson 2021–2022; Ulf Kristersson 2022–; Petro Poroshenko; Volodymyr Zelenskyy
- Objective: Bolster the capabilities of the Armed Forces of Ukraine; Helping the development of the region; Maintaining security; Maintaining democracy; Providing humanitarian aid; Promoting economic stability and growth
- Date: 24 February 2015 – 17 February 2022
- Executed by: Canadian Armed Forces; France and French Armed Forces; Swedish Armed Forces; Armed Forces of Ukraine
- Outcome: Training provided to 22,000 Ukrainian military personnel; Training suspended ahead of the Russian invasion of Ukraine; Launch of Operation Interflex

Operation UNIFIER was the Canadian Armed Forces and French Armed Forces mission to bolster the capabilities of the Armed Forces of Ukraine through the provision of critical military training. It was launched in 2015 in response to the 2014 Russian annexation of Crimea. It provided training to over 22,000 Ukrainian military personnel before it was suspended ahead of the Russian invasion of Ukraine. It was stood up in response to requests from the Government of Ukraine in light of fomentation by separatist sentiments in the Donetsk and Luhansk and Crimean regions of Ukraine after the 2014 Ukrainian revolution and the 2014 pro-Russian unrest in Ukraine. Up until the 2022 Russian invasion of Ukraine, the training mission took place in Ukraine through a Multinational Joint Commission which included Canada, France, Denmark, Lithuania, Poland, Slovakia, Sweden, Ukraine, the United Kingdom, and the United States.

Since August 2022, the Canadian and French militaries have been working alongside the British Ministry of Defence in England to deliver training to Ukrainian recruits under Operation Interflex.

== History ==
In the past, this operation was part of the Multinational Joint Commission, a larger body composed of the U.S., UK, Canada, Sweden, Poland, Lithuania and Denmark, aimed at reforming Ukraine's military. The first Canadian troops to participate in the operation came from the 1st Battalion of the Royal Canadian Regiment. The Canadian contribution of training is provided by about 200 Canadian soldiers, rotating every six months, increased to 260 in January 2022. As of November 2018 there had been 230 course sessions and more than 10,000 Ukrainian soldiers trained under Operation UNIFIER. After 2018, a small Swedish contingent operated within the framework. In December 2021, three Swedish officers were in Ukraine within the framework of Operation UNIFIER.

== Timeline ==
Canada made its first airmail delivery of non-lethal military equipment to Ukraine on August 7-8, 2014. This equipment mainly included cold protective clothing and was delivered to Boryspil International Airport by the Royal Canadian Air Force (RCAF).

On January 10, 2015, the first shipment of non-lethal military equipment to Ukraine by sea arrived at the port of Odesa.

On April 14, 2015, Canada announced the deployment of a CAF task force, known as Joint Task Force Ukraine or Operation UNIFIER, with nearly 200 Canadian Armed Forces stationed in Ukraine until March 31, 2017. The military training mission officially began on 14 September 2015 at the International Center for Security and Peacekeeping in Starychi and the Ukrainian Ministry of Defense Demining Center in Kamianets-Podilskyi. Newly-promoted Minister of National Defence Jason Kenney announced Canadian military personnel would instruct Ukrainian forces as part of a $700 million gift he called Operation UNIFIER.

On December 8, 2015, the Minister of National Defence of Canada, Harjit Sajjan, announced that his country had signed an agreement with Ukraine for joint military training and for strengthening its military capabilities.

On March 6, 2017, the Government of Canada announced the extension of Operation UNIFIER until the end of March 2019.

On March 18, 2019, the Government of Canada announced the extension of Operation UNIFIER until the end of March 2022.

On January 26, 2022, the Government of Canada announced the extension of Operation UNIFIER until the end of March 2025, and increased the complement of 200 by another 60.

On February 13 the CAF announced that the operation would be temporarily suspended due to the 2021–2022 Russo-Ukrainian crisis, with most of the units involved being sent to Poland. Canada has assured Ukraine that the withdrawal is only temporary. The Swedish contingent was also withdrawn at this time.

On February 24, 2022, Russia invaded Ukraine in a major escalation of the Russo-Ukrainian War, which began in 2014.

The CAF personnel who were deployed on Op UNIFIER returned to Canada on March 18, 2022.

On April 20, 2022, Russia announced retaliatory sanctions against a number of senior Canadian military officials as well soldiers who commanded Operation UNIFIER in Ukraine since 2015 prohibiting them from entering Russia.

In August 2022, CAF personnel deployed to the UK to resume the training of Ukrainian recruits, with the expectation to assist with the training of approximately 10,000 Security Force soldiers.

Between October 2022 and March 2023, CAF has deployed combat engineers, soldiers and medical personnel to Poland to assist in the training of the Ukrainian forces.

== Mission ==
According to lobbyists from the NATO Association of Canada, Operation UNIFIER's broader mission includes:

- Helping the development of the region
- Maintaining security
- Maintaining democracy
- Providing humanitarian aid
- Promoting economic stability and growth

== Ukrainian diaspora response ==
Members of the Ukrainian diaspora in Canada positively welcomed the Canadian government's contribution to reform the Ukrainian military. A number of community appreciation events were held in Toronto, Edmonton and Winnipeg for CAF members who have served in Operation UNIFIER. On July 1, 2018, the Band of the Ceremonial Guard performed during its daily guard mounting ceremony on Parliament Hill, a Ukrainian military march known as "Shchob shabli ne braly, shchob Kuli mynaly" (Щоб шаблі не брали, щоб кулі минали) in front of members of the Ukrainian diaspora during the ceremony, as a response to the operation.

== See also ==
- List of Canadian military operations
- Multinational Force–Ukraine – Proposed force for peace enforcement
