= Multinational Joint Commission =

Military training mission to Ukraine

The Multinational Joint Commission (MJC) is composed of the United States, the United Kingdom, Canada, Sweden, Poland, Lithuania and Denmark and aims to reform the military and police of Ukraine.

== History ==
The MJC was seeded by Stephen Harper when in June 2015 he offered $5 million to the Ukrainian state to retrain the National Guard of Ukraine. The MJC was granted by Harper the co-operation of the RCMP in order to create the National Police of Ukraine, which was established on 7 November 2015 and intends to hire 130,000 Ukrainians. The MJC has increased its efforts under Operation Unifier.

== See also ==
Multinational Force–Ukraine – Proposed and planned potential multinational force for Ukraine, 2025
