= Foreign involvement in the Russo-Ukrainian war (2022–present) =

On 24 February 2022, Russia launched a full-scale invasion of Ukraine, escalating the Russo-Ukrainian War that had begun in 2014 and marking the largest military conflict in Europe since World War II. As of 30 June 2025, Ukraine had received approximately €64.6 billion (US $75 billion) in military aid from the United States and about €84.7 billion (US $99 billion) from other international allies, primarily through drawdowns of existing stockpiles that were then delivered to Ukrainian forces. As existing stockpiles are expended, the allied industrial base has been gradually drawn in to supply Ukraine. Since January 2022 and as of August 2025, mostly Western nations have pledged at least €309 billion (US $360 billion) in aid to Ukraine, including approximately €149.3 billion (US $174 billion) in direct military assistance from individual countries.

Additional countries have also contributed, with Canada pledging CA$22 billion in assistance including CA$1.46 billion in military aid, Japan committing ¥1.5 trillion in loans and grants, Australia providing A$2 billion in support, South Korea pledging US$394 million for 2024 and an additional US$100 million in April 2025, and Turkey supplying Bayraktar TB2 drones through donations and co-production agreements.

By the beginning of 2025, the United States has provided around half of all military aid to Ukraine, with European allies providing the other half. According to defense expert Malcolm Chalmers, at the beginning of 2025 US provided 20% of all military equipment Ukraine was using, with 25% provided by Europe and 55% produced by Ukraine. However, the 20% supplied by the US "is the most lethal and important."

Since 2022, no major state actor has matched the West in overt military assistance to Moscow; instead, Russia’s most significant external support has been economic. China accounted for roughly 35 percent of Russia’s oil and gas export revenue in 2024—about US $83 billion of the $241 billion total—providing a critical balance-of-payments lifeline despite Western sanctions. Iran has also supplied hundreds of Shahed loitering munitions to Russian forces, augmenting Moscow’s capabilities on the battlefield. In addition to this, Iran has trained thousands of Russian personnel to operate the drones.

== Foreign military sales and aid to Ukraine ==
Countries delivering military aid to Ukraine Delivered heavy weapons to Ukraine Delivered light weapons or ammunition to Ukraine Delivered non-lethal material military aid to Ukraine Delivered non-material military aid to Ukraine Ukraine

Russia Ukraine Countries sending any aid, including humanitarian aid, to Ukraine

Although Ukraine is not a member of the North Atlantic Treaty Organization (NATO) and does not have a military alliance with the United States or any NATO nation, from 24 January to 3 August 2022, the Kiel Institute has tracked $84.2 billion from the 40 NATO-member countries in financial, humanitarian, and military aid to Ukraine.

The US has provided the most military assistance, supplying $29.3 billion from February 2022 to 3 February 2023, with a cumulative $41 billion to Ukraine as of 24 July 2023. (Note: On Tuesday 20 June 2023, the Pentagon disclosed it had made an accounting error when disbursing materiel from its stocks: In fiscal year 2022 (FY22) ending 30 Sep 2022, and in FY23 ending 30 Sep 2023, it had overestimated the value of the stocks, by using the replacement cost, rather than the book value of the presidential drawdown stocks. The error amounts to $6.2 billion which will be applied going forward. In FY22 the error was $2.6 billion, and in FY23 the error was $3.6 billion; the net result is that more materiel will be delivered to Ukraine going forward, as the funds have already been allocated.) To support Ukraine, many NATO members and allies, such as Germany and Sweden, have reversed past policies against providing offensive military aid. European Union (EU) nations as a bloc have provided €3.1 billion in military support, including lethal arms, to Ukraine. (Note: "Germany has authorized about $13 billion in support to Ukraine over the next nine to ten years. Norway has committed over $7 billion in support over five years. On June 19 [2023], Denmark announced $3.2 billion in funding over five years". —Laura Cooper, in testimony before the US House of Representatives) Bulgaria, a major manufacturer of Soviet-pattern weapons, has supplied Ukraine with more than €2 billion worth of arms and ammunition, including a third of the ammunition the Ukrainian military needed in the critical, early phase of the invasion; Bulgaria also provides fuel supplies, and at times has covered 40% of the Ukrainian armed forces' fuel needs.

Between 2014 and 2021, the UK, US, EU, and NATO provided mostly non-lethal military aid to Ukraine. Lethal aid to the country increased in 2018, when the US began to sell it weapons, including Javelin anti-tank missiles, and Ukraine agreed to purchase TB2 combat drones from Turkey in 2019.

In 2022, Russia massed equipment and troops on Ukraine's borders. In response, the US worked with other NATO member states to transfer US-produced weapons to Ukraine. The UK began to supply Ukraine with NLAW and Javelin anti-tank weapons. After the invasion, NATO member states including Germany agreed to supply weapons but NATO itself did not. NATO and its members also refused to send troops into Ukraine or to establish a no fly-zone in case this led to a larger-scale war.

In 2022, Congress approved more than $112 billion in aid to Ukraine. In October 2023, the Biden administration requested $61.4 billion more for Ukraine for the year ahead. On 20 April 2024, the U.S. House of Representatives approved a $95 billion aid package to Ukraine, Israel and Taiwan.

In April 2024, the Latvian government approved a new aid package for Ukraine in 2024, totaling EUR 9.6 million. The package consists of EUR 5.3 million allocated for Ukraine's reconstruction and an additional EUR 4.3 million designated to support the Ukrainian Armed Forces through the European Peace Facility.

=== Aid via drawdown from existing stocks ===
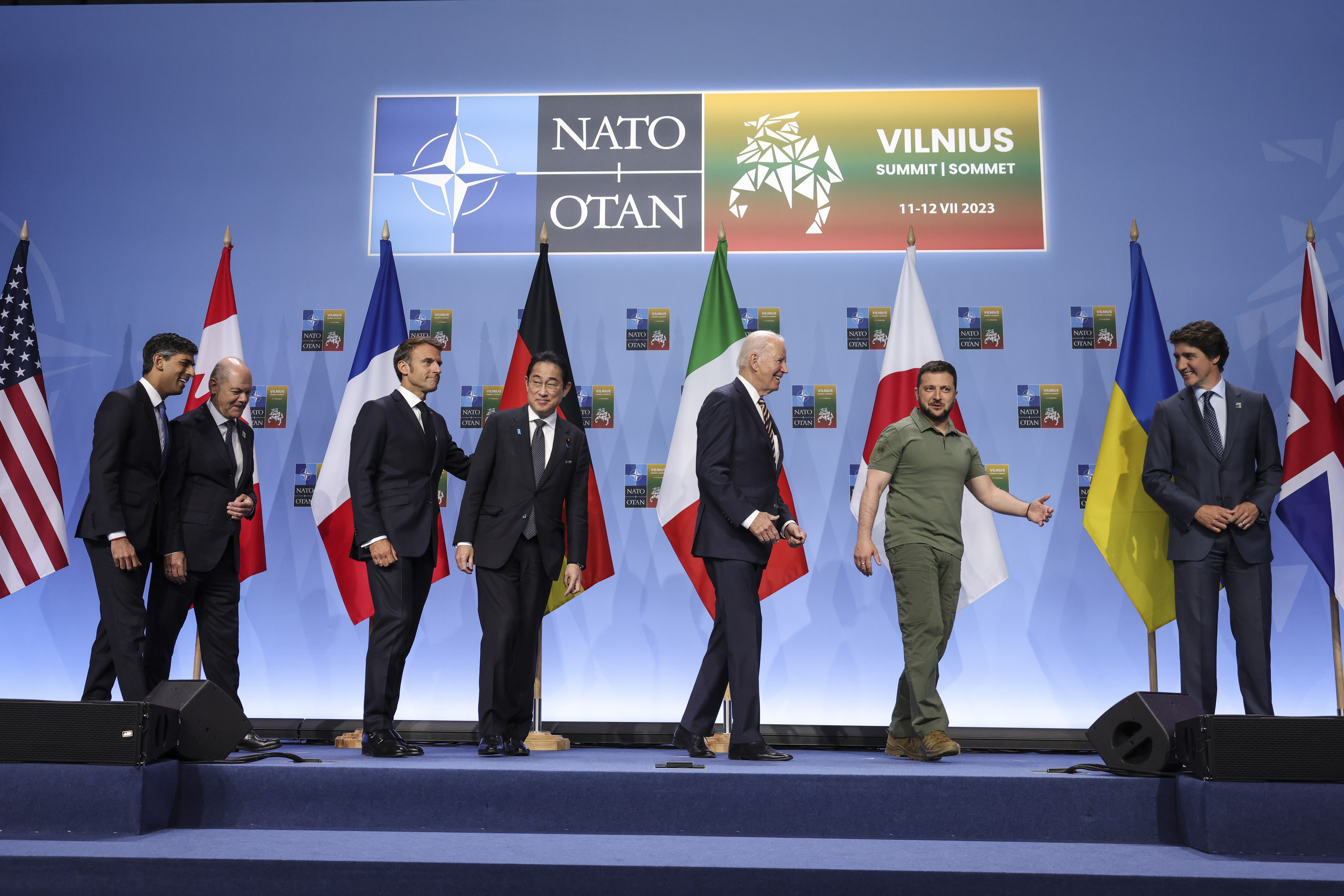
Ukrainian President Volodymyr Zelenskyy (second from right) at the NATO Summit in Vilnius on 12 July 2023

On 26 February 2022, US Secretary of State Antony Blinken announced $350 million in lethal military assistance, including anti-armor and anti-aircraft systems. The next day, the EU stated it would purchase €450 million (US$502 million) in lethal assistance and an additional €50 million ($56 million) in non-lethal supplies for Ukraine with Poland handling distribution. During the first week of the invasion, NATO member states supplied more than 17,000 anti-tank weapons to Ukraine; by mid-March, the number was estimated to be more than 20,000. In three tranches that were agreed in February, March and April 2022, the EU committed to €1.5 billion to support the capabilities and resilience of the Ukrainian Armed Forces and the protection of the Ukrainian civilian population under the purview of the European Peace Facility line.

As of 11 April 2022, the US and its allies had provided Ukraine with approximately 25,000 anti-aircraft and 60,000 anti-tank weapon systems. The following day, Russia received anti-tank missiles and RPGs from Iran, which were supplied through undercover networks via Iraq. On 19 April 2022, Romania announced a planned reform to the government decree that regulates the export of military weapons and national defense products to provide these weapons to Ukraine as well as NATO allies. The Romanian Ministry of Defense developed the draft decree stating the decision was made because of Russia's aggression against Ukraine. On 27 April, Defense Minister Vasile Dincu said his plan had been discontinued. On 26 April 2022, the US convened a conference in which representatives of more than 40 countries (Note: Denoted the Ukraine Contact Group and later, the Ukraine Defense Contact Group.) met at the Ramstein Air Base to discuss military support for Ukraine. On 28 April 2022, US President Joe Biden asked Congress for an additional $33 billion to assist Ukraine, including $20 billion to provide it with weapons. On 5 May, Ukraine's Prime Minister Denys Shmyhal announced Ukraine had received more than $12 billion worth of weapons and financial aid from Western countries since the start of Russia's invasion on 24 February. On 10 May, the United States House of Representatives passed legislation that would provide $40 billion in new aid to Ukraine. After the US Senate approved the legislation, Biden signed it into law on 21 May.

On 23 May 2022, US Secretary of Defense Lloyd Austin thanked Denmark for offering Harpoon missiles and launcher to Ukraine. By 15 June 2023 additional Harpoon missiles were en route to Ukraine.

On 30 May 2022, French Foreign Minister Catherine Colonna announced the supply of additional CAESAR self-propelled howitzer systems that were mounted on the Renault Sherpa 5 6×6 chassis. On 25 May, Commander-in-Chief of the Armed Forces of Ukraine Valerii Zaluzhnyi said that the first batch was already on the front lines fighting the invader. On 10 June, the AFU demonstrated the combat systems to representatives from the press; by that date the Ukrainian gunners possessed 18 CAESAR units. On 31 May 2022, the White House informed the press the US would be supplying M142 HIMARS multiple-launch rocket systems to Ukraine. Some analysts said HIMARS could be a "game-changer" in the war. Under Secretary of Defense for Policy Colin Kahl stated the US would be able to send more systems as the fighting evolved.

On 10 June 2022, an official from the Ukrainian military said they were using 5,000 to 6,000 artillery rounds a day and would then be using 155-calibre. NATO-standard shells because all of their Soviet-era guns had been destroyed. The official said the Russians had transformed the war into an artillery duel that focused on the southeast of Ukraine. On 12 June, a Ukrainian presidential advisor posted on social-media platform Twitter a list of weapons Ukraine needed to achieve "heavy weapons parity"; the top item was "1000 howitzers caliber 155 mm". Ukraine said it had enough 155 mm ammunition but lacked the artillery to use it. According to Oryxspioenkop, only 250 howitzers had been promised or delivered. On 13 June, a Deutsche Welle correspondent said the Ukrainian supply of Soviet-era ammunition had been exhausted and the country had only a dwindling supply obtained from friendly ex-Soviet countries. In June 2022 Germany declassified its list of military aid to Ukraine. As of July 2022, CNN reported recently declassified American intelligence suggested Iranians have given Russian forces Shahed 129 UAV combat drones.

By 2 August 2022, for the 16 US-supplied HIMARS systems in Ukraine, the US was providing more munitions—additional HIMARS rocket pods in monthly installments, as well as more 155-mm howitzer shells—at a cost of $550 million for the 17th Presidential drawdown package. The 18th US presidential drawdown package, which was released on 8 Aug 2022, was a $1 billion package including additional HIMARS rocket pods, 75,000 rounds of 155 mm artillery ammunition, 20 120 mm mortar systems and 20,000 rounds of 120 mm mortar ammunition, National Advanced Surface-to-Air Missile Systems (NASAMS), (Note: The first NASAMS is coming to Ukraine (17 October 2022), now that NASAMS training is nearly complete.) 1,000 Javelins and hundreds of AT4 anti-tank weapons, 50 armored medical treatment vehicles, Claymore mines, C4 explosives, and medical supplies. The 19th US presidential drawdown package on 19 Aug 2022 was a $775 million package that included additional HIMARS rocket pods; 16 105 mm howitzers with 36,000 artillery rounds to supplement the UK's past contributions of 105 mm howitzers; 1,000 anti-armor Javelins; 2,000 anti-armor rounds for the Swedish Carl Gustaf 8.4 cm recoilless rifle; 1,500 tube-launched, optically tracked, wire-guided, anti-tank missiles (BGM-71 TOWs); additional AGM-88 HARM air-launched anti-radiation missiles that home on radar sites; 15 ScanEagle UAVs to guide Ukrainian artillery; 40 mine flail vehicles to clear out minefields; 50 HMMWVs, tactical secure communication systems; demolition munitions; night vision devices; thermal imagery systems; optics; and laser rangefinders. Since 2021, the packages totaled $10.7 billion by 19 August 2022.

In September 2022, 800 combat drones manufactured by the Taiwanese DronesVision were transferred to Ukraine through Poland. In November 2022, the UK announced it was donating to Ukraine three former Royal Navy and Royal Air Force Sea King helicopters .

The Institute for the Study of War has assessed the need for Western supplies was apparent in June 2022 and that, if commitments and preparations for delivery had been made at that time, Ukraine would have been ready to deploy the materiel in November or December 2022. Western nations committed to the delivery of tanks in January 2023. Ukraine was unable to take advantage of Russian military depletion and disorganization following the successful Ukrainian counter-offenses at Kharkiv and Kherson in late 2022 due in part to the need to conserve limited stocks of Soviet equipment and in the absence of an expectation of Western replacements. This delay allowed Russia to reorganize and reinforce its armed forces, potentially prolonging the war.

=== United States' Ukraine security assistance package ===
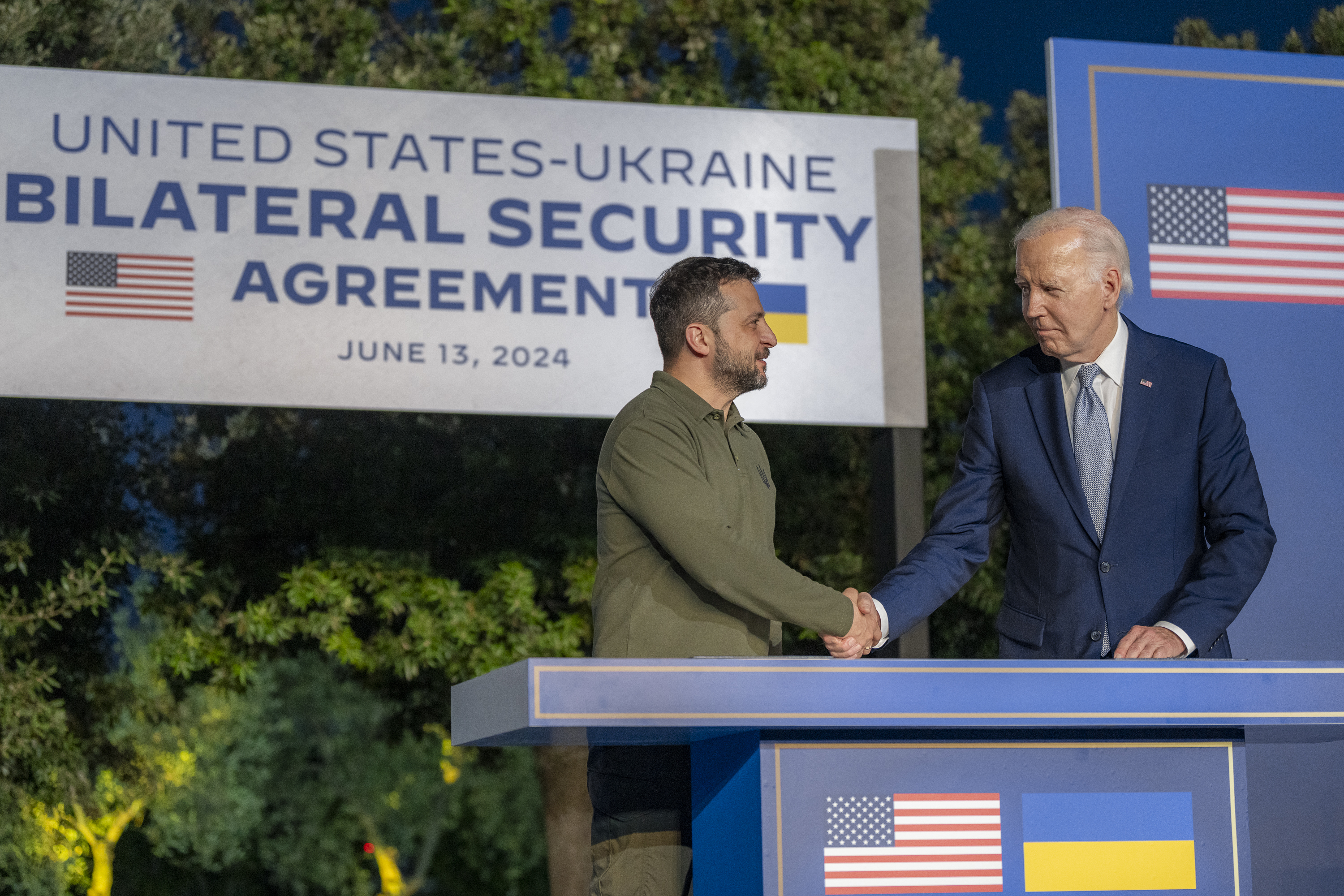
US President Joe Biden and Ukrainian President Volodymyr Zelenskyy at the G7 summit in Italy, 13 June 2024

On 24 August 2022, US President Joe Biden announced $3 billion in aid for longer-term requirements by Ukraine, it was the largest aid package since the beginning of the Russian invasion. The money was released from a congressional funding source (Ukraine Security Assistance Initiative (USAI)) to allow the US government to procure weapons from industry, including NASAMS air defense units, Puma drones, and Vampire counter-drone missiles. The Vampire contract was not yet let as of November 2022, with delivery to Ukraine after mid-2023. The longer-term deliveries of materiel included six additional NASAMS air-defense units and their attendant rounds for a total of eight units; up to 245,000 155 mm howitzer shells; up to 65,000 120 mm mortar rounds; up to 24 counter-battery radars, and the attendant training, maintenance, and sustainment. By 24 August 2022, US aid since January 2021 exceeded $13.5 billion. On 25 August 2022, President Zelenskyy thanked President Biden for the $3 billion USAI security aid package he announced the previous day, and the $3 billion World Bank financial-aid package for Ukraine. On September 2, Biden requested from Congress $13.7 billion "for equipment, intelligence support and direct budgetary support" to Ukraine.

By August 2022, the United Kingdom had provided military aid to the value of £2.3bn ($2.8bn). This included three M270 Multiple Launch Rocket Systems, some 5,000 NLAW anti-tank missiles, "hundreds" of Brimstone missiles, 120 armoured vehicles including Mastiff Protected Patrol Vehicles, and heavy-lift drones. Additionally, 10,000 Ukrainian soldiers were in an intensive, 120-day infantry training course at four bases in the UK.

On 8 September 2022, US Secretary of State Antony Blinken announced $2 billion in aid to Ukraine and eighteen partners in the defense industrial base. In addition, US Secretary of Defense Lloyd J. Austin III announced the 20th drawdown package; up to $675 million for Ukraine military aid at the fifth Ukraine Defense Contact Group meeting in Germany, and a discussion of initiatives for the respective industrial bases of the Defense Contact Group, for the long-term defense of Ukraine's sovereign territory. On 28 September, William LaPlante, US Under Secretary of Defense for Acquisition and Sustainment (USD (A&S)), met in Brussels with 40 counterparts in the Ukraine Defense Contact Group. On the agenda was the identification of industrial suppliers of replacement materiel such as gun barrels, ball bearings, steel casings, and microchips, without which the existing military aid will eventually cease to function due to heavy use on the battlefield. LaPlante later noted a policy of "interoperability, but interchangeability, with multiple plants in multiple countries making identical items" will have a deterrent effect on those countries' adversaries and on those of Ukraine. Arms suppliers from Eastern Europe were also arming Ukraine using Ukraine Defense Contacts. On 15 September 2022, Biden announced his 21st drawdown package, which was worth $600 million in military aid to Ukraine in light of the 2022 Kharkiv counteroffensive.

On 28 September 2022, the US Department of Defense announced a Ukraine Security Assistance Initiative (USAI) package worth up to $1.1 billion, which would purchase 18 additional HIMARS systems and their associated rockets from vendors in the future. By 28 September, 16 HIMARS systems drawn from the US and another 10 equivalent systems from the allies were in service in Ukraine. This USAI package was also to include 150 High Mobility Multipurpose Wheeled Vehicles (Humvees or HMMWVs), 150 tactical vehicles, 20 multi-mission radars, explosive ordnance disposal equipment, body armor and tactical secure communications systems, surveillance systems, and optics. This long-term package also included training for Ukrainian troops, maintenance, and sustainment, totaling $16.2 billion in aid since the beginning of the 2022 invasion.

On 20 February 2023, during an unexpected visit to Kyiv, US President Biden announced a half-billion dollar aid package for Ukraine, including artillery ammunition, more FGM-148 Javelins, and howitzers. As of September 2023, US Security aid to Ukraine since Russia's full-scale invasion in February 2022 had exceeded $43 billion.

On 11 October 2023, following U.S. budget funding difficulty for 2024 in the United States House of Representatives and the removal of its speaker, U.S. National Security Council spokesman John Kirby said support provided to Ukraine was not going to be indefinite. Funding was now on a short-term continuing resolution. Kirby said: "on the Ukraine funding, we're coming near to the end of the rope ... today we announced $200 million, and we'll keep that aid going as long as we can, but it's not going to be indefinite". The administration was in discussions with members of Congress about additional funding for Ukraine.

==== Lend-Lease for Ukraine ====
On 1 October 2022 Lend-Lease for Ukraine came into effect. (Note: First day of the fiscal year of the US government.) A proposal to administer US security assistance as part of EUCOM was under consideration at The Pentagon. This plan would systematize the services currently being provided to Ukraine on an ad hoc basis, and would provide a long-term vehicle for countering Russian plans under the provisions of the Lend-Lease act, and for coordinating Allied aid for Ukraine's defense with Ukrainian requests at a single point of contact in Wiesbaden, Germany.

On 4 October 2022, the 22nd presidential drawdown from US stocks to Ukraine, $625 million in security assistance, included a tailored package consisting of four more HIMARS systems and their associated rockets; 16 more M777 155 mm howitzers and 75,000 155 mm rounds; 500 M982 Excalibur precision-guided 155 mm rounds; 1,000 155 mm rounds of remote anti-armor mine systems; 16 more 105 mm M119 howitzers; 30,000 120 mm mortar rounds; 200 mine-resistant, ambush-protected vehicles (MRAPs); 200,000 rounds of small arms ammunition; and Claymore mines. The package responded to Ukrainian ammunition-consumption rates during their latest offensives; according to Laura Cooper, a US DoD deputy assistant secretary of defense, more aid would be forthcoming . So far, the security assistance to Ukraine had totalled $16.8 billion to Ukraine.

On 14 October 2022, the 23rd presidential drawdown from US stocks provided Ukraine $725 million in security assistance, including additional rounds for high-mobility artillery rocket systems (HIMARS), 23,000 155 mm howitzer rounds, 500 precision-guided 155 mm artillery rounds, 5,000 155 mm rounds of remote anti-armor mine (RAAM) systems, 5,000 anti-tank weapons, high-speed anti-radiation missiles (HARMs), more than 200 HMMWVs; small arms and more than 2,000,000 rounds of small-arms ammunition, and medical supplies. The security assistance to Ukraine since January 2021 had totalled $18.2 billion.

On 31 January 2023, Reuters reported the US presidential drawdown authority had allocated more than $400 million in materiel, including a new weapon, the GLSDB available under USAI. On 3 February 2023, another presidential drawdown package was announced. The package included additional ammunition for HiMARS, 155 mm artillery rounds, and 120 mm mortar rounds; 190 heavy machine guns with thermal imagery sights and associated ammunition to counter unmanned aerial systems; 181 Mine Resistant Ambush Protected vehicles; 250 Javelin anti-armor systems; 2,000 anti-armor rockets; Claymore anti-personnel munitions; demolition munitions; and cold-weather equipment, helmets, and other field equipment.

=== Proposal for a Kyiv Security Compact ===
In September 2022, former NATO Secretary General Anders Fogh Rasmussen delivered a proposal for a long-lasting Kyiv Security Compact to Ukraine's President Volodymyr Zelenskyy; the proposed compact involved legally binding security guarantees for Ukraine from a coalition of Western countries to bolster its ability to repel Russian attacks through extensive joint training, the provision of advanced defensive weapons systems, and support to develop the country's defense industry.

=== Aid in construction of a missile defense system ===
Missile-defense systems arrived in Ukraine piecemeal; (Note: After the 8 October Crimean Bridge explosion, Ukraine suffered widespread missile attacks (10 October 2022). Russia made over 190 strikes in 12 days.) in Brussels on 12 October 2022, US Army General Mark Milley suggested to the Ukraine Defense Contact Group the allies of Ukraine "chip in to help Ukraine rebuild and sustain an integrated air and missile defense system" from the contributed air-and-missile defense-system materiel. Ukraine would need to link together and integrate its existing materiel and radars with "command and control and communication systems". (Note: On 31 October 2022 Ukraine intercepted 45 missiles out of 55 fired.)

On 12 October 2022, German Defense Minister Christine Lambrecht announced an IRIS-T air-defense system had arrived in Ukraine, with three more forthcoming in 2023. On 28 October, The Pentagon announced the 24th presidential drawdown of materiel worth $275 million; the security assistance totalled $18.5 billion to Ukraine since January 2021. The aid included 500 Excalibur precision-guided 155 mm artillery rounds, 2,000 155 mm remote anti-armor mine systems, more than 1,300 anti-armor weapons, more than 2.75 million rounds of small-arms ammunition, more HIMARS rockets, 125 Humvees, and four satellite-communications antennas for Ukraine's command and control systems, as well as training for operation of the NASAMS units. Two NASAMS units arrived in Ukraine on 7 November 2022. (Note: As of 16 November 2022 the NASAMS had a 100% kill rate against their targets.)

=== Security Assistance Group Ukraine (SAGU) ===
By 21 July 2022, the United States European Command (EUCOM) Control Center-Ukraine/International Donor Coordination Centre (ECCU/IDCC), a joint cell that was formed in March 2022, had trained 1,500 Ukrainian Armed Forces personnel on coalition-donated equipment. By 4 November 2022, the equipment shipments and training measures of the Ukraine Contact Group had become repeatable enough to systematize in a Security Assistance Group Ukraine (SAGU), which was based in Wiesbaden, Germany.

On 4 November 2022, the Pentagon announced a $400 million Ukraine Security Assistance Initiative (USAI) security assistance package to refurbish 45 T-72 tanks from the Czech Republic with "advanced optics, communications and armor packages"; the package also included 1,100 Phoenix Ghost tactical unmanned aerial systems (UASs) and 40 armored riverine boats. The combined additional aid amounted to 90 more T-72s by year-end 2022, 250 M1117 armored security vehicles furnished for the first time, and refurbished HAWK missiles from the Czech Republic that will serve on the HAWK launchers from Spain. On 10 November, the $400-million aid announcement was clarified; four Stinger-based air defense AN/TWQ-1 Avengers to counter the Iranian drones were provided to Ukraine for the first time, as were additional HIMARS rockets, 10,000 mortar rounds, thousands of 155 mm howitzer rounds, 400 grenade launchers, 100 Humvees, 20 million rounds of small-arms ammunition, and cold-weather gear. In November 2022, the 20 HIMARS launchers drawn from US stocks were still in service; Poland and other countried had provided hundreds of T-72s; the USAI security assistance totalled $18.9 billion to Ukraine since January 2021.

On 15 November 2022, the US White House Office of Management and Budget asked Congress for an additional $38 billion for aid to Ukraine in fiscal year 2023. The supplemental funding request included $21.7 billion in security assistance, $14.5 billion in US State Department sources and USAID sources to be provided to Ukraine's government, humanitarian relief and global food security, and a $900 million request for the Department of Health and Human Services to "provide standard assistance health care and support services to Ukrainian parolees". In addition, a $626 million United States Department of Energy request would aid nuclear security at the power plant in Zaporizhzhia. The White House also requested Congress to grant $7 billion in additional presidential drawdown authority from existing Defense Department materiel. If Congress was to grant this fourth request, the total aid to Ukraine would be $104 billion in less than a year.

On 17 November 2022, it was reported Israel had approved the transfer of weapons systems with Israeli parts via NATO countries, including the UK. These included advanced fire-control and electro-optic systems. It also agreed to buy strategic materials for the Ukrainian armed forces.

On 23 November 2022 the Pentagon announced its 26th drawdown package of up to $400 million in aid, consisting of HIMARS rockets, AGM-88 high-speed anti-radiation missiles, 200 precision-guided 155 mm artillery M982 Excalibur rounds, 150 heavy machine guns to shoot down drones, additional NASAMS missiles for air defense, 150 Humvees, over 100 additional light tactical vehicles, over 200 electrical generators, 20 million rounds of small-arms ammunition, and spare parts for 105 mm howitzers.

On 9 December 2022, the Pentagon announced the US president had authorized the 27th drawdown package of up to $275 million in aid to Ukraine for additional HIMARS rockets, 80,000 155 mm artillery rounds, counter-unmanned aerial systems (UASs), counter-air defense equipment, Humvees, ambulances and medical equipment, nearly 150 generators, and field equipment.

On 21 December 2022, Antony Blinken of the US State Department announced the 28th drawdown of aid for Ukraine, a $1 billion package consisting of a Patriot missile battery: (Note: #Ukraine's air and missile defense system options include: MIM-104 Patriot battery, HAWKs, NASAMS, Iris-T, Thales air defence) the Pentagon also announced $850 million of security assistance for Ukraine under its Ukraine Security Assistance Initiative. Training in the use of these Patriot missiles will be required for Ukraine's troops. The materiel also included:

- JDAM kits for precision aerial munitions
- ammunition for HIMARS High Mobility Artillery Rocket Systems
- 500 precision-guided 155 mm artillery rounds
- 10 120 mm mortar systems and 10,000 120 mm mortar rounds
- 10 82 mm mortar systems
- 10 60 mm mortar systems
- 37 Cougar Mine Resistant Ambush Protected vehicles (MRAPs)
- 120 High Mobility Multipurpose Wheeled Vehicles (Humvees)
- six armored utility trucks
- high-speed anti-radiation missiles
- 2,700 grenade launchers and small arms
- Claymore anti-personnel munitions
- demolition munitions and equipment
- night-vision devices and optics
- tactical secure communications systems and
- body armor and other field equipment.

The USAI (from industry rather than from United States Department of Defense stocks) were:

- 45,000 152 mm artillery rounds
- 20,000 122 mm artillery rounds
- 50,000 122 mm GRAD rockets
- 100,000 rounds of 125 mm tank ammunition
- satellite communications terminals and services, and
- funding for training, maintenance and sustainment.

On 6 January 2023, Chancellor Scholz and President Biden announced the contribution of Marder and Bradley armored fighting vehicles from Germany and the US, respectively; President Macron had announced France's contribution of AMX-10 RC armored fighting vehicles two days earlier. About 50 Bradley Fighting Vehicles were in the US drawdown package; several dozen AMX-10s were available from France. The 29th US drawdown amounted to $2.85 billion in aid; the US aid package and provided $200 million in foreign military financing for Ukraine. The Bradley package included 50 MRAPs, 138 Humvees, 500 TOW missiles, and 250,000 rounds of 25 mm ammunition. The US also announced the contribution of 18 Paladin self-propelled 155 mm howitzers for the first time as well as 100 additional M113 armored personnel carriers and 70,000 additional 155 mm howitzer rounds. The package also included 4,000 Zuni rockets to be fired from Ukrainian aircraft and RIM-7 missiles modified to be fired from Ukrainian Buk launchers.

Scholz also announced a German Patriot missile battery would go to Ukraine in a billion-dollar package. as well as 40 Marder vehicles. On 17 January 2023, Netherlands Prime Minister Mark Rutte announced he would send Patriot missile launchers to Ukraine, the third country to donate Patriots; two launchers arrived in April 2023.

=== Swiss blocks on military exports to Ukraine ===
In mid 2022, Switzerland vetoed Denmark's request to send Swiss-made Piranha III armored vehicles to Ukraine. Switzerland requires countries that purchase Swiss arms to request permission to re-export them. Switzerland has also vetoed German requests to donate tank munitions to Ukraine. Switzerland has also vetoed Poland's, Spain's and other countries' requests.

=== Additional military provisions for Ukraine ===
On 17 October 2022 the European Union approved €500 million ($486 million) in weapons for Ukraine, and a two-year training mission initially under the command of France's Vice Admiral Hervé Bléjean for 15,000 Ukrainian troops. The training would be held in Germany and Poland, and would be open to other nations. The planned training cost was nearly €107 million. The EU doubled the training commitment to 30,000 troops.

On 11 January 2023, Poland announced it would provide a company of 12 Leopard 2 tanks (Note: The US Abrams' lightest tanks weigh in at 60 tons, some 15 tons heavier than the weight limits of European roads and bridges. The latest Abrams versions are 74 tons. European rivers are wider than the span of Joint Assault Bridges. Thus specialized bridging operations must be designed by military engineers, case-by-case. Rasputitsa will defeat even the indigenous European armour. Thus military campaigns in Europe are dependent on individual weather conditions.) to Ukraine; on 14 January 2023, the United Kingdom announced it would give Ukraine 14 Challenger 2 tanks, compared to the 4 November 2022 entry in which 90 T-72 tanks were being refurbished by Czech suppliers, with estimated delivery by year-end 2022. Lt. Gen. (Retired) Ben Hodges assessed the contributions up to January 2023 as the equivalent of an armored brigade. (Note: In US terms, an §Armored brigade combat team (ABCT). Note by US Army doctrine 45 armed § M113s, Humvees and supply trucks for refuel and re-armament would be included. An ABCT would consist of two armored battalions (at 58 tanks apiece), as well as an infantry battalion, and a reconnaissance squadron. This organization would support § combined arms maneuver.) Hodges said an armored division was the goal; (Note: Compare to Ukraine's request for 300 tanks.) the 11 January aid being:

- 26 Czech Dana M2 self-propelled howitzers
- 18 US Paladin self-propelled howitzers
- 30 UK AS-90 self-propelled guns
- and unspecified number of French AMX-10 RC armored reconnaissance vehicles
- 40 German Marder infantry fighting vehicles (IFVs)
- 50 US Bradley IFVs (Note: In combined arms armour and infantry do not fight alone; rather armour, infantry, artillery, logistics, aviation, and reconnaissance operate in concert, each branch working to support and protect the other branches, as a combined team of teams, by US Army doctrine.)
- 14 Challenger 2 tanks
- 12 Leopard 2 tanks, and
- 90 T-72 tanks.

The eighth meeting of the Ukraine Defense Contact Group gathered at Ramstein, Germany, on 18–20 January 2023, where the new German defense minister was introduced to the group. Nine countries pledged support:

- Canada pledged to supply Ukraine with 200 Canadian APCs, National Advanced Surface-to-Air Missile System (NASAMS), 39 other armoured support vehicles, anti-tank weapons, and M777 howitzers. Canada was ranked fifth by materiel volume behind Poland, Germany, the UK, and the US.
- Czech Republic pledged to increase industrial production for large-caliber munitions, howitzers, and APCs
- Denmark pledged training worth €600 million for Ukrainian soldiers
- Estonia pleadged an unspecified quantity of 155 mm FH-70 and 122 mm D-30 howitzers, thousands of 155 mm artillery ammunition rounds, support vehicles, Carl-Gustaf M2 anti-tank grenade launchers with ammunition rounds worth €113 million, and training for Ukrainian soldiers
- Latvia pledged tens of MANPADS Stingers, two M-17 helicopters, tens of UAVs, spare parts for M109 howitzers, and training for 2,000 Ukrainian soldiers
- Lithuania pledged a support package worth €125 million, two Mi-8 helicopters worth €85 million, counter-drones, optics, thermo-visual devices, and drones worth €40 million, and a €2 million donation to UK international fund for heavy weaponry
- Poland pledged S-60 anti-aircraft guns with 70,000 pieces of ammunition; it had already donated 42 infantry fighting vehicles, training packages for two mechanized battalions, more 155 mm Krab howitzers, and ammunition
- Slovakia pledged to Increase production of howitzers, de-mining equipment and ammunition, and to provide training for Ukrainian soldiers
- The UK's largest aid package thus far included 14 Challenger 2 tanks, 30 AS-90 self-propelled guns, Bulldog APCs, breachers, bridgelayers, dozens of drones, 100,000 artillery rounds, Starstreak air-defense missiles, GMLRS ammunition, 600 Brimstone anti-tank munitions, and training for Ukrainian troops to operate this materiel.
- On 19 January 2023, the US announced a contribution of $2.5 billion more in aid; this package included
  - 90 Stryker APCs
  - 59 more Bradley IFVs for more than 109 IFVs in January 2023
  - More rockets for NASAMS
  - eight Avenger air-defense systems
  - 295,000 25 mm rounds for Bradley IFVs
  - 53 MRAPs
  - 350 Humvees
  - 20,000 155 mm artillery rounds (Note: By early September 2022 the US had given 126 M777 howitzer cannons and over 800,000 rounds of 155 mm ammunition for them. By January 2023 the US had donated 250,000 more 155 mm shells to Ukraine. The US was producing 14,000 155 mm shells monthly and planned to increase production to 90,000 shells per month by 2025.)
  - 600 precision guided munitions
  - 95,000 105 mm artillery rounds
  - 11,800 120 mm mortar rounds
  - additional GMLRS (for HIMARS)
  - 12 ammunition support vehicles
  - 6 command-post vehicles
  - 22 tactical vehicles to tow weapons
  - additional High-speed Anti-radiation missiles (HARMs)
  - 2,000 anti-armor rockets
  - more than 3 million rounds of small arms ammunition
  - demolition equipment for obstacle clearing
  - Claymore mines
  - night-vision devices, and
  - spare parts and other field equipment
- Germany: see § Germany's entry in the list of foreign aid to Ukraine during the Russo-Ukrainian War
- France pledged 12 more Caesar truck-mounted artillery guns from Nexter on 2 February 2023
- Unattributed nations (likely Netherlands and Belgium) have provided hundreds of Armored Infantry Fighting Vehicles (AIFVs) to Ukraine.

=== Additional tanks for Ukraine ===
In contrast to attrition warfare, in which tanks are often used as fire support, a potential switch to maneuver warfare is assumed to require tanks. (Note: "How would you use the tanks?": Four factors on 21st century warfare— MG Chip Chapman: Control of the air, shock action, surprise, and offensive reconnaissance) Although Poland and Finland had separately agreed to send Ukraine 12 Leopard 2 tanks each, Germany must agree to license their transfer. US Secretary Austin has met with Germany's Defence Minister Pistorius on securing Leopard 2 tanks for Ukraine. As of 22 January 2023, Germany would not block the export of Leopard 2 tanks by other contact-group nations.

On 20 January 2023, the Netherlands offered F-16s and Leopard 2s. The offers were conditional on mutual agreements by multiple nations; Germany will not block the export of Leopard 2s (by Poland, Finland, Denmark, Netherlands) to Ukraine. Poland had requested approval to export Leopard 2s to Ukraine. On 25 January 2023, the US agreed to send tanks to Ukraine under the auspices of the USAI in a $400 million package; 31 M1 Abrams tanks—an entire Ukraine tank battalion— and eight M88 Recovery Vehicles would not arrive in Ukraine for months. (Note: The US is attempting to get Abrams tanks to Ukraine earlier, perhaps by August 2023.)

Germany also agreed to send more than 12 Leopard 2s to Ukraine, and to support the donation with ammunition and training in Germany. Germany also agreed to approve the re-export of Leopard 2s from other nations to Ukraine. The goal was to send 80 Leopard 2s to Ukraine. By 25 January 2023, the list of nations willing to send tanks to Ukraine had grown. (Note: France—Leclercs, UK—14 Challenger 2s, US—31 Abrams M1A2, Canada—4 Leopard 2s, Germany— 112 Leopard 2s (eventually 2 battalions (some 88 tanks) plus 14 2A6s immediately), Poland—14 Leopard 2A4s, Finland—14 Leopard 2 A4/A6s, Denmark—6 Leopard 2A5/A7s, Netherlands—18 Leopard 2A6s, Norway—8 Leopard 2A4s, Portugal—4 Leopard 2A6s, and Spain— 20-53 Leopard 2A4s (20 are in good condition, the remainder need repair) respectively).) On 23 February, Finland announced its contribution would include three pieces of Leopard 2 mine-clearing tanks built on the Leopard 2A4 platform.

On 7 February 2023, the European community determined industrial manufacturers held 178 Leopard 1 tanks that could be refurbished and provided to Ukraine, with 20-25 Leopard 1A5 tanks available in 2023. The remainder could be delivered in 2024, assuming Germany, the Netherlands, and Denmark fund them. (Note: Given that sufficient materiel for a decisive result depends on industrial capacity, which takes time to develop, in a February 2023 RAND briefing, RAND projected a violent battle in several months, and a return to a grinding war of attrition.)

On 24 February 2023, Poland delivered four Leopard 2A4 tanks to Ukraine, 10 more are to arrive by 9 March 2023; Sweden has announced it intended to donate up to 10 Leopard 2A5 tanks. When marshaled, the contributions from Poland, Canada, Norway, and Spain suffice to field a battalion of Leopard 2A4s. Poland also gave Ukraine 60 PT-91 tanks. On 22 April 2023, six Leopard 2A4s and 20 heavy armored transport vehicles were en route from Spain to Ukraine; the sea-borne part of the route would take six days. Spain also trained 40 tank crew members and 15 mechanics from Ukraine. On 20 April 2023, Netherlands and Denmark announced a joint contribution of 14 restored Leopard 2A4 tanks to Ukraine for early 2024. Over the next year, Ukraine will be receiving 85 2A4s.

As of 21 April 2023, the coalition had provided more than 230 tanks and more than 1,550 armored vehicles. On 20 September 2023, the Germany's federal government updated its list of military support for Ukraine from which materiel is supplied, and from which the supplies of the German military are replenished. The updates included spare parts for MCT WISENT 1, which are tanks with mine-clearing capability, as well as four additional HX81 trucks and trailers and 12 additional Mercedes-Benz Zetros.

Ten M1A1 Abrams tanks arrived in Ukraine on 25 September 2023, armed with heavy, dense armor-piercing 120 mm shells made of depleted uranium, to be followed by 21 more as part of the 46th drawdown package from the US. The tank battalion will likely be held in reserve in undisclosed locations until its use can be decisive (rather than dissipated in full frontal assaults). The M1A1 Abrams tanks appear to be committed to the defence of Avdiivka as of 23 February 2024.

=== Training in combined arms operations ===
By January 2023, battalion-level training in combined arms (Note: The precise role of tanks is maneuver: moving rapidly, supported by infantry, artillery, and air cover/air defense —Hamish de Bretton Gordon) maneuver for Ukraine was underway. By mid-2023, 2,000 Ukrainian soldiers would be trained in France; in Poland, 150 additional French instructors would augment the training of 600 Ukrainian soldiers per month—up from 280 soldiers per month. Similar training came from Canada, (Note: Canada has been training Ukraine's troops since 2016.) Denmark, Estonia, Latvia, Poland, Slovakia, Germany, the UK, and the US. The EU doubled its training commitment to 30,000 troops. In February, a battalion of Ukrainian troops completed five weeks of unit training in combined arms in Germany. Training of the experienced Ukrainian tankers could take a third to a half the time needed for conscripted troops, estimated Lt. Gen. (Retired) Ben Hodges.To reach a state of readiness, maintenance of the donated Leopard 2 tanks would take weeks. The troops could be ready by March 2023.

As of February 2023, the US was planning a HIMARS training center in Europe.

US troops have trained more than 7,000 Ukrainian soldiers as of 31 March 2023; overall, 26 nations are currently training more than 11,000 Ukrainian soldiers. As of 21 April, more than 11,000 Ukrainian soldiers were in training or had finished courses in Germany; an additional 2,250 Ukrainian soldiers (four motorized infantry battalions) were undertaking combined-arms training in Germany. As of 21 April 2023 the US had trained seven mechanized Ukrainian battalions, three Stryker fighting vehicle battalions, three Bradley fighting vehicle battalions, and one motorized infantry battalion. By 21 April, another motorized infantry battalion had arrived in Germany for training. An armored battalion of 31 M1A1 Abrams tanks arrived in Germany in mid-May. The tanks were for training a Ukraine tank battalion of 250 soldiers; these tanks will not be going to Ukraine but another 31 M1A1s were being refurbished for Ukraine and would arrive there by late 2023.

By 9 June 2023, the training in combined-arms operations, which involves the repair of armoured vehicles, was demonstrated during the June counteroffensive. Ukrainian troops used night-vision goggles to gain a relative advantage over the Russian troops, and used Remote Anti-Armor Mine Systems to mine the roads between first and second Russian lines of defense.

By 18 July 2023 the Ukraine Defense Contact Group (UDCG) "[had] trained 17 brigade combat teams, 63,000 Ukrainian troops, and training continues", according to Gen. Mark Milley.

Oleksii Reznikov called for the training of sappers because Ukraine has become the most-heavily mined country in the world.

=== Ukraine's air and missile defense ===
As of 14 February 2023, to help better defend against Russia's missile attacks, Ukraine's air-defense capabilities included equipment to integrate Western air-defense launchers, missiles, and radars with Ukraine's air-defense systems. These consisted of:

- four air surveillance radars
- two Patriot batteries;
- HAWK air-defense launchers
- satellite communications terminals and services
- IRIS-T systems from Germany
- a medium-range SAMP/T from France
- Ukraine's S-300s and MANPADs (including Starstreaks and FIM-92 Stingers)
- AN/TPQ-36 and AN/TPQ-53 radars already in Ukraine's inventory as Counter-battery radars; NASAMS systems (at least 3, with 6 more coming)
- AN/TWQ-1 Avengers
- 340 heavy machine guns with thermal imagery sights and associated ammunition.

On 2 February 2023, France and Ukraine announced a complete medium-range air defense system. (an Aster 30 Block 1NT SAMP/T system)

On 3 February 2023, concurrent with a $400 million drawdown package, the USAI authority announced additional air-and-missile-defense capability for Ukraine; the package authorized up to $1.725 billion in materiel. Under USAI, the United States Department of Defense would provide Ukraine with:

- Two HAWK air defense firing units;
- Anti-aircraft guns and ammunition;
- Equipment to integrate Western air defense launchers, missiles and radars with Ukraine's air defense systems;
- Equipment to sustain Ukraine's existing air defense capabilities;
- Air defense generators;
- Counter-unmanned aerial systems;
- Four air surveillance radars;
- 20 counter-mortar radars;
- Spare parts for counter-artillery radars;
- AeroVironment RQ-20 Puma unmanned aerial systems;
- Precision-guided rockets;
- Secure communications equipment;
- Medical supplies, and
- funding for training, maintenance, and sustainment.

By 3 February 2023, US aid to Ukraine since January 2021 exceeded $29.3 billion; since 2014 US aid to Ukraine has exceeded $32 billion. French industrial aid to Ukraine's air defense was funded by a €200-million line designed by France for this purpose, having drawn half the fund so far.

A new weapon, the Ground Launched Small Diameter Bomb (GLSDB) was proposed for Ukraine in November 2022. GLSDB has a range of 150 km (93 miles) and is funded by USAI. As the $2.17 billion package includes a USAI component, that USAI component was not immediately available. GLSDB passed its tests and could show up in Ukraine's inventory as early as 31 January 2024.

Canada and seventeen European nations have agreed to share intelligence, surveillance, and reconnaissance (ISR) data which is to be gathered by satellites under the Allied Persistent Surveillance from Space Initiative (APSS). A letter of intent for APSS was signed in Brussels on 15 February 2023; APSS begins operations in 2025. The US National Geospatial-Intelligence Agency (NGA) and the National Reconnaissance Office (NRO) had urged commercial satellite firms to provide ISR data to Ukraine.

On 24 February 2023, the US Department of Defense announced a USAI package for Ukraine worth $2 billion: additional Unmanned Aerial Systems (UAS), as well as counter-UASs (counter-drones); additional HIMARS ammunition; additional 155 mm artillery ammunition; Mine clearing equipment; Secure communications support equipment; and Funding for training, maintenance, and sustainment. This signifies the beginning of a contracting process with the US defense industrial base rather than the previous drawdowns from materiel stocks. The US and multiple European nations are providing §training in combined arms operations for Ukraine, in order to better use the aid being supplied in the future.

In December 2022, NATO planning for the western flank of the NATO alliance had 8 battlegroup-sized Rapid Reaction Forces stationed in Estonia, Latvia, Lithuania, Poland, Slovakia, Hungary, Romania, and Bulgaria (listed north to south). NATO planners alerted the member nations that up to 300,000 troops could be deployed to the western flank, in a 30-day period. On 17 March 2023, the European Defence Agency agreed to sponsor the EU countries, as well as Norway in a cooperative agreement to provide one million 155 mm artillery shells to Ukraine. (Note: The 17 March 2023 pledge of one million 155 mm artillery shells to Ukraine has three parts 1) €1 billion to EU bloc members for the shells they donate from their stock; 2) €1 billion to fund EU states and Norway for manufacture of 155 mm shells; and 3) direct funding of investment in factories that manufacture these munitions. It is the 3rd provision that prioritises the allocation of critical materials to manufacturing processes, which is alarming some European manufacturers. In December 2023 Rheinmetall received an order for tens of thousands of 155 mm artillery shells destined for Ukraine. Shells from this order will be produced in Spain; the shells in this order begin delivery to Ukraine by 2025. Earlier orders from October 2023 include 150,000 155 mm Rheinmetall shells destined for Germany; In 2024, Rheinmetall plans to significantly increase its production capacity in Spain, Germany, South Africa and Australia, for an annual production capacity of 700,000 155 mm shells. As of 6 December 2023, six EU countries have ordered 60,000 shells for Ukraine under the EU manufacturing agreement. Globally, defense spending jumped in 2023 in response to the Russian invasion of Ukraine.)

On 20 March 2023, the Pentagon announced its 34th drawdown for Ukraine since August 2021, valued at up to $350 million, including HIMARS rockets, 155 mm artillery shells, and 25 mm rounds.

On 4 April 2023, the Pentagon announced up to $500 million in aid to Ukraine: Additional munitions for Patriot air defense systems;

- Additional ammunition for High Mobility Artillery Rocket Systems;
- Artillery rounds: 155 mm and 105 mm.
- Mortar rounds: 120 mm.
- Tank ammunition: 120 mm and 105 mm.
- Ammunition: 25 mm.
- Tube-launched, optically tracked, wire-guided missiles.
- About 400 grenade launchers and 200,000 rounds of ammunition.
- Tactical vehicles to recover equipment: 11.
- Heavy fuel tankers: 61.
- Heavy equipment transport: 10 trucks and 10 trailers.
- Testing and diagnostic equipment to support vehicle maintenance and repair.
- Spare parts and other field equipment.

In addition, $2.1 billion in USAI for Ukraine included:

- Additional munitions for National Advanced Surface-to-Air Missile Systems.
- Nine counter-unmanned serial system 30 mm gun trucks.
- Mobile counter-unmanned aircraft system, or C-UAS, laser-guided rocket systems: 10.
- Three air surveillance radars.
- Anti-aircraft ammunition: 30 mm and 23 mm.
- Artillery rounds: 130 mm and 122 mm.
- Grad rockets: 122 mm.
- Rocket launchers and ammunition.
- Mortar systems: 120 mm and 81 mm.
- Mortar rounds: 120 mm, 81 mm, and 60 mm.
- Tank ammunition: 120 mm.
- Javelin anti-armor systems.
- Anti-armor rockets.
- Precision aerial munitions.
- About 3,600 small arms and more than 23,000,000 rounds of small-arms ammunition.
- Seven tactical vehicles to recover equipment.
- Eight heavy fuel tankers and 105 fuel trailers.
- Armored bridging systems.
- Four logistics support vehicles.
- Trucks and 10 trailers to transport heavy equipment.
- Secure communications equipment.
- Satellite communications terminals and services, and
- Funding for training, maintenance and sustainment.

By 19 April 2023, another $325 million in aid was heading to Ukraine, including additional ammunition for high-mobility artillery rocket systems; 155 mm and 105 mm artillery rounds; tube-launched, optically tracked wire-guided missiles for the U.S.-provided Bradley armored fighting vehicles; AT-4 anti-armor weapon systems; anti-tank mines; demolition munitions for obstacle clearing; over 9 million rounds of small arms ammunition; four logistics support vehicles; and precision aerial munitions,

On 3 May 2023, US Secretary of State Antony Blinken announced the 37th drawdown package for Ukraine of up to $300 million in materiel. The package had been reported by Associated Press. The package included:

- Additional ammunition for High Mobility Artillery Rocket Systems (HIMARS);
- 155 mm howitzers;
- 155 mm artillery rounds;
- 120 mm, 81 mm, and 60 mm mortar rounds;
- Tube-Launched, Optically-Tracked, Wire-Guided (TOW) missiles;
- AT-4 and Carl Gustaf anti-armor weapon systems;
- Hydra-70 aircraft rockets;
- Small arms and small arms ammunition;
- Demolition munitions for obstacle clearing;
- Trucks and trailers to transport heavy equipment;
- Testing and diagnostic equipment to support vehicle maintenance and repair; and
- Spare parts and other field equipment. An air-to-ground munition, the Hydra 70 70 mm air-launched rocket was donated for the first time.

On 9 May 2023, the Pentagon announced a new USAI package for Ukraine; under USAI, the materiel will not arrive in Ukraine as quickly as that of a Presidential drawdown from DoD stocks; instead, up to $1.2 billion in contracts between DoD (US Department of Defense) and its defense vendors are being arranged for future delivery to Ukraine. This support is intended to bolster Ukraine's air defense, as well as to augment the artillery stocks. (Note: For example, 155 mm howitzer shells are to be manufactured in much greater quantities in the coming months and years to augment both Ukraine's and DoD's future stocks of ammunition; but contracts for GMLRS, HIMARS, improved Stingers, Javelins, etc. are being let.)

On 11 May 2023, the UK announced its contribution of Storm Shadow cruise missiles.

On 14 May 2023, Germany announced the contribution of €2.7 billion ($2.95 billion, which doubles its contribution since the beginning of the invasion of 24 February 2022) in aid to Ukraine, including 30 Leopard 1A5 main battle tanks, 20 armored infantry fighting vehicles, four IRIS-T SLM air defense systems, 100 armored fighting vehicles, and 200 drones.

On 31 May 2023, the US announced the 39th presidential drawdown package, worth up to $300 million. The aid consists of additional missiles for the Patriot air defense systems, Avenger air defense systems, Stinger antiaircraft systems and AIM-7 missiles for air defense. In addition more artillery and antiarmor capabilities, and precision aerial munitions was provided.

On 1 June 2023, The Pentagon announced that the Department of Defense will buy Starlink satellite services for Ukraine's communications network. SpaceX had until then been providing Ukrainians and the country's military with Starlink internet service through private donations and under a separate contract with a U.S. foreign aid agency.

On 9 June 2023, the US donated up to $2.1 billion in Ukraine Security Assistance (USAI):

- Additional munitions for Patriot air defense systems;
- HAWK air defense systems and missiles;
- 105 mm and 203 mm artillery rounds;
- Puma Unmanned Aerial Systems;
- Laser-guided rocket system munitions;
- Support for training, maintenance, and sustainment activities. Unlike the US drawdown packages, in which materiel arrives immediately, the USAI is meant to aid Ukraine over the course of the ongoing campaign over the upcoming months.

On 13 June 2023, the US donated its 40th drawdown package to Ukraine since August 2021:

- Additional munitions for National Advanced Surface-to-Air Missile Systems (NASAMS);
- Stinger anti-aircraft systems;
- Additional ammunition for High Mobility Artillery Rocket Systems (HIMARS);
- 155 mm and 105 mm artillery rounds;
- 15 Bradley Infantry Fighting Vehicles;
- 10 Stryker Armored Personnel Carriers;
- Javelin anti-armor systems;
- Tube-Launched, Optically-Tracked, Wire-Guided (TOW) missiles;
- AT-4 anti-armor systems;
- Over 22 million rounds of small arms ammunition and grenades;
- Demolition munitions for obstacle clearing; (Note: Example de-mining operations were demonstrated between Levadne and Pryiutne on 13 Jun 2023)
- Tactical secure communications support equipment; and
- Spare parts and other field equipment.

The package is worth up to $325 million; since the beginning of the invasion, the US has committed over $39 billion in aid to Ukraine.

The aid was announced on the eve of the 13th Ukraine Defense Contact Group meeting in Brussels. (Note: From late Feb 2022 to May 2023 13,100 Ukrainian troops will have been trained in combined arms, Patriot systems, HIMARS launchers, Abrams tanks.)

On 27 June 2023, the US donated its 41st package to Ukraine since August 2021, a USAI donation. The package is worth up to $500 million including additional armored vehicles (25 Strykers and 30 Bradleys), more artillery rounds, Javelins, Stingers, and critical munitions for U.S.-provided Patriot air defense systems and high-mobility artillery rocket systems (HIMARS). Total aid from the US to Ukraine has amounted to more than $40.5 billion as of 27 June 2023.

On 7 July 2023, the US provided Patriot air defense systems (Note: Ukraine has shown that Patriot missiles can counter hypersonic missiles.) and high-mobility artillery rocket systems (HIMARS), as well as hundreds of thousands of rounds of artillery; this is the 42nd drawdown for Ukraine, up to $800 million. In addition, the US might provide DPICM (cluster antipersonnel) shells.

On 25 July 2023 the 43rd drawdown from US stocks gave Ukraine up to $400 million in military aid, including HIMARS and NASAMS rockets, Hydra 70 rockets, Stingers and Javelins, 155 mm artillery shells, 32 Stryker armoured combat vehicles, mine clearance equipment, mortars and millions of small-arms rounds, and miniature Hornet drones.

On 14 August 2023 the 44th drawdown from US stocks donated materiel worth up to $200 million to Ukraine, including rockets for the MIM-104 Patriot air defense systems and high-mobility artillery rocket systems (HIMARS).

On 29 August 2023 the 45th Presidential drawdown from US stocks donated up to $250 million to Ukraine, including:

- AIM-9M missiles for air defense;
- Additional ammunition for High Mobility Artillery Rocket Systems, also called HIMARS;
- 155 mm and 105 mm artillery rounds;
- Mine-clearing equipment;
- Tube-launched, optically tracked, wire-guided, or "TOW" missiles;
- Javelin and other anti-armor systems and rockets;
- Hydra-70 rockets;
- Over 3 million rounds of small-arms ammunition;
- Armored medical treatment vehicles and high-mobility multipurpose wheeled vehicle, or Humvee, ambulances;
- Demolitions munitions for obstacle clearing;
- Spare parts, maintenance, and other field equipment.

By August 2023 the US had supplied over 2 million 155 mm artillery rounds to Ukraine since 24 February 2022.

On 6 September 2023 the 46th Presidential drawdown from US stocks donated up to $175 million to Ukraine, including additional air defense equipment; 155 mm and 105 mm artillery rounds; and other anti-armor systems and rockets. The tranche is provisioned from the $6.2 billion in presidential drawdown authority restored in June 2023, leaving $5.75 billion in restored funding remaining.

On 7 September 2023 the Biden administration announced a USAI package of up to $600 billion for Ukraine:

- Equipment to sustain and integrate Ukraine's air defense systems;
- Additional ammunition for High Mobility Artillery Rocket Systems (HIMARS);
- 105 mm artillery rounds;
- Electronic warfare and counter-electronic warfare equipment;
- Demolition munitions for obstacle clearing;
- Mine clearing equipment; and
- Support and equipment for training, maintenance, and sustainment activities.

On 21 September 2023 the 47th drawdown package for Ukraine, released after President Zelenskyy's visit to Washington DC, was valued at up to $325 million. That Thursday, 21 September 2023, President Biden informed President Zelenskyy that the US would be willing to provide Ukraine with ATACMS missiles. ATACMS missiles were secretly delivered to Ukraine before 17 October 2023, when they were used to hit Berdiansk airfield.

On 11 October 2023 as announced during the 16th meeting of the Ukraine Defense Contact Group (UDCG), UDCG partner nation Germany has donated an additional $1.1 billion package for Ukraine, including a Patriot system and additional Patriot missiles. US Secretary of Defense Lloyd Austin pointed out that Germany, the United Kingdom, and Poland, have each donated more by percentage of their GDP than has the US. By 3 November 2023 the US had announced its 50th security package for Ukraine, worth up to $425 million. By 17 November 2023 the goal of §one million 155 mm artillery shells within one year for Ukraine from European manufacturers was shown to be unrealistic, requiring more than the signing of contracts, but also the allocation of manufacturing resources, and the consideration of existing logistic contracts within the European defence community; the defence trade association had to remind the community that it takes time to include this important capability. By comparison, as of December 2022 the US Army looked to increasing 155 mm howitzer shell production to 20,000 rounds per month by spring 2024, and to 40,000 rounds per month by 2025. On 23 January 2024 NATO signed contracts worth $1.2 billion, for 220,000 155 mm artillery rounds for resupply of the NATO alliance. The resupply agreement will not provide shells for 24 to 36 months.

While on a visit to Kyiv, US Secretary of Defense Lloyd Austin announced a $100 million aid package to Ukraine (the 51st), a Presidential drawdown from US stocks consisting of 155 mm artillery shells, additional interceptors for air defence, and antitank weapons. Germany has pledged $1.4 billion in aid to Ukraine, including 4 IRIS-T air defense systems, 20,000 more 155 mm artillery shells, and antitank mines. The 155 mm artillery shells are in addition to 140,000 155 mm rounds which Germany pledged to deliver in 2024, an $8.5 billion pledge. On 22 November 2023 US Secretary of Defense Lloyd Austin opened the 17th meeting of the Ukraine Defense Contact Group in a virtual session online; the $100 million US package (the 51st) which was announced 20 November additionally included a HIMARS system.

On 4 November 2023 the Swedish Ministry of Defense confirmed its delivery of 8 Archer Artillery Systems to Ukraine. An Archer howitzer is self-propelled, is capable of firing 9 shells in one minute, and can replenish its 155 mm shells within 10 minutes, when resupplied by its munitions carrier. Sweden's contribution to Ukraine has amounted to $2 billion as of November 2023.

On 12 December 2023 the US Department of Defense announced its 53rd package for Ukraine, a $200 million package, including AIM-9M missiles for air defense; additional ammunition for HIMARS; 155 mm and 105 mm artillery rounds; High-speed Anti-radiation missiles (HARMs); Tube-Launched, Optically-Tracked, Wire-Guided (TOW) missiles; Javelin and AT-4 anti-armor systems; Demolitions munitions for obstacle clearing.

On 27 December 2023 the US Department of Defense announced its 54th package for Ukraine since August 2021, a $250 million package. The aid included munitions for air defense munitions, as well as air defense system components. Additional ammunition was for high mobility artillery rocket systems, as well as for 155 mm and 105 mm artillery, for anti-armor munitions, and for over 15 million rounds of small-arms ammunition for Ukraine.

On 23 January 2024 the 18th meeting of the Ukraine Defense Contact Group (UDCG) was held virtually. Two coalitions were formed to benefit Ukraine, one for drones led by Latvia, and one for armor led by Poland. Ground-Launched Small Diameter Bombs (§ GLSDBs)— which are compatible with HIMARS and GMLRS— were tested 16 January 2024 in preparation for their deployment to Ukraine.

On 14 February 2024 the 19th meeting of the Ukraine Defense Contact Group (UDCG) was held virtually. DoD Secretary Austin highlighted six UDCG coalitions:

1. Led by the US, Denmark, and the Netherlands: air-force capabilities;
2. Led by the US, and France: coalition on artillery;
3. Led by Germany, and France: coalition on ground-based air defense;
4. Led by the UK, and Norway: coalition on maritime security;
5. Led by Poland, a coalition on armor: and Estonia: coalition on IT;
6. Led by Luxembourg, and Latvia: a coalition on drones; and a coalition on demining led by Lithuania.

At the Munich Security conference on 18 February 2024 the Czech Republic announced it had found suppliers of at least 800,000 155 mm artillery shells located in non-Western countries for $1.5 billion. The shells would have to be supplied to Ukraine via a middleman as the suppliers are not willing to supply Ukraine directly. A coalition of Belgium, Canada, Denmark, The Netherlands and about one dozen other countries could fund 400,000 of those 155 mm shells, as of 1 March 2024.

On 12 March 2024 US National Security Advisor Jake Sullivan announced that a $300 million cost savings in 2024 procurement has enabled the US to ship a security assistance package to Ukraine, consisting of "Stinger anti-aircraft missiles, HIMARS rockets, 155 mm high-explosive and cluster-munition artillery rounds, 105 mm artillery rounds, 84 anti-armor systems, and small arms ammunition". In April 2024 more ATACMS missiles were secretly dilivered to Ukraine.

In early April 2024, the Prime Minister of Latvia, Evika Silina, made an announcement regarding Latvia's plan to send drones worth one million euros to Ukraine soon. She mentioned that as a member of the Drone Coalition, Latvia intends to allocate a minimum of EUR 10 million in 2024 for the acquisition of drones.

=== Fighter jets for Ukraine ===
Poland announced its MiG-29 fighter jets would be transferred to Ukraine, although one will be retained for a military museum in Poland. Four MiGs were immediately transferred, the remainder were refurbished before their transfer, On 17 March 2023, Slovakia agreed to give Ukraine its MiG-29 fighter jets. All 13 aircraft arrived by 17 April 2023.

On 20 January 2023, the Netherlands proposed donating US-made F-16 fighter planes to Ukraine; this would require US permission. By 19 May, the coalition agreed to train Ukrainian pilots on F-16 simulators in Europe. This would allow the Netherlands, Belgium, Denmark, and Norway to donate F-16s to Ukraine, eventually. At the G-7 summit in Hiroshima Japan on 20 May 2023, US president Biden announced that the United States would also train Ukrainian pilots to fly F-16s. Poland, Denmark, the Netherlands, Belgium, Norway, and the US are in the planning stage for the F-16 training.

Ten F-16s cost $1 billion and their sustainment cost another $1 billion. By 25 May 2023, the nations of the UDCG had donated $65 billion to Ukraine's defense. The US approved F-16 training for Ukrainian pilots and maintenance crews. The training took three to four months. As of 18 August, the Netherlands and Denmark had confirmed they had US approval to transfer F-16s to Ukraine. Ukraine could start to receive dozens of F-16s in December 2023 and January 2024. As of 27 December 2023, "at least 14 Ukrainian Air Force pilots now have some training on the" F-16. Six F-16s from Denmark are now expected in Ukraine in the second quarter of 2024, out of Denmark's total pledge of 19 aircraft by 2025. F-16s will start operating in Ukraine after 5 May 2024.

=== European purchases of Indian artillery ammunition ===
On 19 September 2024, Reuters revealed European countries have been purchasing artillery shells from Indian "arms makers", then transferring these shells to Ukraine. The Indian government hasn't officially authorised such exports. The Kremlin raised the issue with New Delhi on at least two occasions.

== Support for Russia ==
Support for Russia since the start of the war has come from countries such as Belarus, North Korea, China, and Iran. This support has been principally military in nature.

== Foreign military involvement ==
=== Ukraine ===
Ukraine has actively sought volunteers from other countries after the beginning of the Russian invasion. On March 1, 2022, Ukraine temporarily lifted visa requirements for foreign volunteers who wished to join the fight against Russian forces. The move came after Zelenskyy created the International Legion of Territorial Defense of Ukraine and called on volunteers to "join the defense of Ukraine, Europe and the world". The US also assisted Ukraine with military planning, including war-gaming counter-offensive options.

Ukraine's foreign minister Dmytro Kuleba stated as of 6 March 2022, approximately 20,000 foreign nationals from 52 countries had volunteered to fight. Most of these volunteers joined the newly created International Legion of Territorial Defense of Ukraine. On June 9, the Donetsk People's Republic sentenced three foreign volunteers to death; two of them were British citizens and one was a Moroccan national. The prisoners were later released.

NATO, US and the EU have publicly taken a strict policy of "no boots on the ground" in Ukraine. However, since the start of the invasion, the United States has increased the covert involvement of its special operations forces and CIA officers in support of Ukraine. In April 2023, classified documents on Western special operations forces involvement in the war were leaked online. According to the document, dated 23 March 2023, the UK had the largest contingent of special operations personnel in Ukraine (50), followed by fellow NATO states Latvia (17), France (15), the US (14), and the Netherlands (1). The US personnel were posted to the US embassy in Kyiv to provide security for VIPs, and to assist with oversight of US equipment and supplies being sent to Ukraine.

On 8 November 2024, US President Joe Biden allowed American private military contractors to operate in Ukraine. Per the United States Department of Defense, these contractors will help Ukraine repair and maintain military equipment.

=== Russia ===
On 3 March 2022, Russian Defense Ministry spokesman Igor Konashenkov warned mercenaries are not entitled to protection under the Geneva Conventions and that captured foreign fighters would not be considered prisoners of war but prosecuted as criminals. On March 11, Moscow announced 16,000 volunteers from the Middle East were ready to join other pro-Russian foreign fighters alongside the Donbas separatists. A video uploaded online showed armed Central African paramilitaries preparing to fight with Russian troops in Ukraine.

On 8 April 2025, two Chinese nationals fighting for Russia were captured by Ukrainian forces, with intelligence suggesting more Chinese citizens could be fighting on behalf of Russia.

==== Iran ====
On 21 October 2022, a White House press release stated Iranian troops were in Crimea assisting Russia to launch drone attacks against civilians and civilian infrastructure. On November 24, Ukrainian officials said the military had killed ten Iranians and would target any further Iranian military presence in Ukraine.

==== North Korea ====
North Korea has publicately denied any support for Russia and its war against Ukraine, but on 3 October 2024, Ukraine made a missile strike in Russian-occupied Donetsk Oblast, claiming that over 20 were killed, including six North Korean officers with three more North Korean servicemen wounded. Later from 8 October, Ukraine and South Korea both claimed that North Koreans troops had been deployed to the battlefield to help with the launch missiles, and had suffered several casualties. A week later, a White House spokesperson said that the United States was "concerned" about reports of North Korean soldiers fighting for Russia in Ukraine.

On 18 October, the South Korean National Intelligence Service said that North Korea was sending troops to fight with Russia in Ukraine. South Korean President Yoon Suk Yeol called for a security meeting and called for the international community to respond with "all available means". A few days later, on 23 October, United States defence secretary Lloyd Austin said that there was evidence that North Korean troops were in Russia and preparing to travel to the battlefield in Ukraine. By 25 October Ukraine reported that the first North Korean military units had entered the active "warzones" in Russia's Kursk Oblast. The North Korean soldiers were reportedly under the command of Deputy Defence Minister Yunus-bek Yevkurov. A Lithuanian NPO reported that the first North Korean unit that entered in warzone was almost entirely killed, with only 1 survivor. On 28 October The Pentagon said that the U.S. will not impose new limits on Ukraine's use of American weapons if North Korea joins Russia's war, as NATO said North Korean military units had been deployed to the Kursk region in Russia. The US secretary of state, Antony Blinken, said on 31 October that about 8,000 North Korean soldiers were stationed in Russia on the border with Ukraine, warning that Moscow is preparing to deploy those troops into combat “in the coming days”.

On 4 November 2024, Ukrainian officials claimed military engagement with North Korean soldiers deployed in the Kursk region, marking the first instance of foreign military intervention since Russia's 2022 full-scale invasion. On 21 November 2024, anonymous western officials reported that a Ukraine missile strike on a Russian army command and communication post in the Kursk region the day before had wounded a senior North Korean general.

On 18 November 2024, the Khyzhak Brigade claimed that it had killed two "North Korean mercenaries" in Kursk Oblast, and during an off-camera, on-the-record press briefing, Pentagon spokesman Major General Pat Ryder told reporters on 16 December 2024 that North Korean soldiers had suffered casualties in the Kursk region. He also said that there were 12,000 North Korean soldiers in Russia. On 14 December 2024 the Ukrainian military intelligence agency (HUR) reported that 8 Russian soldiers of the Chechen Akhmat unit had been killed after their vehicles had been fired on by North Koreans in a friendly fire incident caused by the language barrier between them. On 26 December 2024, the Ukrainian military news website Militarnyi reported that a North Korean soldier had been captured by Ukrainian special forces during an operation in Kursk Oblast. A picture of him was published in a Telegram Channel and he was described as appearing to be in a serious condition with wounds visible. On 27 December 2024, the South Korean National Intelligence Service claimed the first capture of a North Korean soldier fighting against Ukrainian forces in Kursk Oblast, Russia, with the soldier later dying from his injuries. Zelenskyy said on the same day that several badly wounded North Korean soldiers have died after being captured by Ukraine during the war as they were to injured to be saved. In an interview with the Korean Broadcasting System, the Ukrainian Defense Minister, Rustem Umierov claimed that North Koreans were "difficult to identify" due to similarities to Buryats. He also claimed that North Koreans soldiers were wearing Russian uniforms which further complicated identification. On 11 January 2025, Ukraine claimed to have captured alive two other North Korean soldiers. On 13 December 2025, Kim Jong Un announced that 9 North Korean troops working as part a mine clearing regiment in Kursk had been killed since the beginning of the 120 day deployment in August.

On 26 April 2026, North Korea publicly opened the Memorial Museum of Foreign Military Operations in a ceremony attended by Russian Defence Minister Andrei Belousov and Chairman of the State Duma Vyacheslav Volodin. The museum commemorates the official participation of North Korean soldiers who fought and died in Kursk. Captured equipment were displayed like the American M1A1 Abrams, German Leopard 2A4, German Marder IFV, French AMX-10 RC, and Turkish Kirpi MRAP.

== International reactions ==
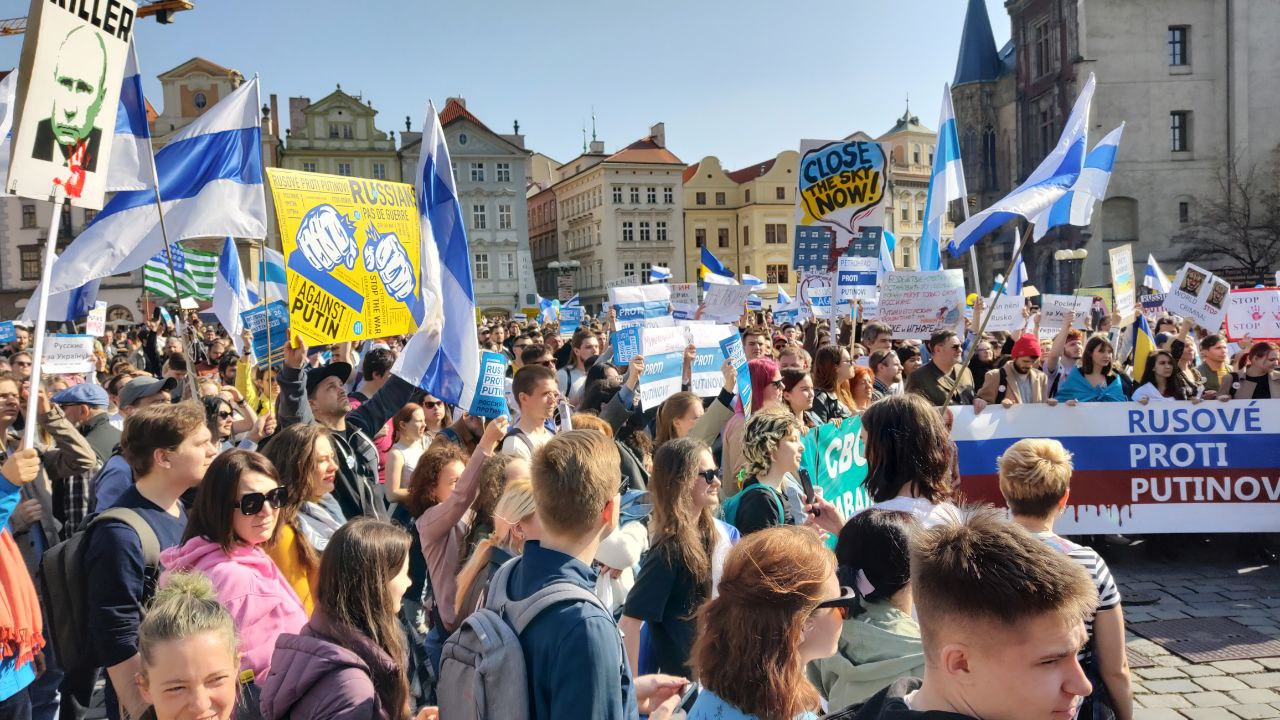
Protest of Russians living in Czech Republic against the war in Ukraine, on 26 March 2022

The Russian invasion of Ukraine received widespread international condemnation and protests occurred around the world. On March 2, the United Nations General Assembly passed UNGA resolution ES-11/1 condemning the invasion and demanding a full withdrawal of Russian forces. The International Court of Justice ordered Russia to suspend military operations and the Council of Europe expelled Russia. Many countries imposed sanctions on Russia, which have affected the economies of Russia and the world; and provided humanitarian and military aid to Ukraine. The International Criminal Court opened an investigation into crimes against humanity in Ukraine since 2013, as well as war crimes during the 2022 invasion.

Chinese and Belarusian troops began joint military exercises near Brest, close to the Polish border, on 8 July 2024. The "Eagle Assault" maneuvers, lasting until 19 July 2024, focused on anti-terrorist operations including night landings, overcoming water obstacles, and urban combat.

The United States and Britain pledged around $1.5 billion in additional aid to Ukraine on 11 September 2024. The U.S. declared over $700 million in humanitarian aid, while Britain stated $782 million in further aid and loan guarantees.

The US's recent votes at the UN, aligning with Russia on key resolutions regarding the Russia-Ukraine conflict, underscore a shift in US policy. This has strained relations with European allies, who advocated for stronger actions against Russia, highlighting growing geopolitical divisions.

=== Economic sanctions against Russia ===
US President Joe Biden's statements and a short question and answer session on 24 February 2022

Western and other countries imposed limited sanctions on Russia when it recognized Donbas as an independent nation. When Russia invaded Ukraine in February 2022, many other countries applied sanctions intended to devastate the Russian economy. The sanctions targeted individuals, banks, businesses, monetary exchanges, bank transfers, exports, and imports. The sanctions cut off major Russian banks from SWIFT, the global messaging network for international payments, but left some limited access to ensure the continued ability to pay for gas shipments. Sanctions also included asset freezes on the Russian Central Bank, which holds $630 billion in foreign-exchange reserves, to prevent it from offsetting the effects of sanctions, and froze construction of the Nord Stream 2 gas pipeline. By 1 March 2022, $1 trillion of Russian assets were frozen by sanctions.

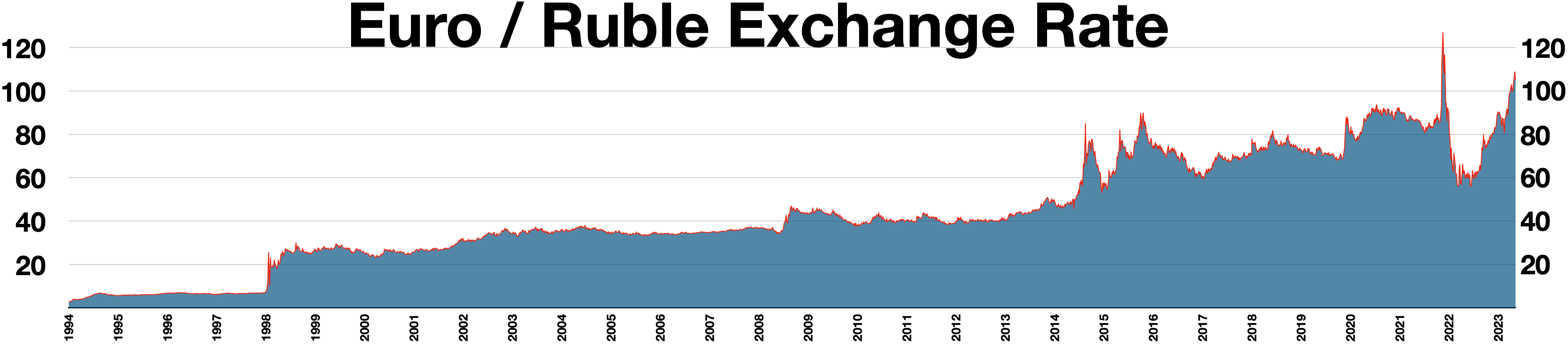
EUR/Ruble exchange rate (Rubles per Euro)

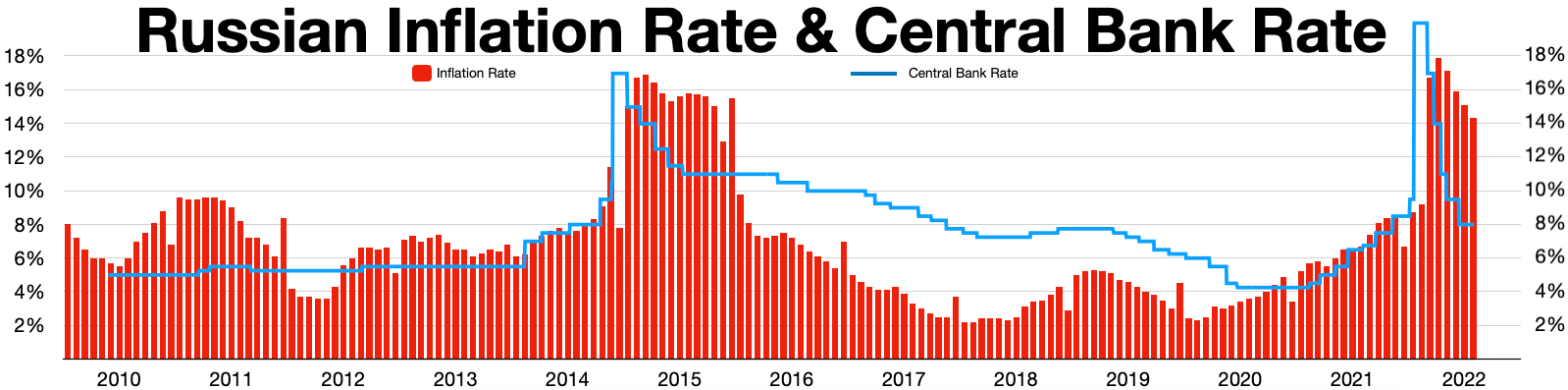
Russian inflation rate Central Bank of Russia key interest rate

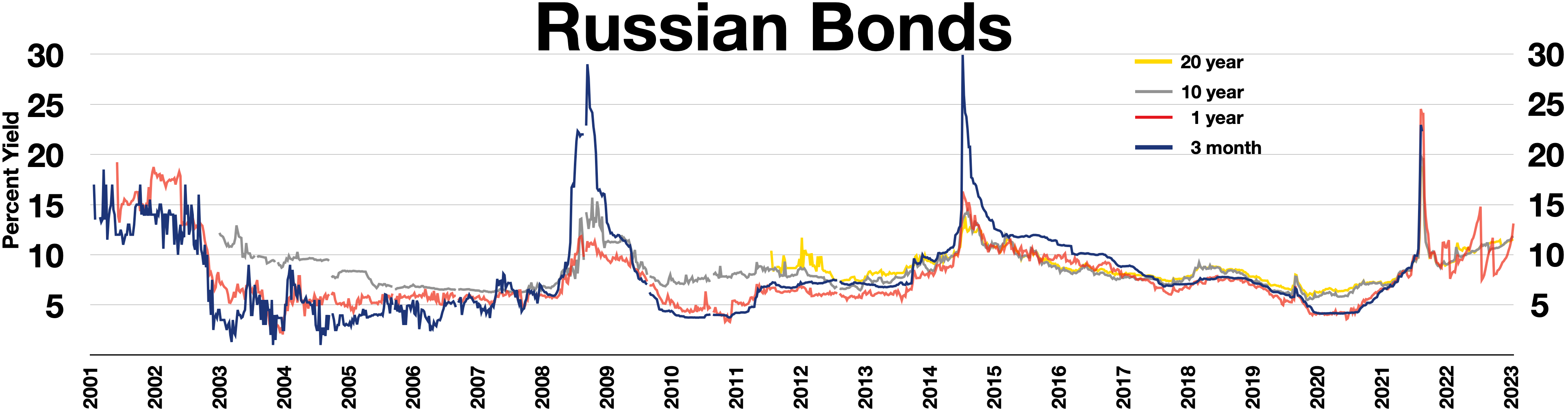
Russian bonds, inverted yield curves to tame inflation during their wars (Russo-Georgian War, Russo-Ukrainian War, 2022 Russian invasion of Ukraine) 20 year bond 10 year bond 1 year bond 3 month bond

Kristalina Georgieva, managing director of the International Monetary Fund (IMF), said the conflict posed a substantial economic risk, both regionally and internationally, and that the IMF could help other affected countries, in addition to the $2.2 billion loan package for Ukraine. David Malpass, president of the World Bank Group, warned of far-reaching economic and social effects, and reported the bank was preparing significant economic and fiscal support to Ukraine and the region.

Economic sanctions affected Russia from the first day of the invasion; its stock market fell by up to 39% (RTS Index). The Russian ruble fell to record lows, and Russians rushed to exchange currency. Stock exchanges in Moscow and Saint Petersburg closed until at least 18 March, the longest-such closure in Russia's history. On 26 February, S&P Global Ratings downgraded the Russian government credit rating to "junk", causing funds that require investment-grade bonds to dump Russian debt, making further borrowing very difficult for Russia. On 11 April, S&P Global placed Russia under "selective default" on its foreign debt for insisting on payments in rubles. Dozens of Western corporations, including Unilever, McDonald's, Coca-Cola, Starbucks, Hermès, Chanel, and Prada ceased trading in Russia.

On 24 March, Joe Biden's administration issued an executive order that barred the sale of Russian gold reserves by US citizens; other G7 leaders took similar action. Russia has used gold to protect its economy from the effects of the sanctions that were imposed following the 2014 annexation of Crimea. In April 2022, Russia supplied 45% of EU's natural gas imports, earning $900 million a day. Russia is the world's largest exporter of natural gas, grains, and fertilisers, and is among the world's largest suppliers of crude oil, coal, and steel and other metals, including palladium, platinum, gold, cobalt, nickel, and aluminum.

Russia Countries on Russia's unfriendly countries list. Countries and territories on the list have imposed or joined sanctions against Russia.

In May 2022, the European Commission (EC) proposed a ban on oil imports from Russia. European policy-makers decided to replace Russian fossil fuel imports with other fossil fuels imports and European coal energy production. Because of Russia's status as "a key supplier" of materials used for "clean energy technologies", reactions to the war in Ukraine may also have a negative impact on efforts to reduce greenhouse gas emissions. Due to the sanctions imposed on Russia, the country intended to capitalize on alternative trade routes.

In March 2022, a gas dispute between Russia and the EU began. On 14 June, Russia's Gazprom announced it would be reduce gas flow via the Nord Stream 1 pipeline due to what it called Siemens' failure to promptly return compressor units that had been sent to Canada for repair. Germany's energy regulator challenged the explanation.

On 17 June, President Putin spoke to investors at St. Petersburg International Economic Forum about economic sanctions, saying "the economic blitzkrieg against Russia had no chance of succeeding from the very beginning", that the sanctions would hurt the countries imposing them more than they would hurt Russia, and called the sanctions "mad and thoughtless". He said to the investors: "Invest here. It's safer in your own house. Those who didn't want to listen to this have lost millions abroad."

In January 2023, the US imposed sanctions on the Wagner Group, a private militia that until his death that August was owned by Yevgeny Prigozhin, a Russian oligarch with close ties to Vladimir Putin. The expanded sanctions also targeted related companies and individuals who were involved in the mercenary activities concerning Ukraine. In February 2023, the US urged the United Arab Emirates (UAE) and Egypt to persuade the military leaders of Libya and Sudan to end their associations with the Wagner Group. In Libya, the mercenary firm was assisting the UAE-backed military commander Khalifa Haftar. The UAE was the main funder of the Wagner Group in Libya. The Wagner Group had been involved in several African and Middle Eastern nations like Sudan, Libya, Mali, Syria, and the Central African Republic, where it deployed thousands of operatives.

In March 2023, Oleg Deripaska said Russia could run out of money by 2024; In 2022, Russia ran a $34 billion budget deficit. The Russian National Wealth Fund was funding the war at the rate of $8 to $9 billion per month, which could exhaust its liquid funds by the end of 2023. This would affect the retirement pension system of Russia. In March 2023, CCP General Secretary Xi Jinping and Vladimir Putin met in Moscow, and agreed to cooperate over a wide range of business, and economic issues, such as payment in renminbi or rubles.

=== United States sanctions against China ===
In April 2022, United States Secretary of Treasury Janet Yellen warned China that it could face consequences for not sanctioning Russia. In June 2022, the United States Department of Commerce placed five Hong Kong companies on the Bureau of Industry and Security's Entity List for providing support to Russia's military. The U.S. Treasury Department separately sanctioned a Chinese and an Armenian vendor for maintaining trade relationship with a Russian arms procurement firm. In September 2022, the Office of Foreign Assets Control sanctioned Sinno Electronics of Shenzhen for supplying a Russian military procurement network.

In January 2023, the U.S. Treasury Department sanctioned Spacety China, also known as Changsha Tianyi Space Science and Technology Research Institute Co. Ltd., for providing satellite imagery to the Wagner Group. In February 2023, the U.S. Commerce Department added AOOK Technology Ltd, Beijing Ti-Tech Science and Technology Development Co, Beijing Yunze Technology Co, and China HEAD Aerospace Technology Co to the Entity List for aiding Russia's military.

In March 2023, the U.S. Treasury Department sanctioned five Chinese companies for supplying equipment to the Iran Aircraft Manufacturing Industries Corporation, which manufactures HESA Shahed 136 drones used by Russia against Ukraine.

In July 2023, the U.S. Office of the Director of National Intelligence published a report stating that the Chinese government is assisting Russia to evade sanctions and providing it with dual-use technology.

In October 2023, the U.S. Department of Commerce added 42 Chinese companies to the Entity List for supplying Russia with microelectronics for missile and drone guidance systems. In April 2024, the Department of Commerce sanctioned a Chinese company for supporting Russia's military through the procurement, development, and proliferation of Russian drones. In May 2024, the U.S. sanctioned 20 companies in mainland China and Hong Kong for supplying Russia's military. In October 2024, the U.S. sanctioned two companies, Xiamen Limbach Aircraft Engine Co. and Redlepus Vector Industry, involving the production of long-range attack drones for Russia, including the Garpiya.

In June 2025, a majority of U.S. senators supported secondary sanctions against Russia that would impose 500% tariffs on countries that buy Russian oil, natural gas, uranium, and other exports. China is one of the main consumers of Russian energy.

== Other reactions ==
In response to the Russian invasion of Ukraine, Estonia removed a remaining Soviet-era monument from a square in Narva. After its removal, Estonia was subjected to "the most extensive cyberattack" since the 2007 cyberattacks on Estonia.

== See also ==
- Outline of the Russo-Ukrainian War
- Belarusian involvement in the Russian invasion of Ukraine
- China and the Russian invasion of Ukraine
- Iran and the Russian invasion of Ukraine
- NATO Security Assistance and Training for Ukraine
- United States and the Russian invasion of Ukraine
