= Ukraine Defense Contact Group =

Defensive alliance against 2022 Russian invasion of Ukraine

Ukraine Defense Contact Group, UDCG
- Ukraine (recipient) UDCG participants: 32 NATO member participants 24 Non-NATO member participants (Note: Argentine is to be marked. It joined UDCG on 13 June 2024. Sources confirm continued Argentine presence at all subsequent meetings up to the 29th session on July 21, 2025.) Delivered Ukraine military aid (but not a participant)
- Other name: Ramstein group
- Founder: 39 countries
- Founding leader: 28th US Secretary of Defence Lloyd Austin (chair till FEB 2025)
- Founding directives: Non-treaty operationally flexible intern'l Ukraine military aid forum
- Foundation: April 26, 2022, Ramstein Airbase
- Modus operandi: Members meetings
- Subgroups: 9 capability coalitions (Note: The purpose of each coalition is to “create a greater and more coherent plan, which will further the options for future support and co-funding”. Oversight is provided by the Capability Coalition Leadership Group.)
- Groups: 4 working groups; led by NADs (Note: National Armaments Directors (NADs) Working Groups, active since the September 2022 Brussels meeting, are Innovation, Production, Sustainment, and Ukraine Defense Industrial Base Support. As of November 2025, 19 NAD meetings took place.)
- Headquarters: Not established
- Active regions: (recipient) Ukraine
- Status: Multinational coalition
- Size: 57 countries and EC (Note: As of November 2025, participation list is based on a country's representation in at least one meeting of the group. As per UDCG practice, member states (once admitted and formally welcomed) are considered "participants" unless specified otherwise.)
- Part of: Ukraine security guarantees design; AL, AU, CA, EU, GB, IE, JP, KR, ME, MK, NO, NZ, US sanctions, international sanctions during the Russian invasion of Ukraine aiming BY, RU; International sanctions against North Korea, Iran
- Notes

The Ukraine Defense Contact Group (abbr. UDCG, also known as the Ramstein group) is an alliance of 57 countries (all 32 member states of NATO and 25 other countries) and the European Union supporting the defence of Ukraine by sending military equipment in response to the 2022 Russian invasion. The group coordinates the ongoing donation of military aid at monthly meetings. A first inaugural meeting took place on 26 April 2022, which was attended by 39 out of 44 invited countries. Representatives from Israel and Qatar were present at the table of the inaugural meeting, but did not appear on the official list of attendees, despite several official media reports confirming their participation. The coalition comprised 54 countries at the time of the 14 February 2023 meeting and the same number at the 11 October 2023 meeting. As of November 2023, reports of meetings usually stated "about 50" members or "more than 50" members. No official member list exists for the Ukraine Defense Contact Group, but a membership is assumed whenever a country participated in at least one of its meetings.

== Formation, founding directives, participation ==
Following the initial formation - after direct orders from Secretary Austin - Under Secretary of Defense for Acquisition and Sustainment, Dr. William LaPlante, was tasked with organizing and regularly convening the forum of National Armaments Directors (NADs) under UDCG auspices. The purpose was to rapidly accelerate and synchronize delivery, production, and sustainment of vital military capabilities. As UDCG is not a treaty-based entity, membership status is conferred by representation at group meetings. As of November 2025, Argentina was the latest country that joined UDCG in June 2024.

== Meetings ==
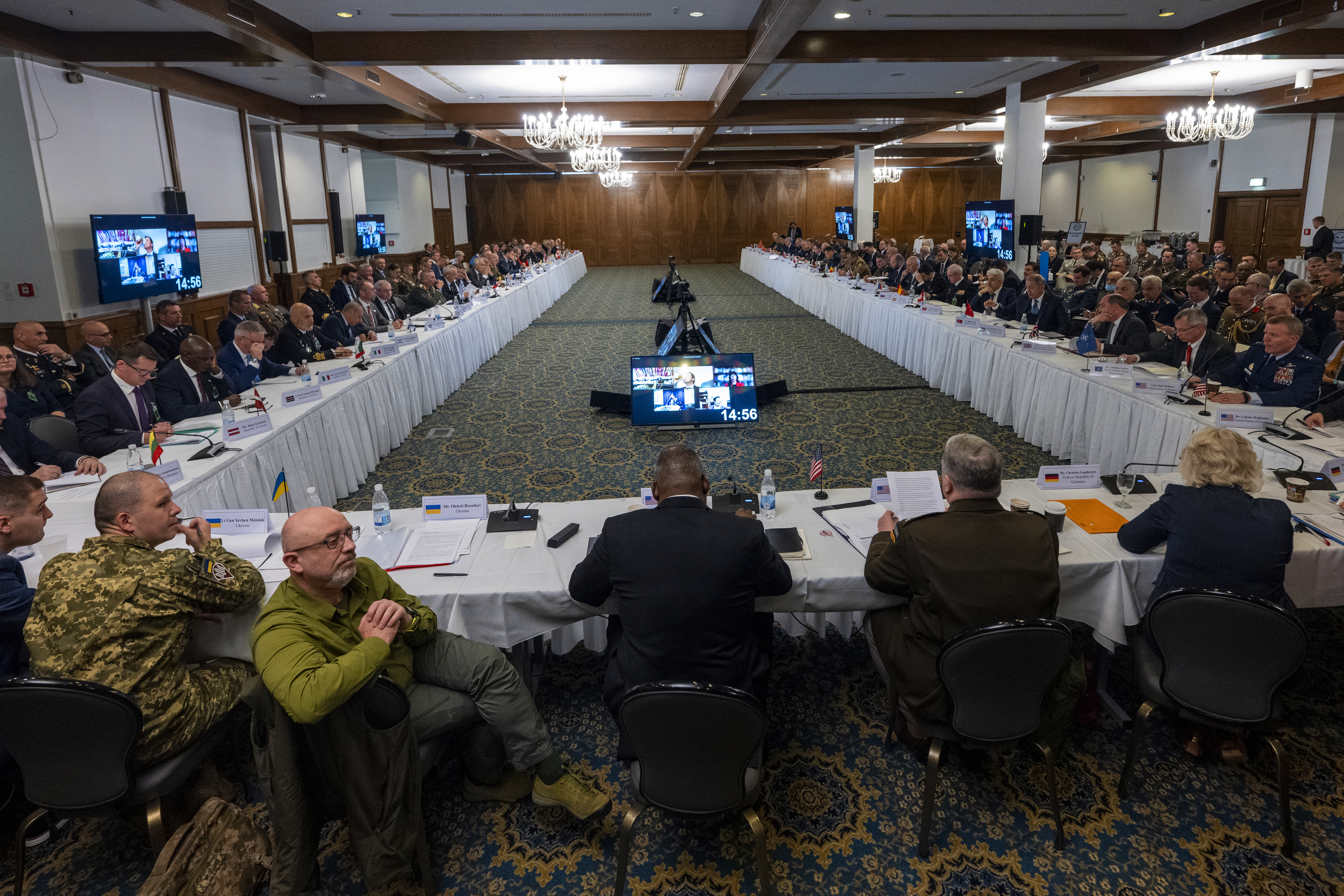
Inaugural Ukraine Defense Contact Group meeting on 26 April 2022

At the 20 January 2023 meeting at Ramstein Air Base, leading to the group thereafter being referred to as the "Ramstein Group", the alliance supported sending heavy offensive weaponry to Ukraine, in support of a planned spring offensive. The possible transfer of German-made Leopard 2 main battle tanks from Poland was a sticking point at the January 2023 meeting and in bilateral discussions following this. Germany continued to delay Leopard tank exports until 25 January 2023 when it announced it would provide 14 of its own Leopard 2A6 tanks in tandem with the United States providing 31 M1 Abrams tanks. By 25 February, 71 Leopard 2 tanks had been formally committed for delivery to Ukraine from Germany (18), Portugal (3), Sweden (10), Poland (14), Spain (10), Norway (8), and Canada (8); the first four arrived in Ukraine on 24 February. Additionally, a joint German-Danish-Dutch initiative was announced on 7 February to supply 100–178 Leopard 1A5 tanks from FFG and Rheinmetall stocks.

At the 14 February conference, the main topic of discussion was the transfer of modern fighter jets to Ukraine. The two subsequent meetings included considering how to finance an increase in industrial capacity to sustainably replace ammunition and equipment sent to Ukraine into the future.

The 11 October 2023 meeting took place after the Gaza war had started. Ukrainian president Volodymyr Zelenskyy attended, and was given assurances military aid would be sustained, although Zelenskyy acknowledged there was uncertainty. Zelenskyy emphasised the need for winter air defence. NBC News later reported that officials at the meeting had begun confidential and delicate talks with the Ukrainian officials about what the broad outlines of possible peace negotiations might entail, according to two U.S. participants.

The 23 January 2024 meeting concluded without any US funding, only from France, and Germany in the face of obstacles to funding in the US Congress.

There were plans for a leaders level meeting of the "Ramstein Group" on 12 October 2024, this meeting was postponed after US president Joe Biden cancelled his participation in order to oversee the response to Hurricane Milton.

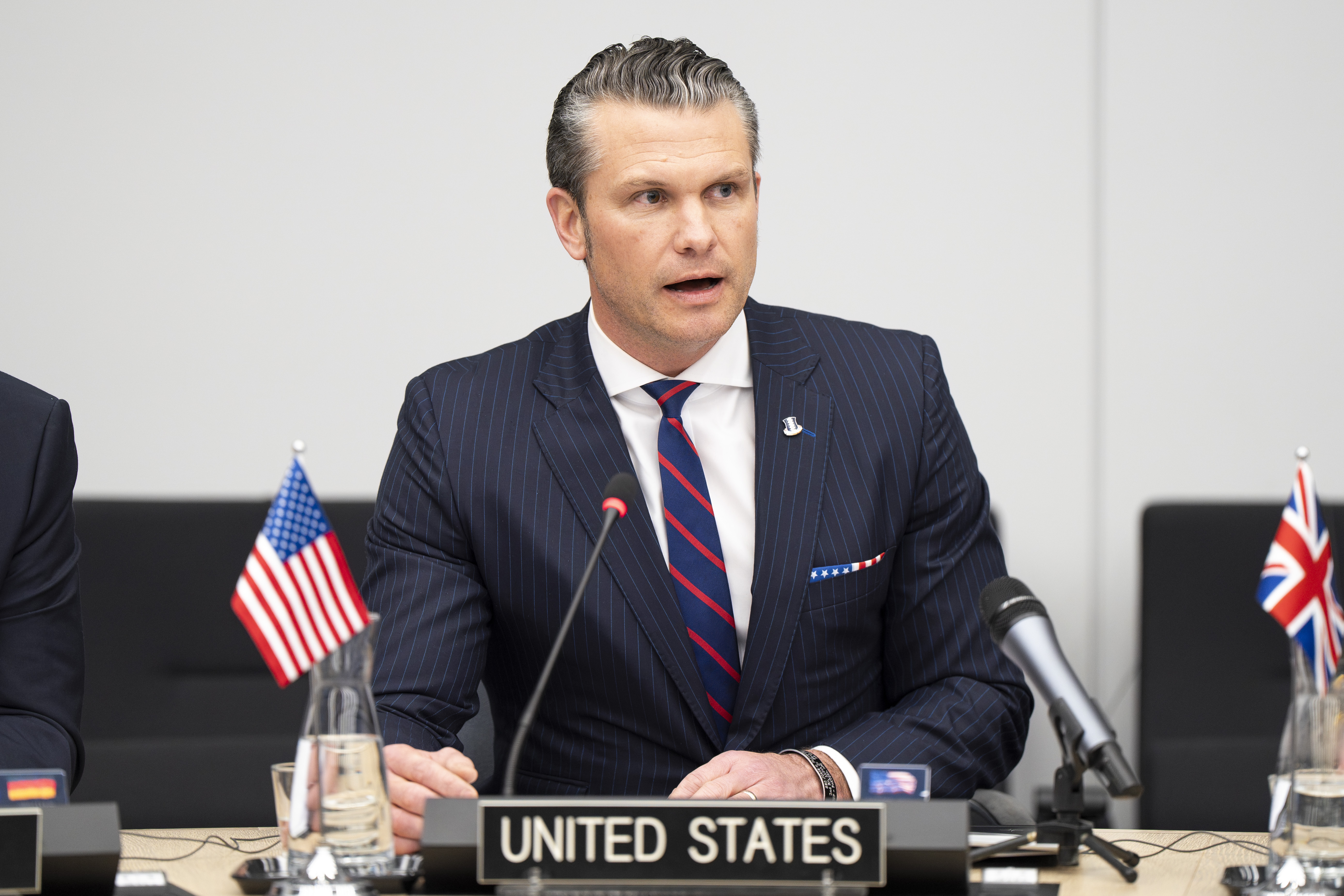
U.S. Secretary of Defense Pete Hegseth delivering opening remarks during the 26th UDCG meeting, 2025

At the first meeting after US president Donald Trump was inaugurated, on 12 February 2025, US Secretary of Defence Pete Hegseth said a return to Ukraine's pre-2014 borders was "an unrealistic objective" in any peace agreement, adding that any attempt to regain all of the territory "will only prolong the war and cause more suffering". He said that president Trump does not support membership of NATO for Ukraine in a peace agreement, and expects Europe to provide more financial and military assistance for Ukraine, while the US concentrates on its own security and the challenge of China; no US troops will be deployed to Ukraine.

=== Meetings list ===
| | Date | Host | Chair | Location | Ref. |
|---|---|---|---|---|---|
| 1 | 26 April 2022 | United States | Lloyd Austin | Ramstein Air Base | |
| 2 | 23 May 2022 | United States | Lloyd Austin | Virtual | |
| 3 | 15 June 2022 | United States | Lloyd Austin | NATO headquarters | |
| 4 | 20 July 2022 | United States | Lloyd Austin | Virtual | |
| 5 | 8 September 2022 | United States | Lloyd Austin | Ramstein Air Base | |
| 6 | 12 October 2022 | United States | Lloyd Austin | NATO headquarters | |
| 7 | 16 November 2022 | United States | Lloyd Austin | Virtual | |
| 8 | 20 January 2023 | United States | Lloyd Austin | Ramstein Air Base | |
| 9 | 14 February 2023 | United States | Lloyd Austin | NATO headquarters | |
| 10 | 15 March 2023 | United States | Lloyd Austin | Virtual | |
| 11 | 21 April 2023 | United States | Lloyd Austin | Ramstein Air Base | |
| 12 | 25 May 2023 | United States | Lloyd Austin | Virtual | |
| 13 | 15 June 2023 | United States | Lloyd Austin | NATO headquarters | |
| 14 | 18 July 2023 | United States | Lloyd Austin | Virtual | |
| 15 | 19 September 2023 | United States | Lloyd Austin | Ramstein Air Base | |
| 16 | 11 October 2023 | United States | Lloyd Austin | NATO headquarters | |
| 17 | 22 November 2023 | United States | Lloyd Austin | Virtual | |
| 18 | 23 January 2024 | United States | Lloyd Austin | Virtual | |
| 19 | 14 February 2024 | United States | Lloyd Austin | NATO headquarters | |
| 20 | 19 March 2024 | United States | Lloyd Austin | Ramstein Air Base | |
| 21 | 26 April 2024 | United States | Lloyd Austin | Virtual | |
| 22 | 20 May 2024 | United States | Lloyd Austin | Virtual | |
| 23 | 13 June 2024 | United States | Lloyd Austin | NATO headquarters | |
| 24 | 6 September 2024 | United States | Lloyd Austin | Ramstein Air Base | |
| 25 | 9 January 2025 | United States | Lloyd Austin | Ramstein Air Base | |
| 26 | 12 February 2025 | United Kingdom | John Healey | NATO headquarters | |
| 27 | 11 April 2025 | Germany; United Kingdom | Boris Pistorius; John Healey | NATO headquarters | |
| 28 | 4 June 2025 | Germany; United Kingdom | Boris Pistorius; John Healey | NATO headquarters | |
| 29 | 21 July 2025 | Germany; United Kingdom | Boris Pistorius; John Healey | Virtual | |
| 30 | 9 September 2025 | Germany; United Kingdom | Boris Pistorius; John Healey | London | |
| 31 | 15 October 2025 | Germany; United Kingdom | Boris Pistorius; John Healey | NATO headquarters | |
| 32 | 16 December 2025 | Germany; United Kingdom | Boris Pistorius; John Healey | Virtual | |
| 33 | 12 January 2026 | Germany; United Kingdom | Boris Pistorius; John Healey | NATO headquarters | |
| 34 | 15 April 2026 | Germany; United Kingdom | Boris Pistorius; John Healey | Berlin | |
| 35 | 18 June 2026 | Germany; United Kingdom | Boris Pistorius; Dan Jarvis | NATO headquarters | |

== Subgroups ==
Eight capability coalitions were formed within UDCG in February 2024, each being led by the following two to three countries at a time, with the aim of conducting an ongoing analyzis of the requirements for highly capable military equipment to Ukraine and coordinating their delivery (including the associated training efforts) from a larger group of countries committing to participate in each specified capability coalition:

- Air Force: Denmark, Netherlands, United States.

A total of 16 countries are involved in the fighter program. Belgium, Denmark, Norway and the Netherlands have committed to supply aircraft to Ukraine. So far, the United States has declined to supply its own F-16s, which are produced in America. Morris Air National Guard Base in Arizona, The 86th “Lieutenant Aviator Gheorghe Mociorniță” Air Base in Borcea, Romania; Skrydstrup Air Base in southern Denmark and undisclosed UK location are used for pilot training.

- Armor: Germany, Poland.
- Artillery: France, United States.
- Demining: Iceland, Lithuania.
- Drones: Latvia, United Kingdom.
- Integrated Air and Missile Defense: France, Germany.
- Information Technology: Estonia, Luxembourg.
- Maritime Security: Norway, United Kingdom.

An extra ninth capability coalition have been formed within UDCG in April 2025, for procurement of electronic warfare capabilities, training, and the development of electronic warfare policies and doctrine:

- Electronic warfare: Led by Germany with support from Sweden.

== Partners ==
The following countries have provided military aid (lethal and non-lethal) to Ukraine, although there is no public confirmation of their participation in the Ukraine Defense Contact Group:

- Azerbaijan (provided mortars and aerial bombs)
- Cambodia (provides de-mining training)
- Colombia (provides de-mining training)
- Israel (provided anti-drone systems, counter-drone intelligence, and non-lethal aid such as helmets, flak jackets, etc.) Israel has been unwilling to provide Ukraine with weapons.
- Jordan (provided rocket launchers and air defense missiles)
- Morocco (provided 20 T-72 tanks)
- Pakistan (provided artillery shells, rockets, and other ammunition)
- Sudan (provided 120 mm mortar bombs and additional undeclared aid)
- Taiwan (provided unmanned aerial vehicles)

=== US and Allied investment, munitions, production ===
US Capacity expansion

US official fact sheets and reportage indicate $5.3 billion invested in domestic defense production since early 2022, with specific reference to 155mm projectiles and propelling charges, GMLRS (Guided Multiple Launch Rocket System) missiles, Javelin anti-tank weapons, PAC-3 MSE interceptors, AIM-9X Sidewinder missiles, and HIMARS, among others. The reported capacity jumps - e.g., 155mm shells from 14,400 to 40,000 per month - are accurately reflected in both DoD data and independent defense analytics reporting.

Multinational expansion

Efforts to expand production beyond the US included France and Sweden's plans to double ammunition and explosives capacity by 2025, and increase powder capacity by 10 times by 2026. Other expansions (factories in Germany, Romania, etc.; 700,000 shell and 10,000t powder/year goals; ASAP targets for 2 million shells by 2025) are also confirmed.

Industry partnerships

US-Ukraine and international-Ukraine partnerships - including Northrop Grumman’s in-country production line, Amentum’s joint armored vehicle ventures, and the involvement of KNDS and Rheinmetall - are disclosed by both the U.S. DoD and the contractors themselves.

Activities and achievements

Notable deliveries and initiatives

Documentation from the DoD Fact Sheet and major news outlets provide explicit confirmation for the following:

- delivery of VAMPIRE counter-unmanned aerial systems, "FrankenSAM" conversions, T-72 tanks (joint U.S.-Dutch project), NASAMS, air-to-ground munitions for F-16s, 3D printers for field repair/logistics, and tele-maintenance efforts;
- establishment of joint sustainment frameworks, technical manual translation, and innovation-driven working group outputs in areas such as counter-UAS, maritime mine countermeasures, and rapid deployment manufacturing.

== NATO–Ukraine Council ==
NATO plans to invite Ukraine as a member into a new organization, the NATO–Ukraine Council.This organization was announced at NATO's July 2023 summit in Vilnius, Lithuania.

The inaugural meeting of the NATO-Ukraine Council happened on 12 July 2023 at the NATO's 2023 Vilnius Summit. The Council met at the level of Heads of State and Government, including the participation of Ukrainian President Volodymyr Zelenskyy.

== See also ==
- 2022 Ramstein Air Base meeting
- 2023 Ukrainian counteroffensive – Military operation during the Russo-Ukrainian war
- Coalition of the willing (Russo-Ukrainian war) – Group of countries in support of Ukrainian sovereignty
- European Union Military Assistance Mission in support of Ukraine – Active military training mission of the European Union
- Operation Interflex – British training mission in Ukraine
- Operation Unifier – Canadian Armed Forces operation in Ukraine
