= 2022 Ramstein Air Base meeting =

International conference organized by the United States

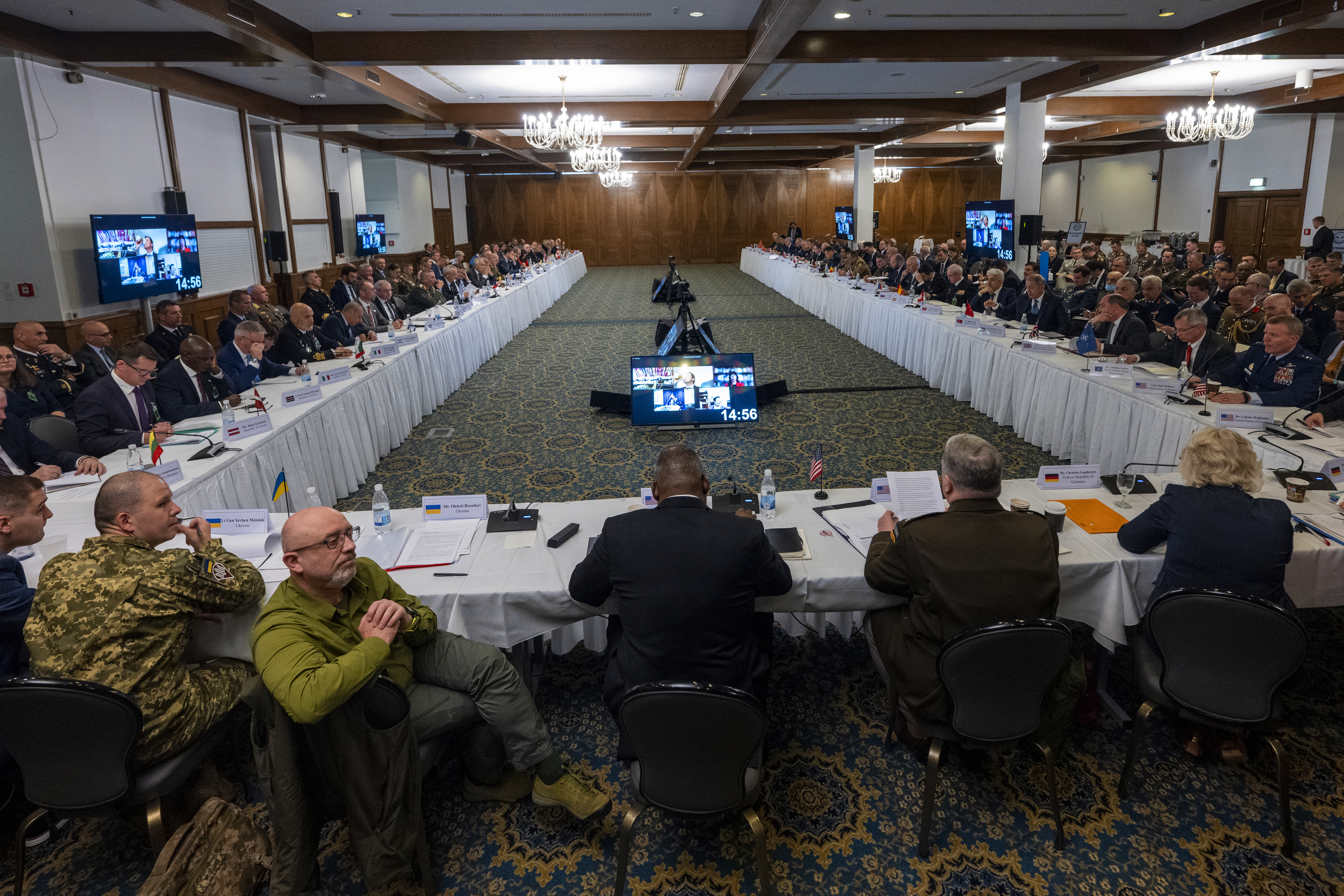
2022 Ramstein meeting

The Ramstein Air Base meeting was an international conference organized by the United States that took place on 26 April 2022 at the Ramstein Air Base in Germany. The purpose of the meeting was to discuss the Russian invasion of Ukraine, particularly Ukrainian defense capabilities, as well as pledge and coordinate further support to Ukraine – including after the war. Representatives and senior defense officials from more than 40 nations attended, the majority of them NATO and EU members, but also including countries in Africa and Asia.

The meeting was part of the Ukraine Defense Consultative Group, also known as the Ukraine Defense Contact Group, which has held 31 meetings, the most recent on 15 October 2025.

During the 2024 Washington NATO summit, Jens Stoltenberg announced that the NATO is forming a new command (NATO Security Assistance and Training for Ukraine) to plan, coordinate, and arrange delivery of security assistance that Ukraine needs to prevail in its fight today, and in the future.

== Participants and attendees ==
Over 40 nations were represented at the meeting, including both NATO and non-NATO members. All countries part of NATO and/or the European Union participated. Representatives from some nations, among them Israel and Qatar, participated at the meeting but did not appear on the official list of attendees. According to The Washington Post, the inclusion of non-NATO member countries like Japan, Kenya and Tunisia was "part of an effort to extend substantive and symbolic support for Ukraine beyond Europe and the alliance". Other non-NATO and non-EU attendees included Australia, Jordan, Liberia, Morocco, New Zealand and South Korea.

The conference was organized with less than a week's notice. Though not organized under NATO auspices, it was supposed to be attended by NATO Secretary General Jens Stoltenberg. However, he could not attend due to a cold. While most countries had attendees physically present, South Korea and Japan joined virtually.

== Dignitaries in attendance ==
- Ukraine – Defence Minister Oleksii Reznikov; Lt. Gen. Yevhen Moisiuk

=== NATO member states ===
- NATO – Assistant Secretary General for Operations Thomas Goffus
- Albania – Defence Minister Niko Peleshi
- Belgium – Defence Minister Ludivine Dedonder
- Bulgaria – Defence Minister Stefan Yanev
- Canada – National Defence Minister Anita Anand
- Croatia – Defence Minister Mario Banožić
- Czech Republic – Defence Minister Jana Černochová
- Denmark – Defence Minister Morten Bødskov
- Estonia – Defence Minister Kalle Laanet
- Finland – Defence Minister Antti Kaikkonen
- France – Minister of the Armed Forces Sébastien Lecornu
- Germany – Federal Minister of Defence Christine Lambrecht
- Greece – Minister for National Defence Nikolaos Panagiotopoulos
- Hungary – Minister of Defence Tibor Benkő
- Iceland – Minister for Foreign Affairs Þórdís Kolbrún R. Gylfadóttir
- Italy – Minister of Defence Lorenzo Guerini; ADM Giuseppe Cavo Dragone
- Latvia – Defence Minister Artis Pabriks
- Lithuania – Minister for National Defence Arvydas Anušauskas
- Luxembourg – Defence Minister François Bausch
- Montenegro – Defence Minister Raško Konjević
- Netherlands – Defence Minister Kajsa Ollongren
- North Macedonia – Defence Minister Slavjanka Petrovska
- Norway – Defence Minister Bjørn Arild Gram
- Poland – Minister of National Defence Mariusz Błaszczak
- Portugal – Minister of National Defence Helena Carreiras
- Romania – Minister of National Defence Vasile Dîncu
- Slovakia – Defence Minister Jaroslav Naď
- Slovenia – Defence Minister Matej Tonin
- Spain – Defence Minister Margarita Robles
- Turkey – Minister of National Defence Hulusi Akar
- United Kingdom – Defence Minister Ben Wallace; Timothy Fraser
- United States – Secretary of Defense Lloyd Austin; Chairman of the Joint Chiefs of Staff Mark Milley; Gen. Tod Wolters; Dr. Celeste Wallander

=== Asia-Pacific partners ===
- Australia – Defence Minister Richard Marles
- Japan – Defense Minister Nobuo Kishi
- New Zealand – Defence Minister Peeni Henare
- South Korea – Minister of National Defence Suh Wook

=== Middle Eastern partners ===
- Israel – Brig.-Gen. (Res.) Dror Shalom
- Jordan – Defence Minister Bisher Al-Khasawneh
- Qatar – Minister of Defense Khalid bin Mohammad Al Attiyah

=== African partners ===
- Kenya – Lt. Gen Jonah Mwangi
- Liberia – Minister of National Defense Daniel Dee Ziankahn
- Morocco – Delegate-Ministry for the Administration of National Defense Abdellatif Loudiyi
- Tunisia – Defence Minister Farhat Horchani

== Meeting ==
At the meeting, Ukraine is said to have outlined its defense needs. Several nations announced new shipments of heavy weapons to Ukraine at Ramstein, including Germany and Canada.

U.S. Secretary of Defense Lloyd Austin, the organizer of the meeting, having visited Kyiv days earlier told the meeting that his "visit only underscored my sense of urgency, an urgency that I know that we all share", stating he would like "this whole group today to leave with a common and transparent understanding of Ukraine's near-term security requirements because we're going to keep moving heaven and earth so that we can meet them." Behind closed doors, general Mark Milley is reported to have stated that "the next two, three, four weeks will shape the overall outcome of this fight", stating "time is not on Ukraine's side". Austin also stated that the conference sought "to help Ukraine win the fight against Russia's unjust invasion and to build up Ukraine's defenses for tomorrow's challenges", and that "we do want to make it harder for Russia to threaten its neighbors and make it less able to do that." Austin also made a comment regarding a series of attacks that started the day before the meeting on 25 April in the Russian-backed breakaway republic of Transnistria, internationally recognized as part of Moldova. He more specifically declared that he was "not really sure what that's all about, but it's something that we will stay focused on".

Against a backdrop of domestic and international pressure, the German defence minister Christine Lambrecht announced at Ramstein that Gepard self-propelled anti-aircraft weapons were to be offered to Ukraine from industry stocks, stating "Germany, together with its allies, stands firmly at the side of its Ukrainian friends who are in dire need". This marked a major change in German policy, having previously hesitated in sending heavy weapons to Ukraine. Lambrecht also stated Ukrainian soldiers would be trained on the systems on German soil.

== Aftermath and reactions ==
According to Secretary of Defense Austin, the conference is to be transformed into a monthly "contact group" on Ukraine's self-defense. Part of its focus is to organize co-operation in the fields of industry, to deal "with the tremendous demand that we're facing for munitions and weapons platforms". It is to be open to any country willing to contribute to Ukrainian defense capabilities, and it is expected by the U.S. that more nations will join the upcoming meetings virtually.

After the meeting, the Ukrainian minister of defence, Oleksii Reznikov stated on Twitter that "We need weapons. Modern weapons. A large number of modern heavy weapons". He also called the conference a "momentous meeting", and that "tectonic philosophical shifts have occurred".

Marcel Dirsus, a nonresident fellow at the Institute for Security Policy at Kiel University, called the German statements at Ramstein a "strong signal" from Germany, after a recent string of contradictory statements and perceived reluctance.

The former Ukrainian ambassador to the United States, Volodymyr Yelchenko, has stated that the meeting may have marked the official founding of an "Anti-Putin Coalition". Ukrainian political scientist and Vice-Rector of the Ukrainian Catholic University, Dmytro Sherenhovskyy, stated that the meeting marked significant changes in international security architecture.

According to Euromaidan Press, "in some sense the Ramstein meeting demonstrates a gradual increase in the national leaders' readiness to take responsibility in global leadership", also stating that "the meeting at the US Air Force base Ramstein has already been called historic for Ukraine."

== Subsequent meetings ==
	Date	Host	Chair	Location	Ref.
1	26 April 2022	United States	Lloyd Austin	Ramstein Air Base	
2	23 May 2022	United States	Lloyd Austin	Virtual	
3	15 June 2022	United States	Lloyd Austin	NATO headquarters	
4	20 July 2022	United States	Lloyd Austin	Virtual	
5	8 September 2022	United States	Lloyd Austin	Ramstein Air Base	
6	12 October 2022	United States	Lloyd Austin	NATO headquarters	
7	16 November 2022	United States	Lloyd Austin	Virtual	
8	20 January 2023	United States	Lloyd Austin	Ramstein Air Base	
9	14 February 2023	United States	Lloyd Austin	NATO headquarters	
10	15 March 2023	United States	Lloyd Austin	Virtual	
11	21 April 2023	United States	Lloyd Austin	Ramstein Air Base	
12	25 May 2023	United States	Lloyd Austin	Virtual	
13	15 June 2023	United States	Lloyd Austin	NATO headquarters	
14	18 July 2023	United States	Lloyd Austin	Virtual	
15	19 September 2023	United States	Lloyd Austin	Ramstein Air Base	
16	11 October 2023	United States	Lloyd Austin	NATO headquarters	
17	22 November 2023	United States	Lloyd Austin	Virtual	
18	23 January 2024	United States	Lloyd Austin	Virtual	
19	14 February 2024	United States	Lloyd Austin	NATO headquarters	
20	19 March 2024	United States	Lloyd Austin	Ramstein Air Base	
21	26 April 2024	United States	Lloyd Austin	Virtual	
22	20 May 2024	United States	Lloyd Austin	Virtual	
23	13 June 2024	United States	Lloyd Austin	NATO headquarters	
24	6 September 2024	United States	Lloyd Austin	Ramstein Air Base	
25	9 January 2025	United States	Lloyd Austin	Ramstein Air Base	
26	12 February 2025	United Kingdom	John Healey	NATO headquarters	
27	11 April 2025	United Kingdom	John Healey	Ramstein Air Base	

== See also ==
- Coalition of the willing (Russo-Ukrainian War)
- Ukraine Defense Contact Group
- Ukraine Security Assistance Initiative
