= Thomas Goffus =

American government official

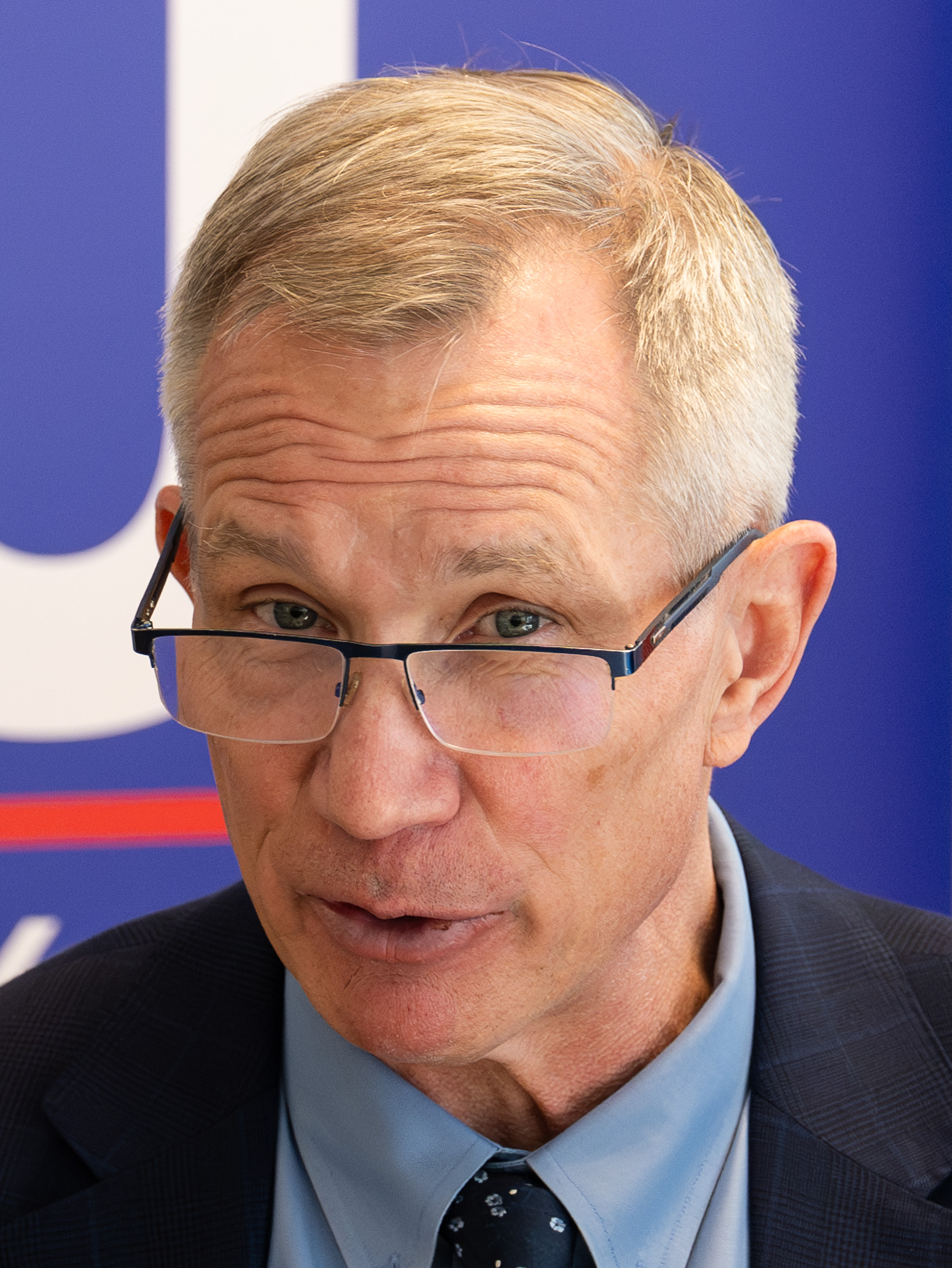
- Thomas Goffus at the Informal EU-NATO event on Counterterrorism in 2024

NATO Assistant Secretary General for Operations
- Incumbent
- Assumed office January 2022

Deputy Assistant Secretary of Defense for Europe and NATO
- In office May 10, 2017 – October 2018
- President: Donald Trump

Personal details
- Party: Republican

Thomas William Goffus is a former American government official currently serving as NATO's Assistant Secretary General for Operations. Goffus was the Deputy Assistant Secretary of Defense for European and NATO Policy from May 2017 until October 2018. In this role he was responsible for the U.S. Department of Defense relationship between the United States, NATO, the EU and the nations of Europe for Secretary Jim Mattis.

== DASD ==
In January 2018, Secretary James N. Mattis released the National Defense Strategy (NDS) which places the order of priorities for the Department of Defense as China, Russia, North Korea, Iran and counter-terrorism. As the DASD for Europe and NATO, Goffus was responsible for NDS implementation as it relates to those countries and the combined effort to counter those adversaries.

== Congressional staffer ==
Goffus was previously a staff member for the Senate Armed Services Committee (SASC), as the lead advisor to the chairman on matters relating to national military strategy, counterterrorism, international defense cooperation and foreign policy issues in the U.S. European Command and U.S. Central Command. Goffus returned to the Senate after resigning from the Pentagon to become the staff director for Senate Armed Service Committee (SASC) chairman Senator James Inhofe.

== Military career ==
Goffus joined the staff of the SASC after a career in the United States Air Force. While in the Air Force, he commanded a squadron and served as an F-22 operational test manager. He was responsible for performing nuclear command and control as well as supervising missile warning, global strike, space, missile defense and intelligence, surveillance, and reconnaissance operations.

Goffus was stationed in Okinawa (Japan) and Larissa (Greece). He graduated from the NATO Senior Officer's Course at the NATO Defense College in Rome, Italy. He participated in Operation Provide Comfort from Incirlik, Turkey, and in Operation Southern Watch from Dhahran, Saudi Arabia.

== Education ==
Goffus earned a B.S. in aeronautical engineering from the United States Air Force Academy in 1985, an M.S. from the University of Washington in aerospace and aeronautical engineering, an M.A. from the United States Naval War College, and is a graduate of the NATO Defense College.
