= Government and intergovernmental reactions to the Russian invasion of Ukraine =

International reactions to the Russian invasion of Ukraine Countries that have condemned the invasion Countries that have maintained a neutral stance Countries that have supported the invasion or blamed the invasion on Ukraine and/or NATO provocation Unknown ¨ Russia Ukraine

Votes on the UN General Assembly resolution to condemn Russia for its invasion of Ukraine In favor Against Abstained Absent Non-UN member

The 2022 Russian invasion of Ukraine received widespread international condemnation, leading to new sanctions being imposed on Russia, which triggered a Russian financial crisis. Reactions among governments have most often been negative, with criticism and condemnation, particularly in Europe, the Americas, and Southeast Asia.

International organizations such as the United Nations (UN) and the North Atlantic Treaty Organization (NATO) have also voiced significant criticism of the invasion, over it not having justifiable precedent. From the early phases of the invasion, the United Nations General Assembly voted to condemn Russia for its invasion of Ukraine.

== Ukraine ==
Ukrainian President Volodymyr Zelenskyy called for nations to either establish a no-fly zone over Ukraine or provide Ukraine with air support. Zelenskyy also called for "peace", stating that he does not "want Ukraine's history to be a legend about 300 Spartans." Zelenskyy, in an address to the British House of Commons, also invoked the words of Winston Churchill by saying "We will fight at sea; we will fight in the air; we will protect our land. We will fight everywhere ... and we will not surrender."

Ukrainian officials have published photos and videos of killed and captured Russian soldiers. Some experts have argued that Article 13 of the Third Geneva Convention prohibits videos of captured soldiers.

On 2 April, Zelenskyy warned Ukrainian residents that Russian forces retreating from around Kyiv were "mining the whole territory. They are mining homes, mining equipment, even the bodies of people who were killed", and leaving behind "a lot of trip wires, a lot of other dangers."

== Russia ==
On 26 February 2022, the Russian communications regulator, Roskomnadzor, ordered independent media outlets to take down reports that described the Russian invasion of Ukraine as an "assault, invasion, or declaration of war", threatening fines and blocks. From 1 March, Russian schools started war-themed social studies classes for teenagers based on the Russian government's position on history; one teaching manual (publicized by independent media outlet MediaZona) asserted that "genocide" had been occurring in eastern Ukraine for eight years, and that Russia was responding with a "special peacekeeping operation" in Ukraine, which was "not a war".

Russian President Vladimir Putin on 4 March declared that Russia had "absolutely no ill intentions with regard to our neighbors". Putin called for other countries to "think about normalizing relations and cooperating normally", stating there was "no need to escalate the situation, impose restrictions". On 5 March he criticized Ukraine for resisting the invasion, saying, "they are calling into question the future of Ukrainian statehood." Also that day, the Russian Ministry of Foreign Affairs urged the countries of the European Union and NATO to "stop pumping weapons" to Ukraine, claiming that terrorists might use the weapons against airplanes.

On 7 March, the Russian government adopted a list of countries and regions "taking unfriendly actions against Russia, Russian companies, and citizens" – Albania, Andorra, Australia, United Kingdom, (Note: This includes Jersey, Anguilla, British Virgin Islands and Gibraltar.) all European Union states, Iceland, Canada, Liechtenstein, the Federated States of Micronesia, Monaco, New Zealand, Norway, South Korea, San Marino, North Macedonia, Singapore, United States, Taiwan, Ukraine, Montenegro, Switzerland, and Japan.

Putin on 8 March declared that Russian "conscript soldiers are not participating in hostilities" in Ukraine "and will not participate in them". On 9 March, the Russian Ministry of Defense stated that it had "discovered" Russian conscript soldiers participating in the military operation in Ukraine, and that "almost all" of these conscripts had returned to Russia, but some other conscripts had been "captured" in Ukraine.

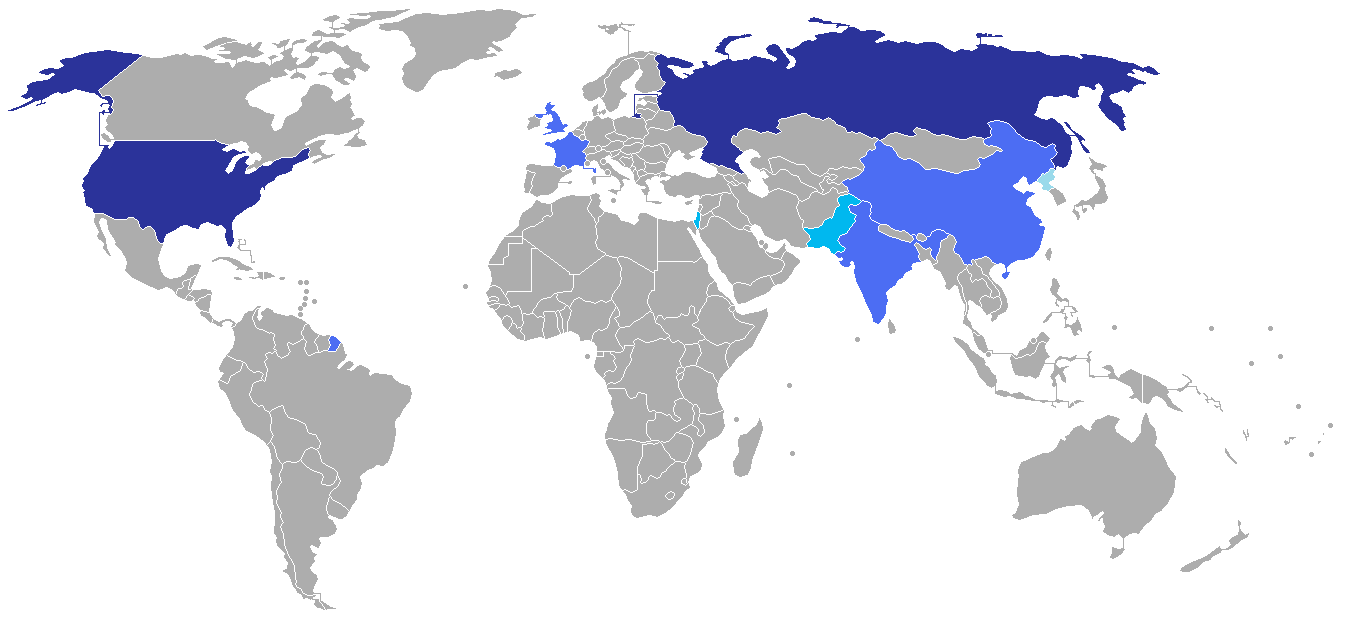
Russia and the US control 90% of the world's nuclear weapons. Putin warned that "whoever tries to hinder us" in Ukraine would see consequences "you have never seen in your history".

On 9 March, Russia bombed a maternity hospital in Mariupol; Associated Press journalists on the scene took photos and videos of multiple bloodstained, pregnant mothers leaving the blown-out maternity ward. One pregnant woman and her baby died after the bombing. Russian officials provided different, shifting stances on the bombing. Kremlin spokesman Dmitry Peskov initially stated that Russia does "not fire on civilian targets", then later said he lacked "clear information about what happened". Foreign Minister Sergey Lavrov criticized "pathetic shouting about so-called atrocities", stating that the hospital had no patients and doctors. According to him, it was controlled by Ukrainian extremists. Russia's Defense Ministry denied bombing the hospital, and accused Ukraine of staging the bombing. Russian officials called images of the attack "fake news" and labelled a pregnant woman pictured fleeing the bombed hospital as an actor.

On 16 March, a Russian airstrike hit a theatre in Mariupol containing hundreds of civilians; satellite pictures three days prior showed large words "DETI" ("children" in Russian) displayed as a signal to Russian forces about those inside the theatre. Russia's military denied bombing the theatre. Russia's foreign ministry said that it was a "lie" that Russia bombed the theatre, insisting that "Russia's armed forces don't bomb towns and cities". During the invasion, Russia used airstrikes against Ukrainian cities including Mariupol, Kyiv and Kharkiv.

On 16 March, Putin gave a speech calling Russian opponents of the war "scum and traitors," saying that "natural and necessary self-cleansing of society will only strengthen our country."

On 25 March, the leader of the Russian military's General Staff Main Operational Directorate, Sergei Rudskoi, stated that the first stage of the operation had "generally been accomplished", and the "combat potential of the Armed Forces of Ukraine (was) considerably reduced", allowing Russia "to focus our core efforts on achieving the main goal, the liberation of Donbas" in eastern Ukraine. A day later, Russian forces bombed Lviv, a city in western Ukraine.

Countries that have banned Russian aircraft from their airspace. Russia's retaliatory ban on aircraft from 36 countries changed global airline routes.

On 1 April, Russia accused Ukraine of conducting an airstrike on Russian territory; this was the first such accusation since the start of the Russian invasion. Russia said that an airstrike on a fuel depot in Belgorod had upset the peace negotiations with Ukraine.

After Russian forces occupied Bucha, Kyiv Oblast for five weeks and then withdrew, they were accused by Bucha officials of extrajudicial killings of Bucha residents. Russia's Ministry of Defense responded on 3 April that "not a single local resident suffered from any violent actions" during the Russian occupation of Bucha. This claim was contradicted by many eyewitness accounts by Bucha residents.

The Russian Ministry of Defence suggested that corpses of dead civilians had been placed on the streets of Bucha after "all Russian units withdrew completely" from the city on 30 March, but satellite photos were taken by Maxar Technologies showed that at least 11 body-sized objects on Bucha's Yablonska Street appeared between 9 and 11 March, remaining there for more than three weeks, in the same positions as 11 civilian corpses in a 1 April video. A high-ranking Russian official, Mikhail Ulyanov, claimed that Bucha's mayor Anatoliy Fedoruk did not discuss "dead bodies in the streets" in a 31 March video, but Fedoruk on 7 March had already done so, and on 28 March, accused Russian forces of killings and rapes in Bucha.

RIA Novosti, a media outlet controlled and owned by the Russian government, published an article by Timofey Sergeytsev that declared that "Nazis who took weapons must be killed in numbers as much as possible", while "most of the [Ukrainian] people are guilty, they are passive Nazis, Nazi enablers ... and must be punished". The article also stated that Ukraine "may develop only in dependency to Russia", and that "history has proven Ukraine may not exist as a national state". On 5 April 2022, Russia's opposition politician Alexei Navalny said the "monstrosity of lies" in the Russian state media "is unimaginable. And, unfortunately, so is its persuasiveness for those who have no access to alternative information." He tweeted that "warmongers" among Russian state media personalities "should be treated as war criminals. From the editors-in-chief to the talk show hosts to the news editors, [they] should be sanctioned now and tried someday." In July 2022, Alexei Gorinov, a member of the Krasnoselsky district council in Moscow, was sentenced to seven years in prison after making anti-war comments at a council meeting in March, including stating that "our country has aggressively attacked a neighbouring country" and "kids in Ukraine are dying each day". Lawyer Pavel Chikov said that this was the first jail term under the new Russian 2022 war censorship laws.

== Other countries ==
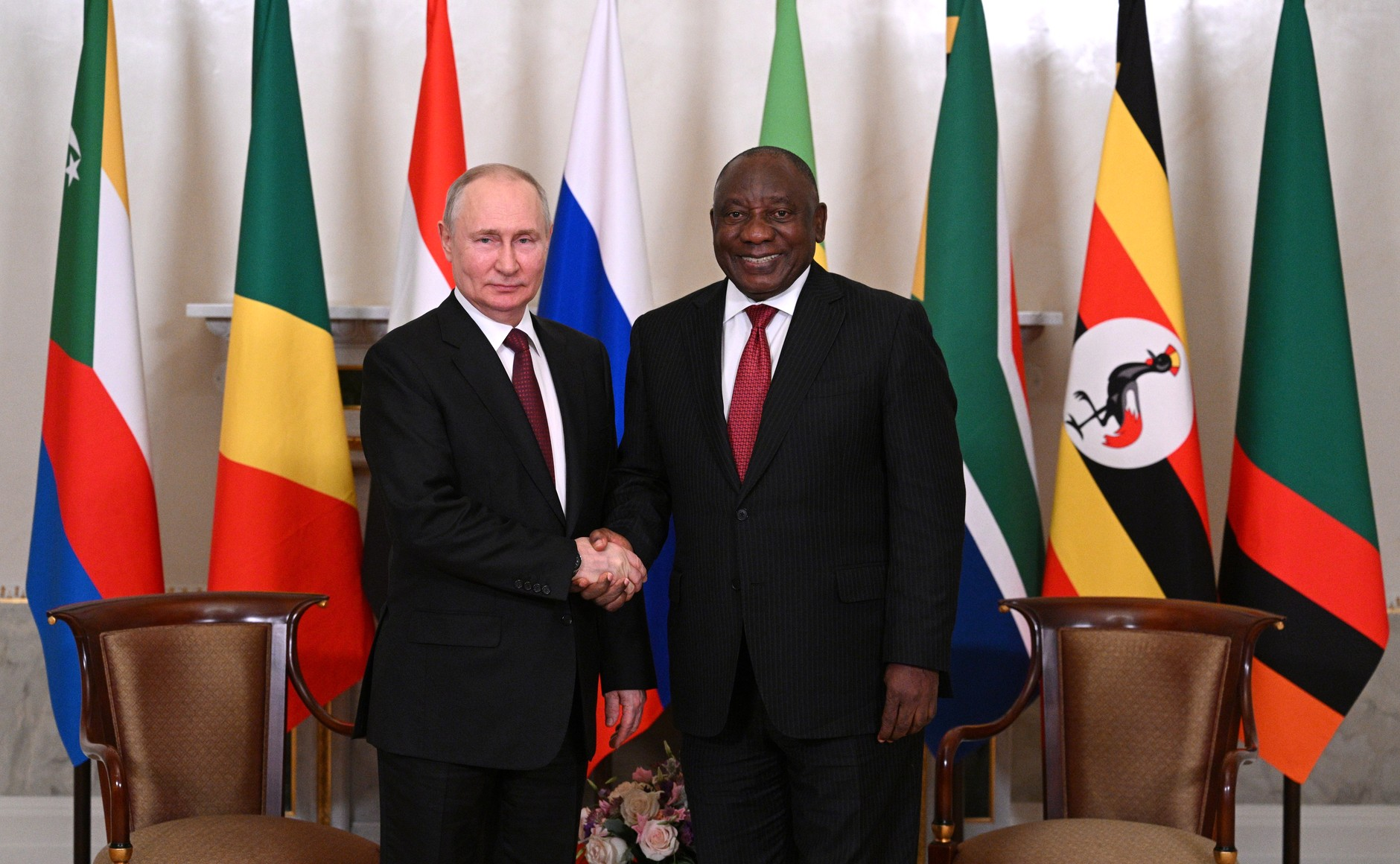
South African President Cyril Ramaphosa promoted the African peace plan

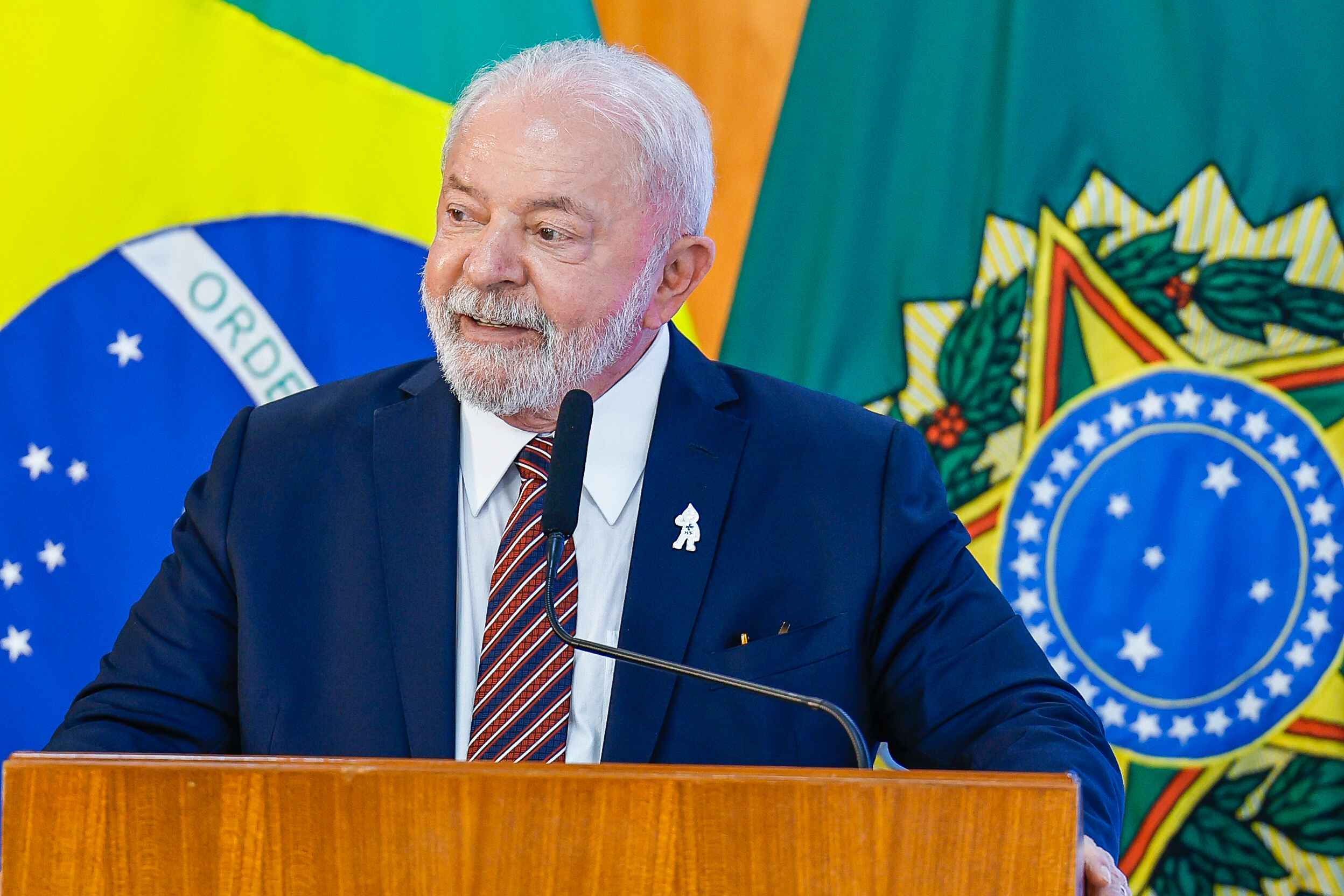
In April 2023, Brazilian President Luiz Inácio Lula da Silva condemned Russia's violation of Ukraine's territorial integrity and said Russia should withdraw from Ukrainian territory it has occupied since February 2022.

Russia Countries on Russia's "Unfriendly countries list". Countries and territories on the list imposed sanctions on Russia following the Russian invasion of Ukraine in 2022.

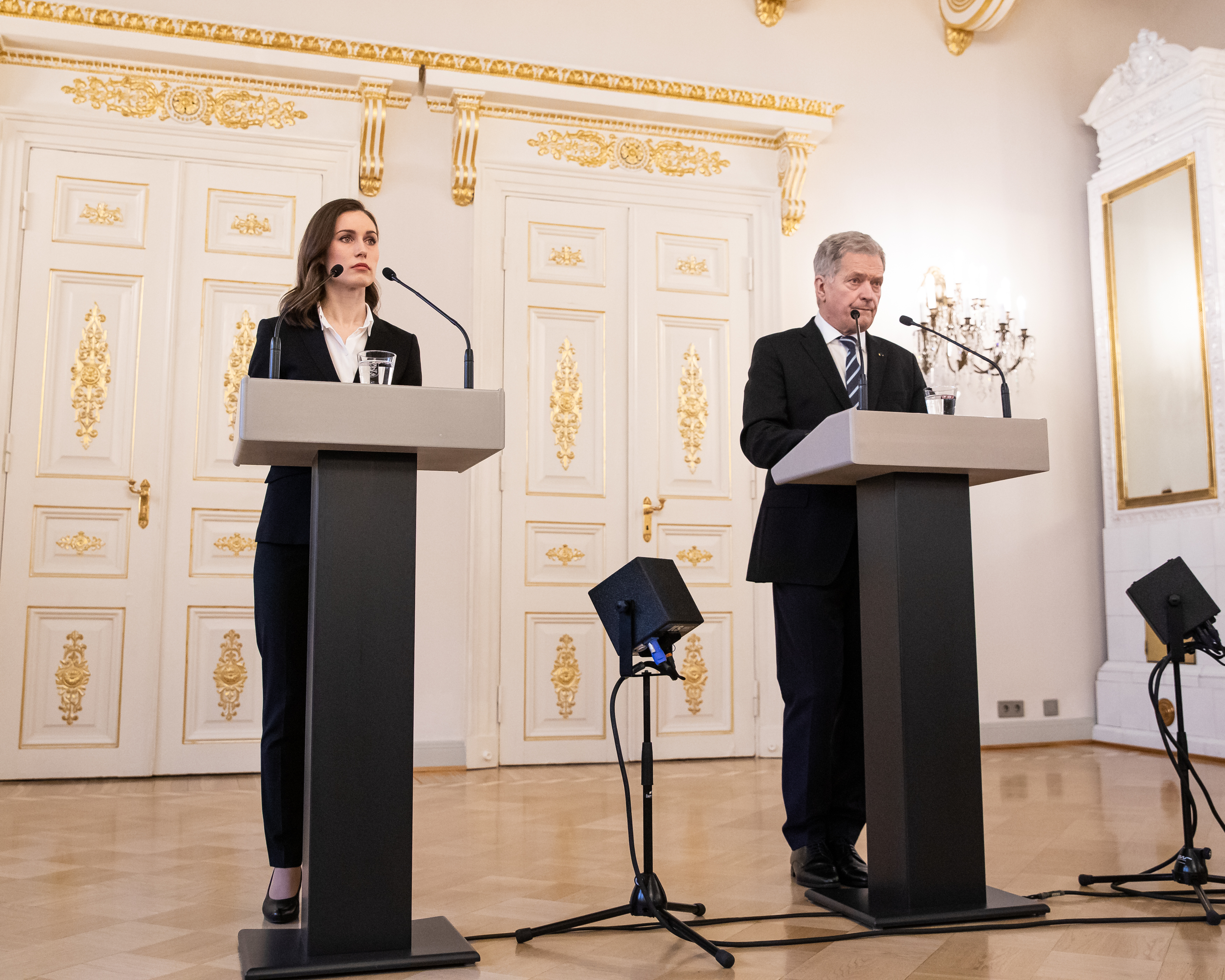
Finnish President Sauli Niinistö and Prime Minister Sanna Marin at a press conference about the situation of Ukraine, 24 February 2022

Statement by Jean-Yves Le Drian following his interview with Sviatlana Tsikhanouskaya, leader of the Belarusian opposition

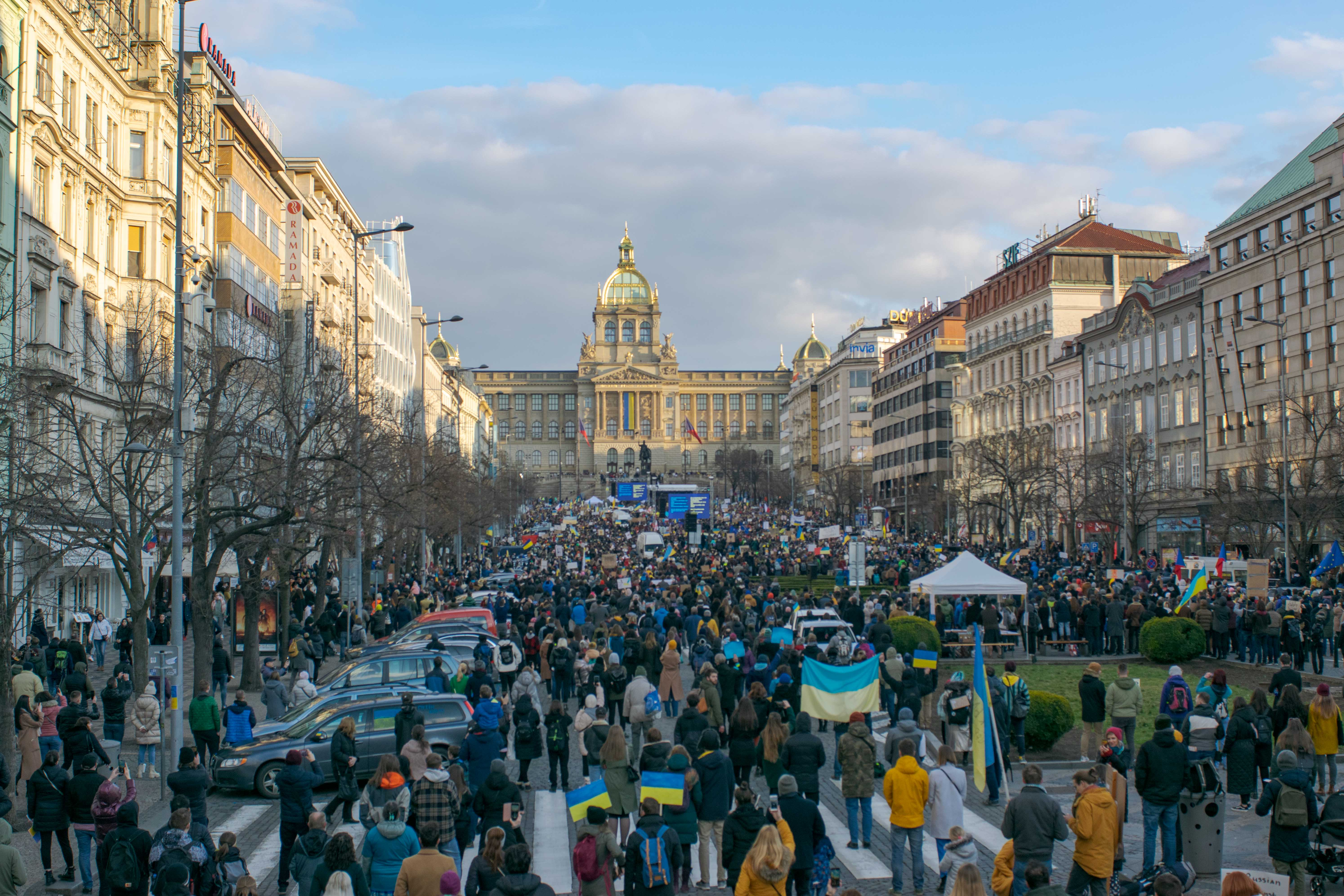
Support demonstration in Prague, 27 February 2022

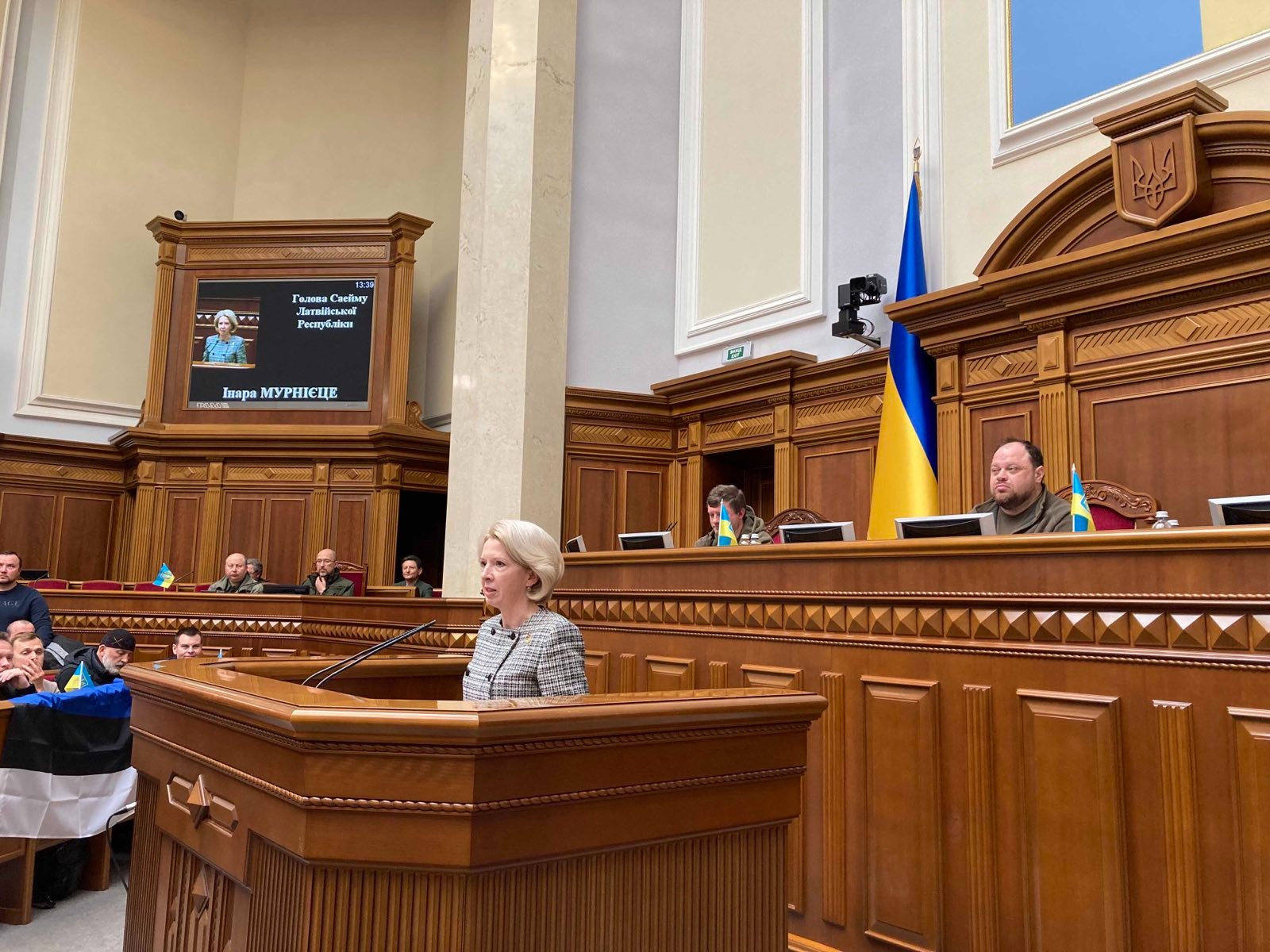
Speaker of the Saeima Ināra Mūrniece addressing the Verkhovna Rada on 24 March 2022.

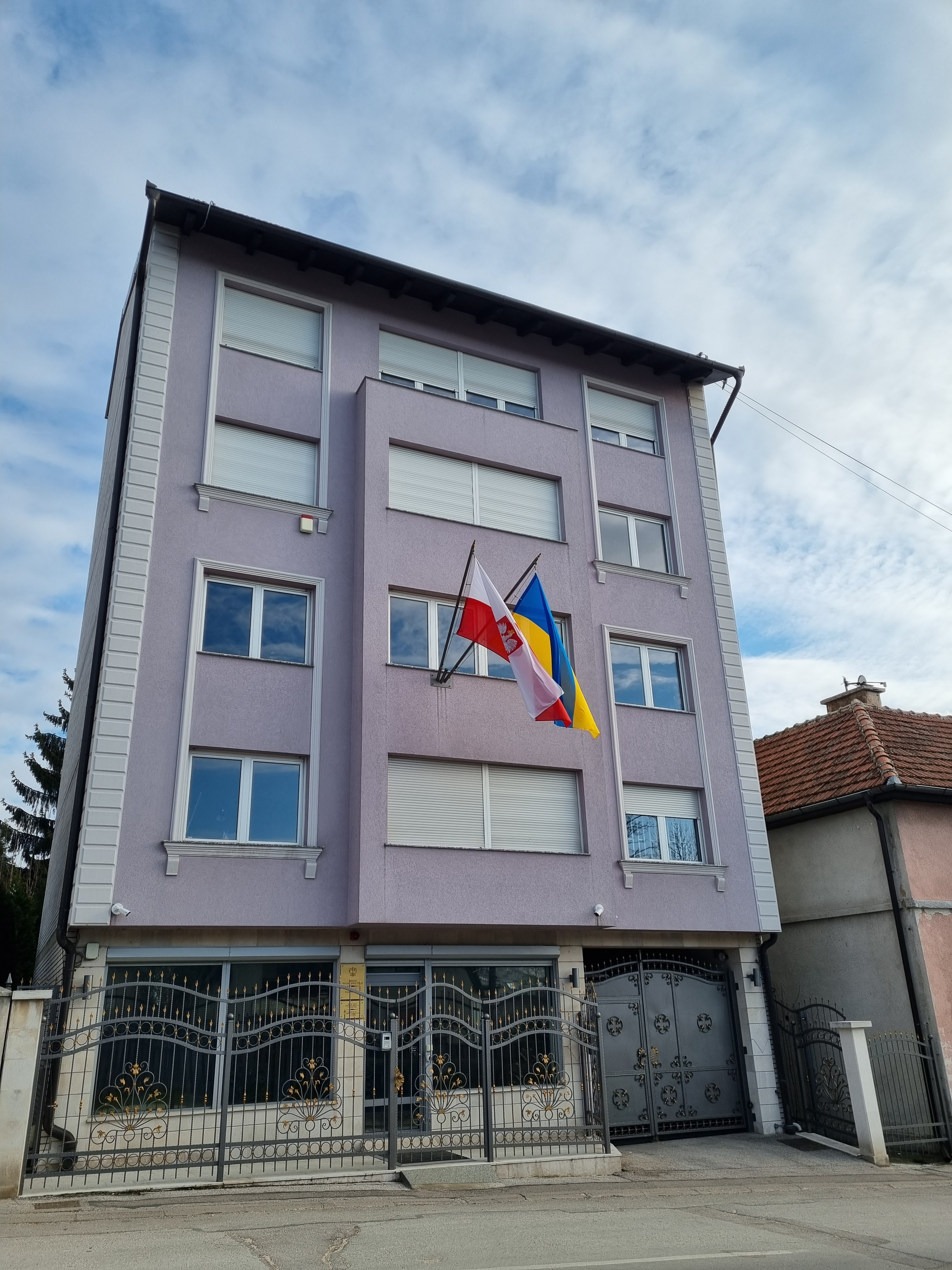
Ukrainian flag on the Polish Embassy in Sarajevo

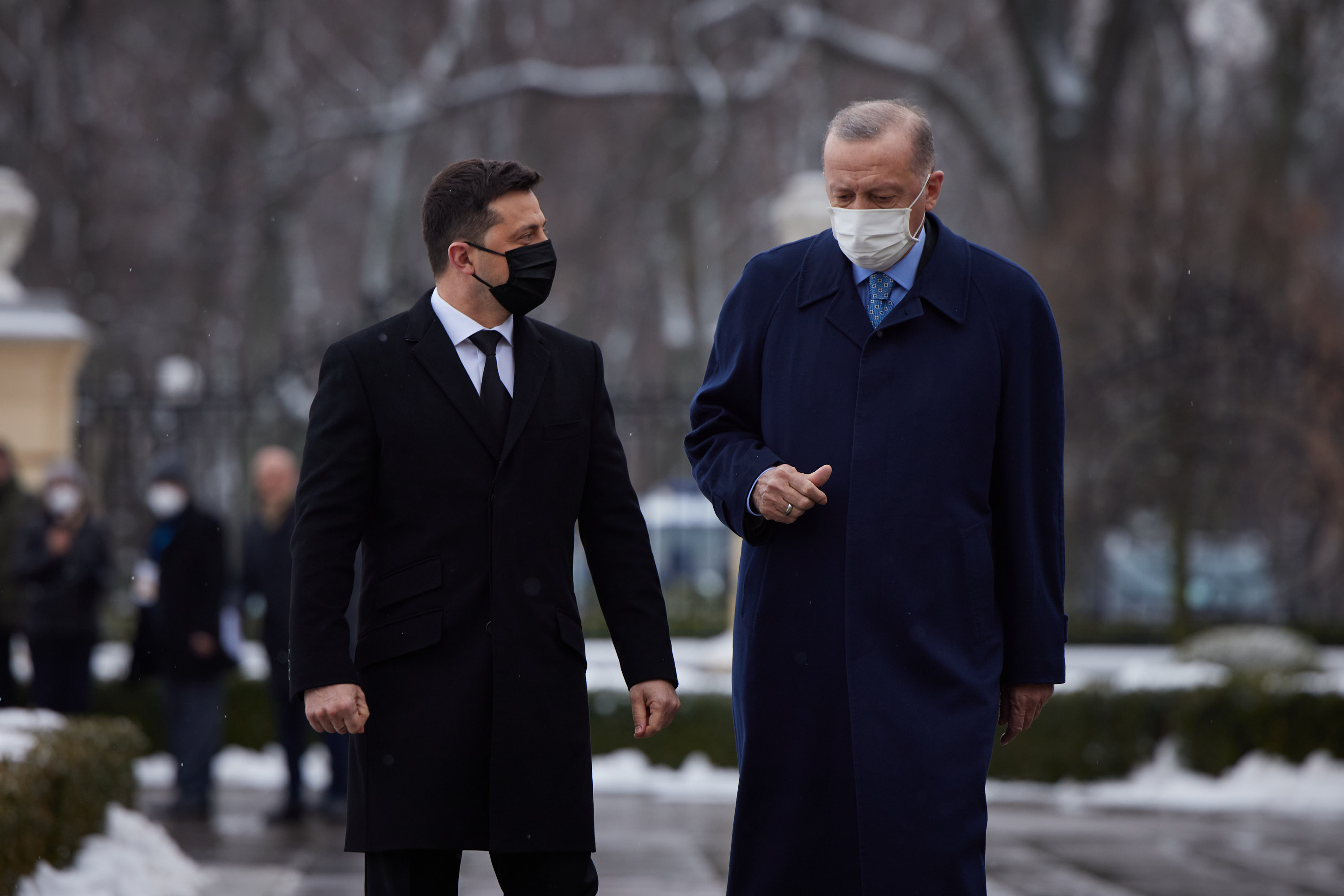
Recep Tayyip Erdoğan visiting Ukraine on the verge of the 2022 invasion.

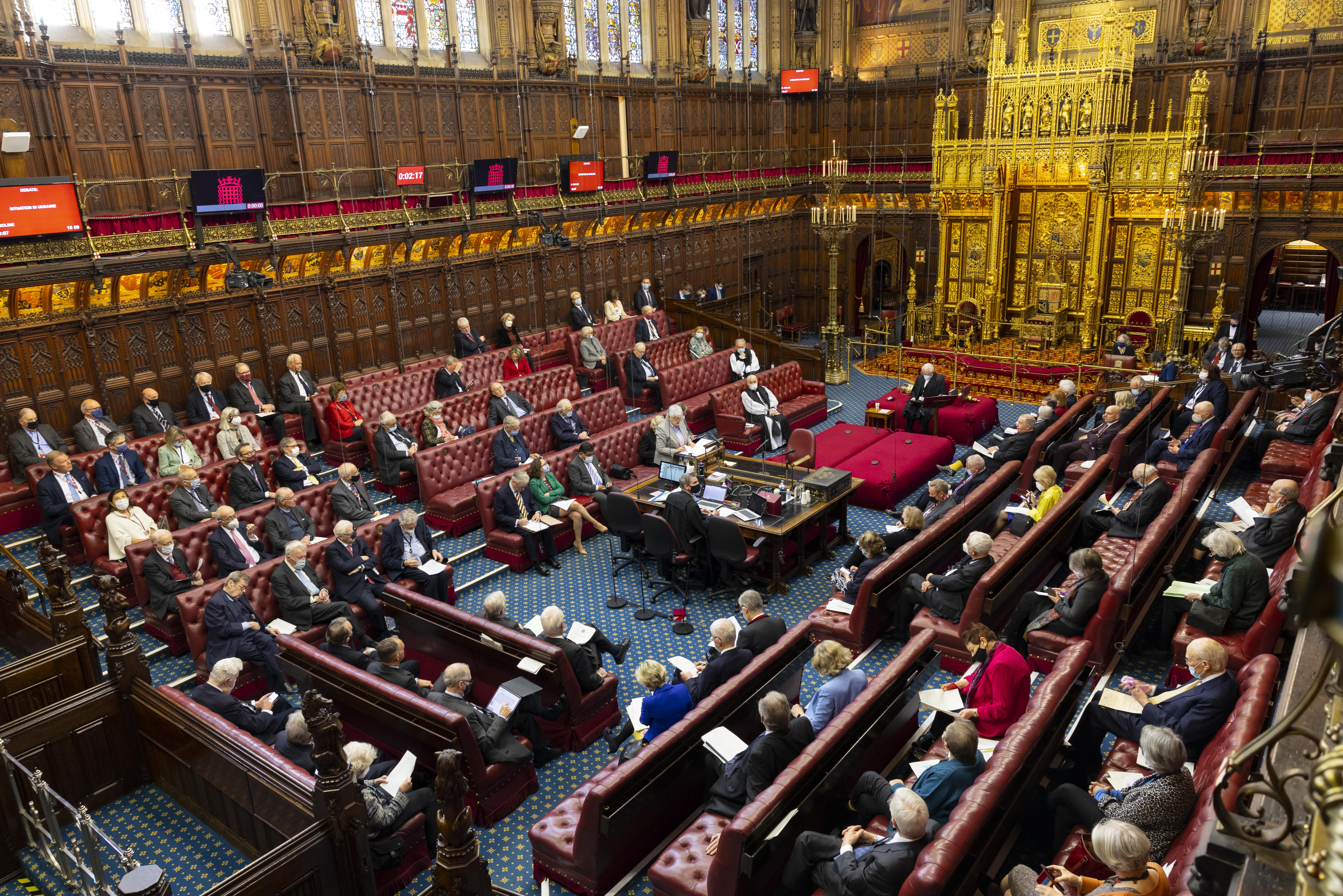
The U.K. House of Lords debated the situation of Ukraine on 25 February 2022.

Scottish Government debate on Ukraine, 24 February 2022

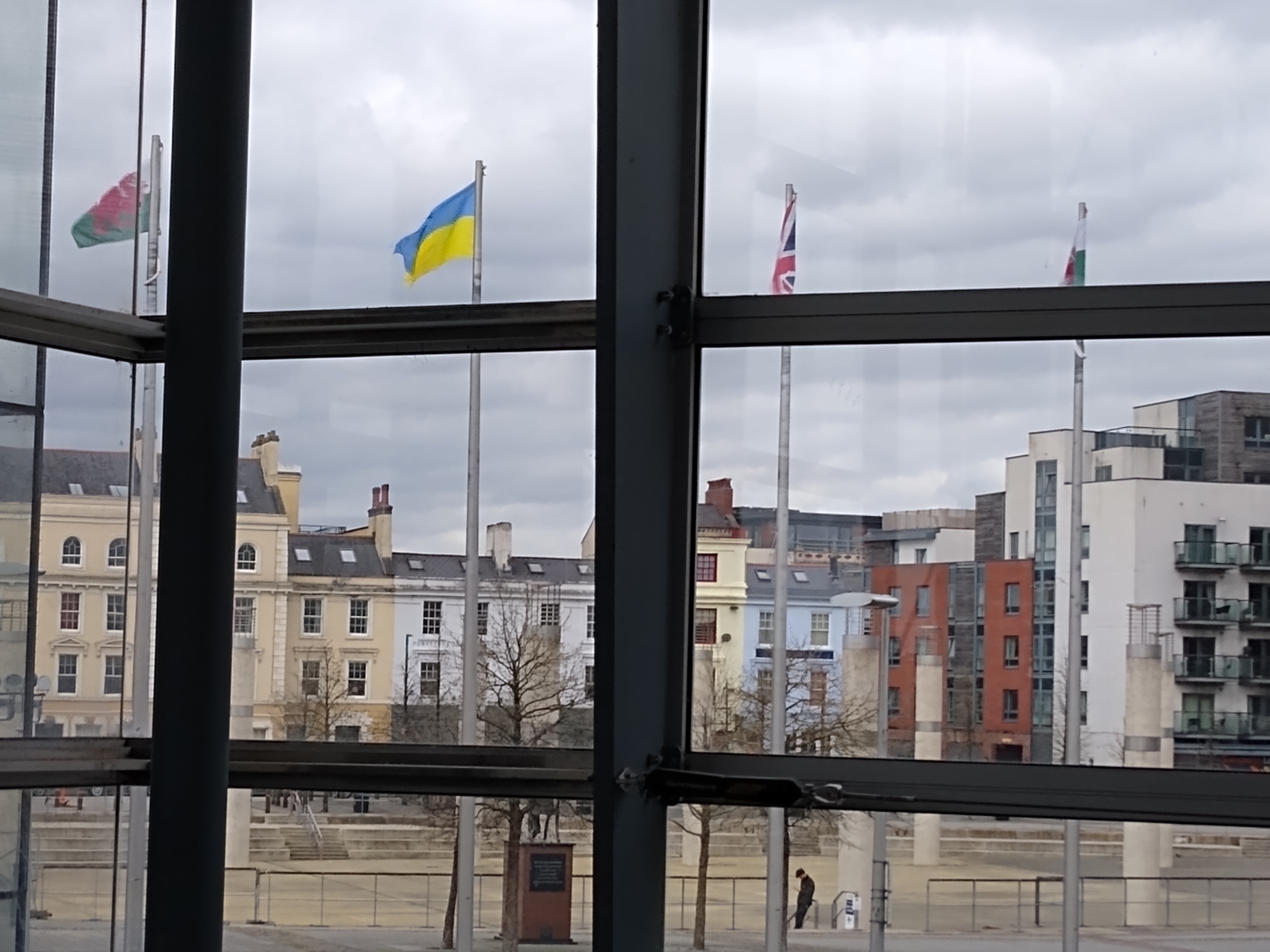
Ukrainian flag outside the Senedd building in Wales

Joe Biden's statement on the 2022 Russian invasion

=== Condemns Russia ===
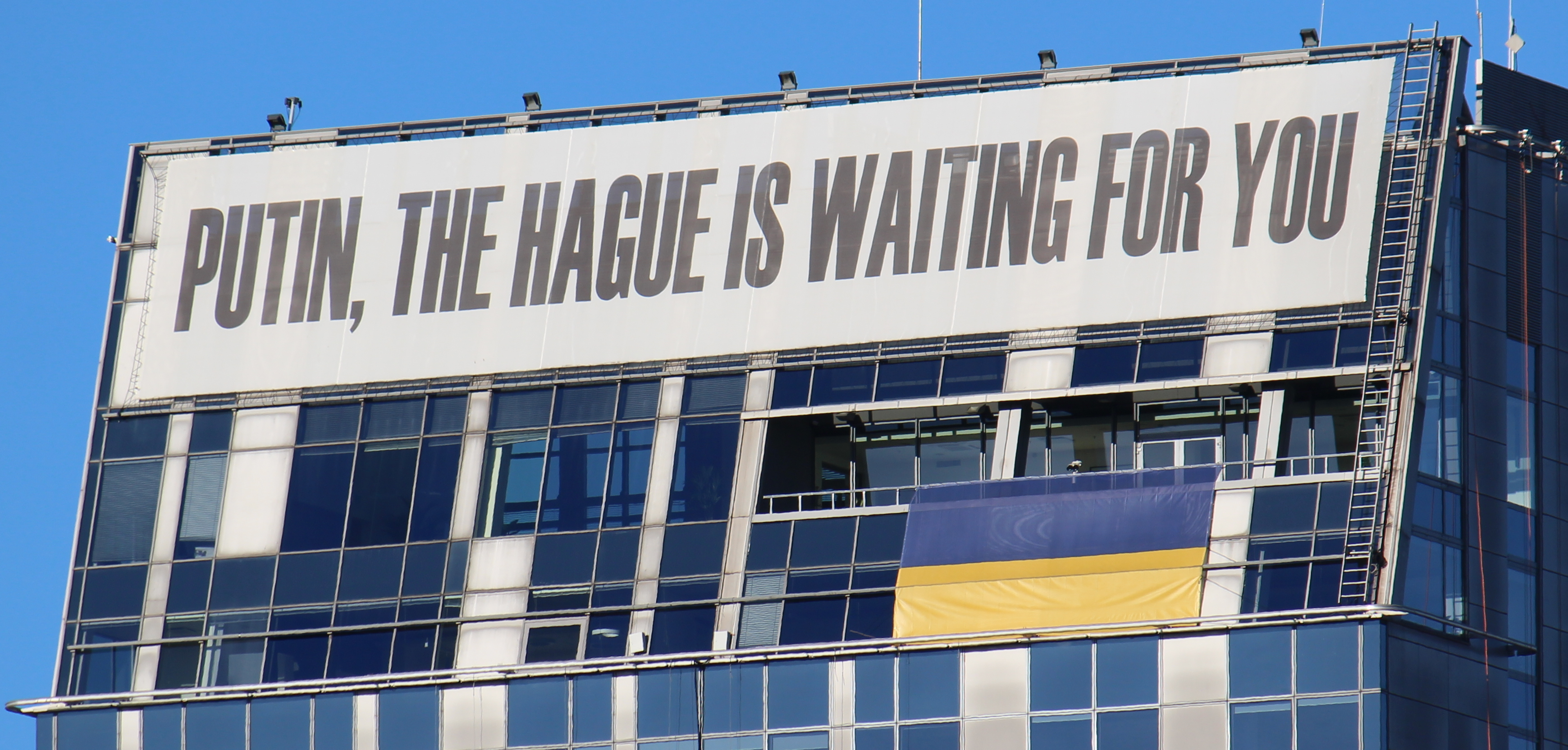
Vilnius City Municipality Building with a banner "Putin, The Hague is waiting for you" in Vilnius, Lithuania

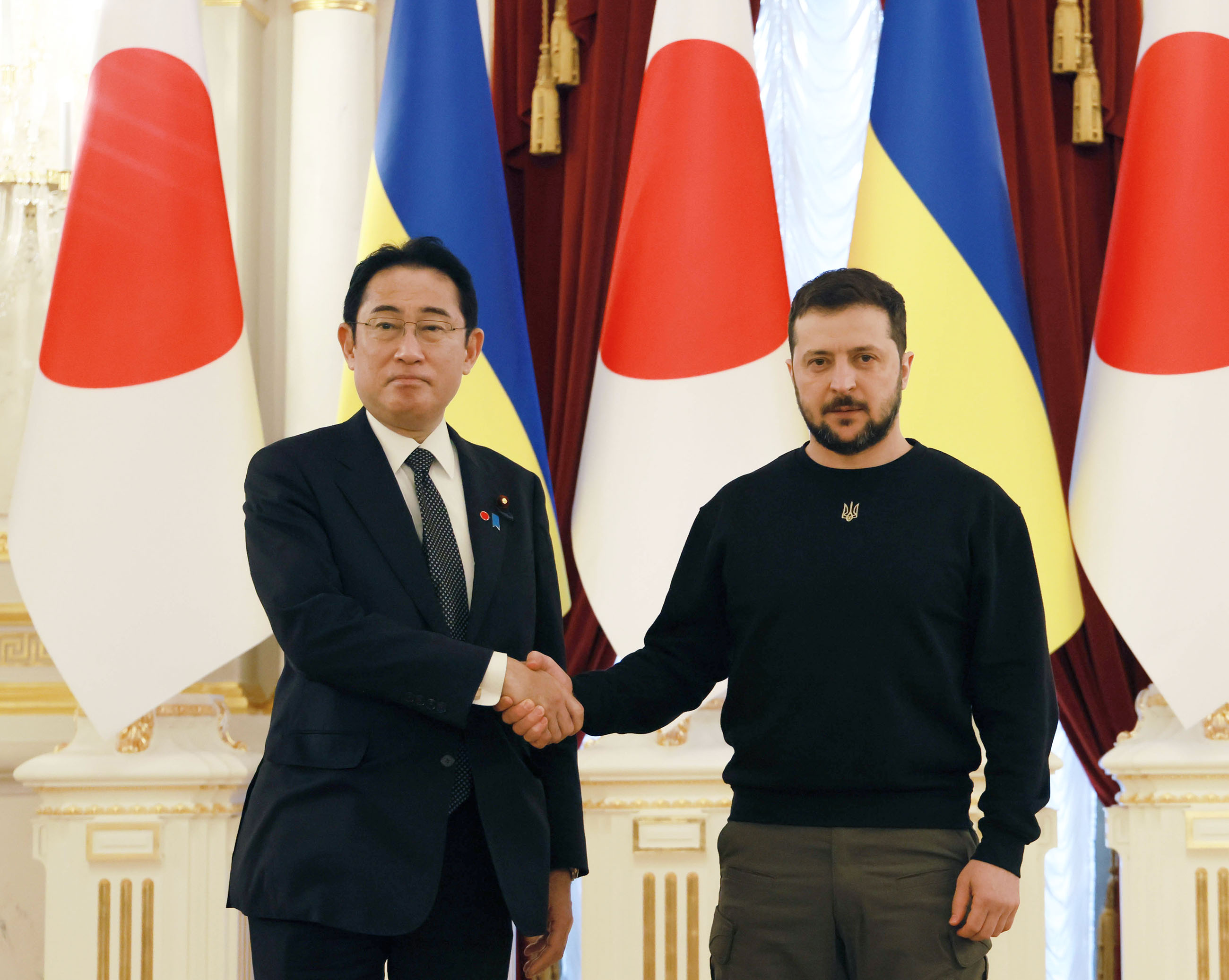
Zelenskyy with Japanese Prime Minister Fumio Kishida in Kyiv, Ukraine, 21 March 2023

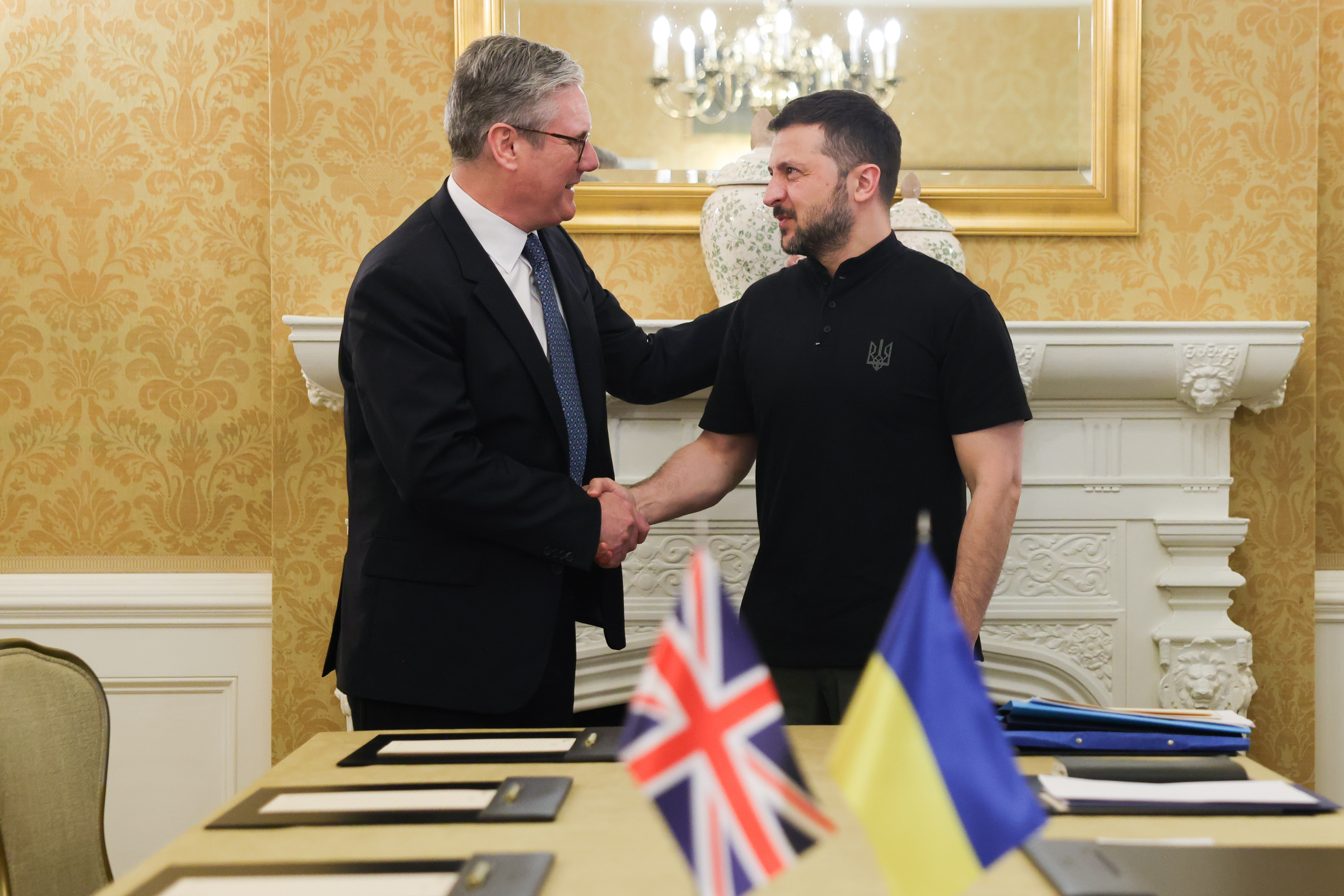
Zelenskyy with British Prime Minister Keir Starmer at the Washington NATO summit, 11 July 2024

| State | Notes |
|---|---|
| Albania | President of Albania Ilir Meta convened the National Security Council and issued a statement to "strongly condemn Russia's military attack on Ukraine" as an "unprovoked and unjustifiable escalation" while expressing sorrow for lives lost and "full solidarity with the people of Ukraine, and its democratic institutions". Similar statements were made earlier by Prime Minister Edi Rama on Twitter, Minister for Europe and Foreign Affairs Olta Xhaçka, and Ambassador to the UN Ferit Hoxha at the Security Council meeting, joined the United States in calling for a UN vote on a resolution condemning Russian actions, with the intention of forcing Russia to veto. After a NATO summit, Rama said that Albania was ready to welcome a few thousand Ukrainian refugees fleeing the war. |
| Andorra | Prime Minister Xavier Espot appealed for peace, saying that "war should be no recourse". On 2 March, Andorra joined economic sanctions against Russia. Andorra had never previously applied sanctions towards another country. |
| Antigua and Barbuda | Minister of Foreign Affairs Paul Chet Greene condemned the Russian invasion and urged diplomatic talks. |
| Argentina | On 24 February, the Ministry of Foreign Affairs of Argentina called on Russia to respect the charter of the United Nations and international law. President Alberto Fernández asked "the Russian Federation to put an end to the military action, respect Ukraine's sovereignty and return to dialogue." On 24 February, Argentina, along with Brazil and three other Latin American states, abstained from a vote at the Organization of American States condemning the Russian invasion of Ukraine, saying the organization was not a "pertinent forum." On 2 March, Argentina voted in favor of the United Nations General Assembly Resolution ES-11/1 condemning Russia's invasion of Ukraine and demanding a full withdrawal of Russian forces. Before the UN, Foreign Minister Santiago Cafiero said that the invasion of Ukraine was "illegitimate" and condemned "military operations on Ukrainian soil," arguing further that the world "does not tolerate more deaths or wars." Argentina has also supported Ukraine at the UN Human Rights Council. On 1 July 2022, Fernández had a phone conversation with President Zelenskyy, where Fernández condemned the invasion again and promised more aid to Ukraine. After the change of government in December 2023, newly inaugurated president Javier Milei took a much harsher stance towards Russia. Milei met with Zelenskyy, and authorized the transfer of two military helicopters to Ukraine, promising more military aid. |
| Australia | Prime Minister Scott Morrison denounced the invasion and imposed export controls and travel bans on Russia, as a price for the "unprovoked, unlawful, unwarranted, unjustified attacks and threats and intimidation" and reaffirmed Australia's "unwavering commitment to Ukraine's sovereignty and territorial integrity". However, Morrison suggested that he did not expect Putin to be deterred. In response to Russia's claim of peacekeeping, Australia replied "They're not peacekeepers. They're invaders". On 25 February, Morrison condemned China's easing of import restrictions on Russian wheat as "inexplicable" and "completely unacceptable", and said it gave a "lifeline to Russia ... while they're invading another country". Minister for Communications Paul Fletcher called for a suspension on broadcasts of two Russian state-controlled TV networks, RT and NTV Moscow, on 25 February; two Australian TV services suspended broadcasts of RT, one of which also suspended broadcasts of NTV Moscow. |
| Austria | Chancellor of Austria Karl Nehammer said "There is war in Europe again", condemned Russia's attack and declared Austria's solidarity with Ukraine. |
| The Bahamas | The Bahamas denounced the invasion and Foreign Minister Fred Mitchell stated "The invasion of Ukraine by the Russian Federation and led by its President Vladimir Putin is wrong, unlawful and should end and be reversed." |
| Barbados | Prime Minister Mia Mottley urged Russia to withdraw and described the invasion as a violation of Ukrainian territorial integrity. |
| Belgium | Prime Minister Alexander De Croo said the EU needed "Russian sanctions that bite", especially against the "ruling elite". In early April, three Ukrainian families were to be placed in two of the Belgian royal family's properties, managed by the Royal Trust, while a third property would be used for "collective accommodation of Ukrainian refugees". |
| Belize | The Government of Belize condemned the 'illegal Russian invasion' and expressed its solidarity with Ukraine. Prince William, the grandson of the Queen of Belize, quoted her 1994 speech to the Belizean National Assembly, and said that people in Belize stood in solidarity with those struggling in Ukraine. |
| Bhutan | Bhutan voted for United Nations General Assembly Resolution ES-11/1, condemning the invasion. |
| Botswana | Botswana was one of 87 signatories to the UN letter condemning Russia's invasion of Ukraine. A year after the invasion of Ukraine, The Economist downgraded Botswana from "West leaning" to "Russia leaning". |
| Brunei | Brunei condemned the invasion, calling for the situation to be resolved without force. |
| Bulgaria | Bulgaria condemned the invasion and Prime Minister Kiril Petkov said: "We see that this aggression was not provoked by the Ukrainian side and such actions in Europe are inadmissible". Bulgarian Minister of Defence Stefan Yanev was sacked for insisting it was wrong to describe it as a war, saying it was an "operation." He also said there was no need for Bulgaria—a member of both the EU and NATO—to adopt a "pro-Russian, pro-American or pro-European position." |
| Cambodia | Prime Minister Hun Sen said that only through peaceful negotiation, and not war, could any disagreements be resolved. Hun Sen condemned the actions of Russia, saying "I still stand in solidarity with Ukrainian people against the invasion." It has been alleged that Cambodia's foreign ministry wanted to remain strictly neutral and abstain at UN votes, similar to Vietnam and Laos, in the days after Russia invaded Ukraine on 24 February last year but Hun Sen intervened and ordered his diplomat at the UN to co-sponsor a resolution condemning Moscow. |
| Canada | Prime Minister Justin Trudeau condemned "in the strongest possible terms Russia's egregious attack on Ukraine" and stated that "these unprovoked actions are a clear further violation of Ukraine's sovereignty and territorial integrity. They are also in violation of Russia's obligations under international law and the Charter of the United Nations." |
| Cape Verde | The Prime Minister of Cape Verde José Ulisses Correia e Silva condemned the invasion and called for a search for solutions through diplomatic channels and dialogue. |
| Chile | President Sebastián Piñera said that "Russia's act of aggression and violation of Ukraine's sovereignty" violated international law, while President -elect Gabriel Boric "condemn[ed] the invasion of Ukraine, the violation of its sovereignty and the illegitimate use of force". |
| Colombia | President Iván Duque stated that Colombia "categorically rejects the attacks against Ukraine by Russia" and considers the invasion a violation of international law and the United Nations charter. A year after the invasion of Ukraine, The Economist downgraded Colombia from "Condemns Russia" to "neutral". |
| Costa Rica | President Carlos Alvarado released a statement on Twitter rejecting and condemning the "use of force and the violation of the sovereignty and territorial integrity of Ukraine", saying that peace is the "only way". |
| Croatia | Prime Minister Andrej Plenković released a statement on Twitter saying: "We strongly condemn Russia's aggression and invasion on Ukraine. This unprovoked attack is a gross violation of Ukraine's sovereignty and international law". Plenković also met with the Ukrainian Ambassador to Croatia, noting that Croatia would support the EU sanctions package, and stood ready to provide humanitarian and technical assistance to Ukraine. |
| Cyprus | President Nicos Anastasiades tweeted his condemnation "in the strongest possible terms" adding "I must say that we witness with great disappointment what is happening in violation of international law and we cannot but condemn as a country similar actions that violate the sovereignty and territorial integrity of an independent country". Meanwhile, Foreign Minister Ioannis Kasoulidis called for a ceasefire and said that "these are military operations within Europe, something we have avoided since the end of WWII". |
| Czech Republic | President Miloš Zeman on 24 February called the invasion "an unprovoked act of aggression" and said that "Russia has committed a crime against peace", calling for harsh sanctions. He said he had been "wrong" to insist until a few days earlier that Russia would not invade Ukraine. Prime Minister Petr Fiala said his government had withdrawn its agreement to Russian consulates in Karlovy Vary and Brno, suspended the operation of the consulates of the Czech Republic in St. Petersburg and Yekaterinburg, and stopped issuing visas for Russian citizens. He also said that the republic would insist on the adoption of the strictest anti-Russian sanctions. |
| Denmark | Prime Minister Mette Frederiksen said that it was a "dark day for peace around the world", while stating that her government was ready to accept Ukrainian refugees. Faroe Islands – Prime Minister, Bárður á Steig Nielsen said: "It's a sad day and our thoughts are with the Ukrainian people. This is not only an attack on Ukraine but also on European peace. The Faroe Islands strongly condemn the Russian invasion of Ukraine. The attack is a clear violation of international law, which is meant to maintain justice, security and stability." Greenland – Greenland's Prime Minister, Múte B. Egede, condemned the invasion, called it meaningless, and announced that Greenland would join international sanctions against Russia. |
| Dominica | Dominica condemned the invasion and called for an end to the 'aggression'. |
| Dominican Republic | Dominican President Luis Abinader released a statement urging Russia to withdraw from Ukraine and furthermore stated that Russia was violating the political, cultural and territorial identity of Ukrainians. |
| Ecuador | President Guillermo Lasso said that Ecuador would support the position of the United Nations and the Organization of American States in condemning the invasion. "The aggression is a violent intrusion and a violation of our principles for worldwide peace," he said. He added, however, that Ecuador has no plans to suspend diplomatic relations with Russia. |
| Estonia | Prime Minister Kaja Kallas called Russia a "threat to the whole of Europe". Riigikogu, the parliament of Estonia, also passed two statements on the mobilization of Russia's pre-invasion forces and the start of the attack against Ukraine in 2022, in which it expressed support for the territorial integrity of Ukraine and condemned the war started by the Russian Federation. |
| Federated States of Micronesia | The Federated States of Micronesia severed diplomatic relations with Russia on 25 February 2022. "The FSM affirms its stalwart support of the North Atlantic Treaty Organization and the United Nations, who correctly condemn the Russian invasion of Ukraine. The FSM supports the removal of the Russian Federation in its capacity as president of the United Nations Security Council; Russia remaining there is a façade, as they need to be upholding the international rules-based order instead of undermining it." |
| Fiji | Acting Prime Minister Aiyaz Sayed-Khaiyum condemned Russia's actions in Ukraine, calling for an end to all hostilities and violation of international law and urging Russia to "return to the diplomatic table". |
| Finland | President Sauli Niinistö condemned Russia's attack and President Vladimir Putin, saying "the mask has now come off and only the cold face of war is visible". Prime Minister Sanna Marin said Russia's invasion of Ukraine would change the debate around NATO membership within her country, and wrote on Twitter that "The attack is a grave breach of international law and threatens the life of numerous civilians. Finland expresses its solid support to Ukraine and Ukrainians and we are looking for ways to increase this support". On 25 February 2022, a Russian foreign ministry spokesperson threatened "military and political consequences" if Finland attempted to join NATO. Niinistö and Marin issued a joint declaration on 12 May declaring that Finland should join NATO. |
| France | President of France Emmanuel Macron said he had spoken with Putin "to stop the fighting and talk to the Ukrainian president" and demanded "an immediate halt to Russian military operations in Ukraine". |
| Gabon | Gabon participated in the Albanian-American-led Joint Statement following a vote on a UN Security Council resolution on Russia's aggression toward Ukraine. A year after the invasion of Ukraine, The Economist downgraded Gabon from "West leaning" to "neutral". |
| The Gambia | The Gambia cosponsored the Albanian-American-led statement at the UN Security Council condemning Russia. |
| Georgia | President Salome Zourabichvili stated that "We are participating in all kinds of international financial sanctions and that's quite something for the Georgian financial sector. At the same time, we are participating in all the international resolutions that have been taken to support Ukraine. We share [with Ukraine] a common two-century history of Russian aggression and we know what that means" Zourabichvili said that her nation was "shocked" by Russian aggression in Ukraine. She affirmed her "solidarity with the Ukrainian people" and called for a halt in military operations. The Georgian government contributed 1 million GEL from its reserve budget to help Ukrainians harmed by Russia's military assault. Prime Minister Irakli Garibashvili made the decision and signed the decree authorizing the aid. The funding will be used to purchase medical supplies for Georgia's Ministry of Internally Displaced Persons, Labor, Health, and Social Affairs. On 24 February, the Chairman of the Parliament of Georgia Shalva Papuashvili expressed his solidarity with Ukraine and called on the international community to take steps to "stop Russia escalating into a full-scale conflict and ensure the protection of international norms." On 27 February 100 tons of humanitarian aid were delivered to Ukraine via Poland, including first-aid supplies, over 30 types of pharmaceuticals, oxygen concentrators, and other humanitarian supplies. In addition, Georgia provided blood components, transfusion materials, and diagnostics. On 4 March, the Georgian Health Ministry declared that all Ukrainian citizens in Georgia would receive free emergency medical services if needed. Prime Minister Irakli Garibashvili said that Georgia's government could not impose separate sanctions against Russia. Vice Prime Minister/Minister of Foreign Affairs of Georgia, David Zalkaliani stated that "Military aggression launched by Russia against Ukraine is totally intolerable". He called on international partners to give a strict response to the violation of international law by Russia and ensure the de-escalation of the situation. The Ministry of Foreign Affairs of Georgia expressed extreme concern about developments in Ukraine. According to its statement, Russia's military actions undermined Ukraine's territorial integrity and sovereignty as well as the UN Charter and fundamental principles of international law. Economy Minister Levan Davitashvili said that Georgia was part of every international sanction against Russia A Parliamentary delegation of Georgia visited two Ukrainian cities where Papuashvili strongly opposed Russia's invasion of Ukraine. The opposition United National Movement (UNM), Georgia's main opposition party, paid a surprise visit to Kyiv on the same day, sending a separate delegation that included party chairman Nika Melia and former Georgian President Giorgi Margvelashvili. |
| Germany | Annalena Baerbock, minister of foreign affairs, said that the world woke up in a different world. She announced massive sanctions against Russia. Chancellor Olaf Scholz called the invasion a "serious mistake" of Putin's. Germany initially ruled out sending weapons to Ukraine and prevented Estonia from sending German-made howitzers to Ukraine. Germany said it was sending 5,000 helmets and a field hospital to Ukraine, to which Kyiv mayor Vitali Klitschko responded, "What will they send next? Pillows?" On 26 February, in what was seen by observers as a reaction to mounting pressure from allies in NATO and EU, Germany reversed itself and allowed Estonia to send nine German-made howitzers and the Netherlands to send 400 rocket-propelled grenade launchers, and additionally agreed to send 1,000 anti-tank weapons and 500 Stinger anti-aircraft defence systems to Ukraine. At an emergency parliamentary session on 27 February, Scholz spoke of a "new era" that had begun with the Russian invasion. Germany would from then on invest more than the NATO target of two percent of the gross domestic product in defence. 100 billion euros would be made available for investments in the army in 2022. According to Bild, German President Frank-Walter Steinmeier planned to travel to Kyiv in April 2022 as a signal of solidarity but was snubbed by Ukrainian officials. |
| Ghana | Foreign Minister Shirley Ayorkor Botchway condemned the invasion. |
| Greece | President Katerina Sakellaropoulou said that "we strongly condemn the Russian attack on an independent country" as "a clear violation of international law and our values". On 8 March 2022, International Women's Day, Sakellaropoulou appeared at the Hellenic Parliament with a dress in the colors of Ukraine's flag, in tribute to the Ukrainian women affected by the war. Prime Minister Kyriakos Mitsotakis condemned the "revisionist" actions of Russia against Ukraine. |
| Grenada | Grenada condemned the invasion. |
| Guatemala | President Alejandro Giammattei released a statement on Twitter, condemning the Russian invasion. |
| Guyana | Guyana condemned the invasion and urged Russia to respect Ukrainian sovereignty. |
| Haiti | Haiti expressed concerns at the situation in Ukraine and urged the two countries to find a diplomatic solution. Haiti cosponsored a UN Security Council resolution condemning Russia. |
| Iceland | Prime Minister Katrín Jakobsdóttir condemned Russia's invasion of Ukraine as "an unacceptable breach of international law." |
| Indonesia | Ministry of Foreign Affairs spokesman Teuku Faizasyah expressed concern about the conflict. Indonesia urged Russia to respect the sovereignty and territorial integrity of Ukraine. A ministry press release said that the attack on Ukraine was "unacceptable". Indonesian President Joko Widodo also tweeted "Stop war. War brings suffering to mankind and endangers the world." (Note: Indonesian: "Setop perang. Perang itu menyengsarakan umat manusia, dan membahayakan dunia.") The People's Representative Council also issued a condemnation statement. |
| Italy | Prime Minister Mario Draghi promised "whatever it takes to restore Ukrainian sovereignty" and said it was "impossible to have meaningful dialogue with Moscow", demanding Russia unconditionally pull its forces back to the internationally established borders. |
| Republic of Ireland | President Michael D. Higgins called the Russian invasion "unacceptable and immoral" and stated: "This violence must stop. Troops must be withdrawn by Russia. The rise of militarism must end. Full humanitarian access must be given to all civilians in need. Every glimmer of hope through diplomacy must be seized." Taoiseach Micheál Martin condemned the "outrageous" actions of Russia in Ukraine and promised "severe sanctions from EU", while saying: "Our thoughts must be with the innocent people of Ukraine at this, their most difficult hour." Tánaiste Leo Varadkar stated that whilst Ireland is militarily neutral, "in this conflict, Ireland is not neutral at all", acknowledging the country's "unwavering and unconditional" support for Ukraine. He compared the invasion of Ukraine to the invasion of Czechoslovakia in 1939, calling Putin "the Hitler of the 21st century". |
| Jamaica | Prime Minister Andrew Holness condemned Russia, stating "Jamaica is consistent in its support for the universal respect and adherence to the principles of international law, the respect for the territorial integrity and sovereignty of all nations. We, therefore, cannot support, and, in fact, we condemn the invasion of Ukraine". |
| Japan | Prime Minister Fumio Kishida condemned the invasion and announced that it would cooperate with the United States on further sanctions against Russia. On 25 February, Japan implemented new sanctions, including an export ban on semiconductors and other high-tech products, and froze the assets of three Russian banks, but later stated that it would not confiscate the frozen Russian foreign reserves parked with the Bank of Japan. It also considered extending sanctions to Belarus, because of its support for the invasion. On 26 February, Japan agreed to increase deterrence efforts with the U.S., with Japanese Foreign Minister Yoshimasa Hayashi stating that the "impact of this will not stop in Europe." Japan–Russia relations had previously been characterized by Japanese attempts to avoid antagonizing Russia, particularly in that the Kuril Islands dispute was Russia's only territorial dispute in Asia. However, Japan was increasingly concerned about the geopolitical implications of the annexation on China and Taiwan. |
| Kenya | Kenya participated in the Albanian-American-led Joint Statement following a vote on a UN Security Council resolution on Russia's aggression toward Ukraine. |
| Kiribati | Kiribati cosponsored a UN Security Council resolution condemning Russia. |
| Kuwait | Kuwait participated in the US-led joint statement following a vote on a UN Security Council resolution on Russia's aggression. |
| Latvia | President of Latvia Egils Levits strongly condemned the Russian invasion of Ukraine, calling for "all possible support, including weapons" to Ukraine and "the harshest possible sanctions" against Russia. In a later interview he called the invasion the "beginning of the end for Putin". On 26 February, the Ministry of Foreign Affairs of Latvia suspended issuing visas to Russian nationals with the exception of humanitarian visas. Two days later, Saeima approved legal amendments allowing Latvian nationals to voluntarily fight on the Ukrainian side against the Russian invasion. On 4 March, Riga City Council renamed a section of the street in front of the Russian Embassy to Ukrainian Independence Street. Prime Minister of Latvia Krišjānis Kariņš expressed that the Latvian economy and exports should continue to transition away from Russia, and the dependence on Russian energy imports should be reduced as soon as possible. |
| Lebanon | The Lebanese Foreign Ministry on 24 February condemned Russia's invasion, and called on Moscow to "immediately halt military operations." Russia's embassy in Lebanon expressed surprise at this condemnation, releasing a statement that "The statement... surprised us [the Russian embassy] by violating the policy of dissociation and by taking one side against another in these events, noting that Russia spared no effort in contributing to the advancement and stability of the Lebanese Republic". A year after the invasion of Ukraine, The Economist downgraded Lebanon from "West leaning" to "neutral". |
| Lesotho | Lesotho participated in the Albanian-American-led Joint Statement following a vote on a UN Security Council resolution on Russia's aggression toward Ukraine. |
| Liberia | The Liberian government said that the unprovoked attack was unacceptable, and "[urged] Russia to ease hostilities". |
| Libya | Foreign Minister Najla Mangoush condemned Russia's military intervention as a violation of international law, and called on Moscow "to calm and retreat." A year after the invasion of Ukraine, The Economist downgraded Libya from "West leaning" to "neutral". |
| Liechtenstein | Liechtenstein condemned the invasion in a statement published on the government's official website. The government of Liechtenstein promised CHF 500,000 from its existing International Humanitarian Cooperation and Development Budget to humanitarian projects for those affected by the war. |
| Lithuania | Lithuania strongly condemned the invasion and called for military, economic and humanitarian aid for Ukraine. President of Lithuania Gitanas Nauseda declared a state of emergency, ordering the NATO country's armed forces to deploy along its borders in response to "possible disturbances and provocations due to large military forces massed in Russia and Belarus". |
| Luxembourg | Prime Minister Xavier Bettel condemned the invasion on Twitter. Foreign minister Jean Asselborn, in an interview with local radio, said the "physical elimination" of Putin was potentially the only way out of the war. He later described his remarks as a "slip of the tongue" and an emotional reaction to having just heard of Russia's indiscriminate attacks on Kharkiv. |
| Malawi | President Lazarus Chakwera urged Russia to withdraw. |
| Malaysia | Prime Minister Ismail Sabri expressed concern over the "escalation of conflict in Ukraine". He called for dialogue and "peace and security". Independent news portal Malaysiakini noted that the statement lacked forceful language and did not mention Russia or call the conflict as an "invasion", prompting a response accusing the news portal of diverting from "the gist of the press statement". On 27 February, the Malaysian Foreign Ministry denied a report by the South China Morning Post that it had "bungled" the evacuation of Malaysian nationals from Ukraine by forcing them to travel to Poland in private vehicles to escape the Russian invasion, after reports that the chartered bus scheduled to pick them up failed to arrive. This was followed by allegations that the Malaysian government had dismissed the possibility of a Russian invasion as a "Western narrative". At the UN emergency session, Malaysia's representative announced it would vote in favor of the draft resolution condemning the invasion. |
| Maldives | Maldives voted for United Nations General Assembly Resolution ES-11/1, condemning the invasion. |
| Malta | Prime Minister Robert Abela said that during the meeting of European leaders Malta had "spoken in favour of peace in Ukraine", adding that doing so "did not compromise Malta's position of neutrality", as Malta's constitution affirms the island as a neutral state adhering to a policy of non-alignment. |
| Marshall Islands | Marshall Islands cosponsored a UN Security Council resolution condemning Russia. |
| Mauritius | The Mauritian government called for a peaceful resolution of the conflict and joined the call to return to peaceful dialogue between the parties. |
| Mexico | The Secretary of Foreign Affairs of Mexico Marcelo Ebrard, on behalf of President Andrés Manuel López Obrador, issued a statement on Twitter, rejecting and condemning the Russian invasion. He demanded a cessation of hostilities to achieve a peaceful resolution. On 1 March, however, López Obrador announced that Mexico would not participate in economic sanctions against Russia and criticised the overseas censorship of Russian state media. At the 2022 G20 Bali summit, López Obrador reaffirmed that Mexico would, officially, remain neutral on the conflict. |
| Moldova | President Maia Sandu condemned the act of war, calling it "a blatant breach of international law and of Ukrainian sovereignty and territorial integrity." She added that Moldova was ready to accept tens of thousands of people fleeing Ukraine after the Russian attack and vowed to keep the borders open to help. |
| Monaco | Prince Albert II affirmed his support for Ukraine in a statement: "The Principality reaffirms its support of international laws, and to the sovereignty, the integrity and the independence of states." and "Monaco is at the side of the Ukrainian population and human rights." Minister of State Pierre Dartout announced his concern and said that Monaco was on the side of the Ukrainian people. He urged the Russians to cease their military operation immediately and for dialogue to resume. The Monaco Royal Palace said in a statement "The Principality has adopted and implemented, without delay, procedures for freezing funds and economic sanctions identical to those taken by most European States." |
| Montenegro | President Milo Đukanović condemned the Russian invasion, saying it "violates all fundamental principles of international law, undermines European security, and endangers its stability." Deputy Prime Minister Dritan Abazović also tweeted that Montenegro stands with NATO and EU partners. |
| Nepal | Nepal opposed the invasion and said principles of sovereignty and territorial integrity must be fully respected. |
| New Zealand | Prime Minister Jacinda Ardern condemned Russia's invasion of Ukraine and called for Russia to immediately withdraw from Ukraine in a bid to avoid a "catastrophic and pointless" loss of life. New Zealand has suspended high-level diplomatic engagements with Russia and introduced travel bans and export controls. In early March 2022, the New Zealand Parliament passed legislation imposing sanctions on Russian elites, organisations and assets deemed complicit in the invasion. In late March, the New Zealand Defence Force dispatched nine intelligence analysts to assist British and Belgian intelligence gathering work relating to the war in Ukraine. In mid-April 2022, New Zealand dispatched a C-130 Hercules aircraft and 58 military personnel to assist with logistics and transportation. Cook Islands – In a statement, the Cook Islands Ministry of Foreign Affairs and Immigration said: "The Cook Islands join with others in condemning Russia's unprovoked invasion of the Ukraine. We call on Russia to end the hostilities and violations of the international rule of law." |
| Netherlands | Prime Minister Mark Rutte condemned Russia's actions in the "strongest possible terms", saying that "one country and one man are responsible", while calling for "maximum sanctions" against Russia. King Willem-Alexander and Queen Máxima stated that their "hearts go out to the people of Ukraine and everyone affected by the violence." The Dutch royal family announced it would host six to eight families of refugees from Ukraine from mid-April at Het Oude Loo. |
| Nigeria | On 24 February 2022, the Nigerian Ministry of Foreign Affairs describing the invasion as a "surprise". It announced plans for the evacuation of Nigerian citizens from Ukraine. However, it avoided condemning the actions of Russia, and reaffirmed Russia's claims that the attacks in Ukraine had "been confined to military installations". On 26 February 2022, after Foreign Minister Geoffrey Onyeama met with Ukrainian Ambassador to Nigeria Kirdoda Valerii, Russian ambassador to Nigeria Alexey Shebarshin, and envoys from the G7 countries, he officially condemned Russia's invasion and urged Russian troops be withdrawn. |
| North Macedonia | President Stevo Pendarovski condemned the Russian invasion as "an attack on the territorial integrity and sovereignty of Ukraine, blatant violation of the basic principles of international law, attack on the democratic order and a threat to the stability of Europe." Prime Minister Dimitar Kovačevski announced his government's readiness to receive refugees from Ukraine if the situation there deteriorated further. |
| Norway | Prime Minister Jonas Gahr Støre assured that Norway "condemns Russia's military attack on Ukraine in the strongest possible terms". |
| Palau | Palau participated in the Albanian-American-led Joint Statement following a vote on a UN Security Council resolution on Russia's aggression toward Ukraine. |
| Paraguay | Paraguay condemned the invasion. |
| Papua New Guinea | Papua New Guinea cosponsored a UN Security Council resolution condemning Russia. |
| Panama | Panama lamented the invasion and stated their support for Ukrainian sovereignty, independence and territorial integrity. |
| Peru | Foreign Affairs Minister César Landa said in a statement: "Faced with the violation of [the] sovereignty, territory, and integrity of Ukraine, Peru rejects the use of force and states its opinion through the Foreign Affairs Ministry, invoking respect for international law." |
| Philippines | The Philippines Department of Foreign Affairs urged the international community to reaffirm its commitment to peaceful dialogue and "more than words" and cited the UN General Assembly's Manila Declaration on the Peaceful Settlement of International Disputes. Foreign Secretary Teodoro Locsin Jr. committed to going to the Ukrainian border to personally oversee the repatriation of Filipinos in Ukraine. The Philippines later said it would vote to condemn the invasion at the emergency special session of the United Nations General Assembly. President Rodrigo Duterte appealed to Putin, who is also his personal friend, on 23 May to rein in Russian armed forces following reports of civilians deaths, and to assure safety for those fleeing the area. He acknowledged the conflict was a war against a sovereign nation rather than a "special military operation". |
| Poland | Prime Minister Mateusz Morawiecki wrote on Twitter that "We must immediately respond to Russia's criminal aggression on Ukraine Europe and the free world has to stop Putin", and its government announced that the country was "ready to accept migrants and has prepared hospitals and a train to transport Ukrainians wounded in the assault". The National Broadcasting Council banned the Russian state-controlled television network RT on 24 February. |
| Portugal | Prime Minister António Costa "vehemently condemns the military action triggered by Russia today on Ukrainian soil" in a press statement following a meeting with the minister of state and foreign affairs, the minister of defence, and the chief of the general staff. |
| Romania | President Klaus Iohannis condemned Russia's military aggression against Ukraine via Twitter. He said that "Romania, together with the entire international democratic community, strongly rejects this irresponsible behaviour that undermines the foundations of international relations and the current order of international law", and that "the Russian Federation has once again shown that it is not is interested in the constructive and responsible dialogue offered by the European and Euro-Atlantic community" and that Romanian citizens should leave Ukraine as soon as possible. |
| San Marino | The San Marino Secretary for Foreign Affairs issued a statement saying that "the military escalation in Ukraine is a great wound for all the people and nations who strongly believe in the values of peace and strongly condemn war" and "the San Marino institutions and government are in deep shock at this time". |
| Saint Lucia | Saint Lucia expressed concern about the invasion and supported the CARICOM statement condemning Russia. |
| Samoa | Samoa's permanent representative to the United Nations, Fatumanava-o-Upolu III Pa'olelei Luteru, described the invasion as "unprovoked" and stated that "Samoa is greatly concerned by the invasion of Ukraine by the Russian Federation. Such action is a clear violation of the territorial integrity and sovereignty." He also called for Russia and Ukraine to engage in peace negotiations. |
| Sierra Leone | President Julius Maada Bio urged an end to the war in Ukraine "for the sake of humanity", stating that he believes "even those who sympathise with Russia are in favour of stopping this war". Amid his 2023 candidacy for reelection, Bio indicated that he hopes diplomacy led by African leaders can help broker an end to the war. |
| Singapore | Singapore's Ministry of Foreign Affairs said Singapore "strongly condemns any unprovoked invasion of a sovereign country under any pretext," and that "the sovereignty, independence and territorial integrity of Ukraine must be respected." "All parties concerned should continue to pursue dialogue, including diplomatic means, towards a peaceful settlement of the dispute, in accordance with international law, and avoid activities that will further raise tensions in the region." Local news outlets reported that Singapore might join international sanctions on Russia, and was unlikely to take a direct economic hit from export curbs on Russia. On 28 February 2022, Singapore announced sanctions against Russia, export controls on items "that can be used directly as weapons in Ukraine to inflict harm or to subjugate the Ukrainians" and moved to "block certain Russian banks and financial transactions connected to Russia". The move was a first by a Southeast Asian country and a departure from the Association of Southeast Asian Nations' refusal to condemn the invasion. |
| Slovakia | Prime Minister Eduard Heger stated that "The Russian imperialism has been restored in front of our eyes in its aggressive, militant form" and about Russian president Vladimir Putin added "All victims of this war will be his victims and he will be responsible for them in the eyes of the global public." On 24 February 2022, Bratislava Castle and the seat of President of Slovakia Grassalkovich Palace in Bratislava was light up in blue and yellow in solidarity with Ukraine. Slovakia also provided Ukraine with an S-300 air defense system. |
| Slovenia | Prime Minister Janez Janša condemned Russia's "unprecedented military aggression against Ukraine" and demanded that Russia immediately withdraw its military and fully respect Ukraine's territorial integrity, reaffirming Slovenia's support of Ukraine. The national flag of Ukraine was hung from the Slovenian Parliament in Ljubljana as a symbol of solidarity and brotherhood between the two countries. |
| South Korea | President Moon Jae-in said that South Korea would join sanctions against Russia. He said: "The use of armed forces causing human casualties cannot be justified under any circumstances". The Ministry of Foreign Affairs said: "The Korean government strongly condemns Russia's armed invasion against Ukraine as a violation of the principles of the UN Charter" and "the Korean government will support and join the international community's efforts, including economic sanctions, to curb armed invasion". On 1 March, South Korea announced it would stop all transactions with seven main Russian banks and their affiliates, and restrict the purchase of Russian treasury bonds. In April 2022, South Korea turned down Ukraine's request for ground-based systems targeting aircraft and ballistic missiles, citing its "principled stance" of not providing lethal hardware. At the time, Ukraine had already been provided with approximately 25,000 anti-air and 60,000 anti-tank systems by the U.S. and its allies. |
| Spain | Prime Minister Pedro Sánchez condemned the "intolerable military actions of the Russian government in Ukrainian soil" on Twitter after holding a meeting of the Spanish National Security Council presided over by King Felipe VI. Minister of Foreign Affairs José Manuel Albares called the attack "unjustifiable" and a "blatant violation of international law", and announced that Spain was coordinating with EU partners and NATO allies. Minister of Defence Margarita Robles asked for "really severe" sanctions and called Russian actions "of an extraordinary gravity" but noted that there would be no NATO troops on Ukrainian soil as the country "is not a NATO member". On 27 February, Spanish Defence Minister Margarita Robles announced the shipment of 20 tons of defense military equipment to Ukraine and advanced the request to send the frigate Blas de Lezo in conjunction with a NATO mission. |
| Suriname | Suriname condemned the invasion. |
| Sweden | Prime Minister Magdalena Andersson stated that "Sweden condemns in the strongest terms Russia's ongoing invasion of Ukraine. Russia's acts are also an attack on the European security order. It will be met by a united and robust response in solidarity with Ukraine. Russia alone is responsible for human suffering." Andersson announced that Sweden would apply for NATO membership on 16 May, in coordination with neighboring Finland's application. |
| Switzerland | The Swiss foreign ministry called Russia's actions an "invasion" and a "gross violation of international law", while Swiss President Ignazio Cassis announced that the country would support EU sanctions on travel and finance but would still not impose sanctions of its own. However, the Swiss Federal Council reversed course on 28 February, announcing that Switzerland was imposing the same sanctions on Russian assets as the European Union. Exempt from these sanctions were payments for energy raw materials. According to Cassis, the decision was unprecedented but consistent with Swiss neutrality. The Ukraine Recovery International Conference took place in Lugano, Switzerland on 5 July 2022, to finance the rebuilding of the war-torn nation. |
| Thailand | Thailand's Ministry of Foreign Affairs expressed "deep concern" and said that it supported "peaceful settlement to the situation through dialogue." |
| Timor-Leste | Timor-Leste was one of 87 signatories to the UN letter condemning Russia's invasion of Ukraine. |
| Trinidad and Tobago | Foreign Minister Amery Browne condemned the invasion. |
| Tunisia | Tunisia called on all parties to work on settling the conflict through peaceful means, expressed "great concern" over the aggravation of tension in the region." Tunisia called on its nationals in Ukraine not to leave the country without prior coordination. |
| United Kingdom | The Queen made a "generous" donation to the Disasters Emergency Committee (DEC) Ukraine Humanitarian Appeal. Prime Minister Boris Johnson said that he was "appalled by the horrific events in Ukraine" and "President Putin has chosen a path of bloodshed and destruction by launching this unprovoked attack". During a visit to Southend-on-Sea, the Prince of Wales condemned the Russian invasion, stating: "What we saw in the terrible tragedy in Southend was an attack on democracy, on an open society, on freedom itself. We are seeing those same values under attack today in Ukraine in the most unconscionable way. In the stand we take here, we are in solidarity with all those who are resisting brutal aggression." His wife, the Duchess of Cornwall, made a "substantial" donation to the Daily Mail's refugee campaign. The royal household of the Duke and Duchess of Cambridge stated on Twitter: "In October 2020 we had the privilege to meet President Zelenskyy and the First Lady to learn of their hope and optimism for Ukraine's future. Today we stand with the President and all of Ukraine's people as they bravely fight for that future." The couple also made a private donation and were thanked by President Zelenskyy for their message of support. Secretary of State for Defence Ben Wallace described Russia's actions as "naked aggression against a democratic country". Gibraltar – "Today's actions by Russia, launching a full-scale invasion of a sovereign, democratic nation without any provocation or reasonable excuse, is nothing short of appalling. None of us expected to witness such unforgivable aggression in Europe in our lifetimes. Gibraltar therefore joins with the Prime Minister of the United Kingdom, leaders of other nations and people around the world in condemning this action in the most strident terms", said Chief Minister Fabian Picardo. Picardo called for a ban of the Russian state-controlled television network RT on 25 February; television providers in Gibraltar agreed to suspend broadcasts of RT. Guernsey – "Guernsey follows the UK's sanctions regime and UK foreign policy and will continue to do so. Some of the announced measures will apply automatically and this has already been communicated to the industry. Some of the other sanctions announced yesterday may require new legislation in the UK and if so, the States will move in step with the UK to ensure that all new sanctions will apply and be enforced uniformly." Isle of Man – The Isle of Man government is in close contact with the UK government and will remain so regarding the unfolding situation in Ukraine. "We will take action in line with the UK government." It since closed its airspace and ports to Russian airplanes and ships, and extended the UK's sanctions to automatically apply on the Isle of Man. The chief minister Alfred Cannan condemned the actions of the Russian President. Jersey – The Deputy (Acting) Chief Minister, Senator Lyndon Farnham, issued the following statement: "We are fully alongside the United Kingdom in its condemnation of this aggressive action, and we will act promptly in line with the UK's response. The UK is ultimately responsible for our foreign relations as a matter of international law, and we implement both U.K. and UN sanctions. |
| United States | President Joe Biden released a statement condemning the Russian invasion as "unprovoked and unjustified" and accused Putin of starting a "premeditated war that will bring a catastrophic loss of life and human suffering". Biden stated the US would not dispatch its own forces to protect Ukraine, however, Biden did authorize sanctions directly targeting Putin and Russian Foreign Minister Sergey Lavrov. In the 2022 State of the Union Address, Biden announced that all US airspace would be closed to all Russian aircraft. Biden additionally condemned Russian oligarchs who supported Putin, stating that "We are joining with our European allies to find and seize your yachts, your luxury apartments, your private jets. We are coming for your ill-begotten gains." Vice President Kamala Harris threatened to increase sanctions against Russia at the Munich Security Conference: "Let me be clear, I can say with absolute certainty: If Russia further invades Ukraine, the United States, together with our allies and partners, will impose significant and unprecedented economic costs." House speaker Nancy Pelosi vowed the House would pass as much funding as needed to support the Ukrainian government. Senate Majority Leader Chuck Schumer said that "there's a Holocaust going on" in Ukraine. |
| Uruguay | President Luis Lacalle Pou condemned Russia's "actions contrary to international law", and declared that Uruguay "is a country that is always committed to peace", for which he encouraged the return of negotiations for a "civilised resolution" of the conflict. In an official statement from the Ministry of Foreign Relations, the government stated that the principles of the Charter of the United Nations were "notoriously violated" after the Russian military attacks; and announced that four Uruguayan citizens were evacuated from Ukraine to Cyprus, and that it was monitoring the situation, attending to the situation of its "compatriots" in order to provide them with the proper assistance. |

==== Governments in exile ====
| State | Notes |
|---|---|
| Afghanistan | Chargé d'Affaires of Afghanistan's Permanent Mission to the United Nations Naseer Ahmad Faiq, who represents the country's internationally recognized former government, the Islamic Republic of Afghanistan, voted for United Nations General Assembly Resolution ES-11/1, condemning the invasion. |
| Myanmar | The Minister of International Cooperation of the exiled National Unity Government of Myanmar, Dr. Sasa, said "The unprovoked, unjustified attacks on Ukraine by Russia are inexcusable and unacceptable." |

==== Non UN members ====
| State | Notes |
|---|---|
| Kosovo | Prime Minister Albin Kurti condemned the Russian invasion as "the largest military aggression, not only in Europe, since the end of the Second World War", stating "we stand in solidarity with the people of Ukraine and stand together with the EU, NATO, the US, and the UK for state sovereignty, territorial integrity, the country's independence and the right of self-determination for the people of Ukraine", alongside condemnations by the Kosovar parliament. Meanwhile, President Vjosa Osmani said that the people of Kosovo supported Ukrainians "as they face an unprovoked war as a result of Russian aggression", stating on Twitter that "we will work with our allies. ... Russian hegemony will not triumph. Freedom and democracy will win". A joint statement by Kosovo's president, prime minister and senior ministers furthermore condemned attempts to draw parallels to Kosovo's own declaration of independence from Serbia: "Dictator Putin's effort to refer to the Kosovo case and draw parallel are totally unstable, abusive and an attempt to camouflage the lack of any base or reason for the barbarous attack of its forces against a sovereign state." |
| Northern Cyprus (Note: Northern Cyprus is a disputed state recognized by only one UN member, Turkey. It is internationally considered to be part of the Republic of Cyprus.) | The Ministry of Foreign Affairs strongly recommended all Turkish Cypriots in Ukraine to take all possible safety measures as well as services for those looking to leave Ukraine. |
| Taiwan (Note: For the status of Taiwan, see: De facto and de jure states, Political status of Taiwan, List of sovereign states#Taiwan, One China, Two Chinas and List of states with limited recognition) | President Tsai Ing-wen stated "our government condemns Russia's violation of Ukraine's sovereignty and urges all parties to continue to resolve the disputes through peaceful and rational means." The Ministry of Foreign Affairs announced that Taiwan would join international sanctions against Russia and expressed regret over Russia's decision to "use force and intimidation in bullying others instead of resolving disputes through peaceful diplomatic negotiations." Taiwan moved to block Russian banks from the SWIFT system and sent 27 tonnes of military aid. Later, President Tsai Ing-wen, Vice President William Lai and Premier Su Tseng-chang announced they would each donate one month of salary towards humanitarian aid for Ukraine. |

=== Leans to Ukraine ===
While these countries have taken some neutral positions, in general they have been described as being supportive of Ukraine.

| State | Notes |
|---|---|
| Bangladesh | Foreign Minister AK Abdul Momen called for the conflict to be peacefully resolved in line with the Charter of the United Nations. Prime Minister Sheikh Hasina asked all concerned persons to observe the Russia-Ukraine war situation. Russia is building a megaproject in Bangladesh, the Rooppur Nuclear Power Plant. Russia provides all the funding and logistics for this project, but experts suspect that the war could disrupt the work. Even though 77% of the construction work is already done, the war situation could prolong the rest of the construction. The Soviet Union, of which Russia and Ukraine were both part, helped Bangladesh gain independence from Pakistan in the 1971 Bangladesh Liberation War, by providing extensive military and diplomatic assistance. The neutral stance the country took in the invasion was believed to be related to concerns that Bangladesh itself did not want to be threatened by larger nuclear armed neighbours. A year after the invasion of Ukraine, The Economist changed Bangladesh from "Neutral" to "West leaning". In 2023, Bangladesh for the first time condemned Russia and stated it's 'violation of international law'. |
| Brazil | Putin with Brazilian President Luiz Inácio Lula da Silva in Moscow, Russia, 9 May 2025 President Jair Bolsonaro declined to condemn the Russian invasion of Ukraine, while departing from his government's official stance at the United Nations to say Brazil would remain neutral. Brazil supported a resolution condemning Russia's invasion of Ukraine at a United Nations Security Council meeting on 25 February. Vice-president Hamilton Mourão suggested use of force against Russia in the context of military crisis. However, on 27 February, President Jair Bolsonaro said that he would not condemn the invasion and that Brazil would remain neutral. In 2023, Brazilian President Luiz Inácio Lula da Silva condemned the invasion, but suggested Ukraine could "give up Crimea" in exchange for peace and Russia's withdrawal from the Ukrainian territory it occupied after February 2022, which Ukraine rejected. |
| Bosnia and Herzegovina | Croat and Bosniak members of the tripartite presidency, Željko Komšić and Šefik Džaferović, issued separate statements condemning the Russian invasion, with Komšić saying that Bosnia would support Ukraine. The Serb member Milorad Dodik did not, instead stating that Bosnia and Herzegovina was neutral. He'd said the previous day that events showed it was good Bosnia and Herzegovina had not joined NATO, and that the country would not support sanctions. Foreign Minister Bisera Turković said: "Bosnia and Herzegovina remains firmly committed to Ukraine's sovereignty and territorial integrity, and we call for an immediate end to fighting and shelling! OSCE principles, security and international law are under attack today. Hostility and suffering of innocent civilians must end immediately". Turković called on Russia and Belarus to refrain from using force in the interests of peace, and regional and global stability. |
| Hungary | President János Áder said "Hungary was also forced to endure a similar (invasion) in 1956". Áder added that "we [Hungary] have done everything we could to urge the leadership in Moscow to remain level-headed and exercise restraint. Unfortunately, we could not succeed because, as it has now become clear, Russia was carrying out a premeditated plan which was followed by the conscious deception of its international partners". Prime Minister Viktor Orbán stated that "together with our EU and NATO allies, we condemn Russia's military attack", adding that sending either troops or military equipment to Ukraine was "out of the question, though we will, of course, provide humanitarian aid". A year after the invasion of Ukraine, The Economist downgraded Hungary from "Condemns Russia" to "West leaning". |
| Israel | Israeli Prime Minister Naftali Bennett called for a halt to the violence and pledged humanitarian aid to Ukraine, also offering to mediate and broker a ceasefire between Russia and Ukraine. Foreign Affairs Minister and Alternate Prime Minister Yair Lapid called the attack "a grave violation of the international order. Israel condemns the attack, and is ready and prepared to provide humanitarian assistance to the citizens of Ukraine. Israel is a country that has experienced wars, and war is not the way to resolve conflicts." On 27 February 2022, Israeli Interior Minister Ayelet Shaked declared a two-month visa extension for all Ukrainian tourists in Israel, so they could receive temporary asylum from the war in Ukraine. On 8 March 2022, Shaked announced an official policy of hosting Israel's Ukrainian refugees who were not eligible for aliyah. All 16,000 Ukrainians in Israel before the invasion who were not citizens would receive an automatic three-month extension of their residence visa in Israel. If the war continued beyond that, they would be able to stay in Israel automatically and even receive work permits and the right to Israeli medical insurance. An Israeli pension for non-Israeli Ukrainian adults who would not be able to work in the future was also being considered. It also decided to cancel the economic guarantee requirement for Israeli citizens who hosted Ukrainians in their homes, and opened an additional quota of 5,000 Ukrainian refugees. Any Ukrainian would be able to submit an online application on the Foreign Ministry website and until the quota was filled, in the absence of other issues, would be able to come to Israel temporarily. Israeli citizens would be able to apply to invite Ukrainian citizens, up to one nuclear family per applicant, and these would receive as much priority as possible. In total, Israel planned to host 25,000 refugees for the duration of the war. On 13 March, Shaked announced that anyone with a relative in Israel would be exempt from the quota and still would receive legal refugee status. On 3 July 2022, the Israeli Supreme Court abolished the quotas on Ukrainian refugees and allowed unlimited entry of refugees into Israel. The President of Ukraine welcomed the decision as a sign of "a true, developed democracy". Despite voting to condemn Russia's invasion of Ukraine, Israel has offered to be a mediator in the crisis. |
| Jordan | The Minister of Foreign Affairs of Jordan urged the international community and the parties to spare no effort to promote restraint and de-escalation, and called for peaceful settlement of the conflict through dialogue to restore security and stability in the region. Jordan has been classified as a "West leaning" state on the Russia-Ukraine crisis according to The Economist. |
| Saint Vincent and the Grenadines | At the UN emergency session, ambassador Inga Rhonda King stated that the country "unequivocally insists that the Russian Federation cease its military operations and immediately withdraw (its) forces from Ukraine." |
| São Tomé and Príncipe | President of São Tomé and Príncipe Carlos Vila Nova said that the country "is not in favor of war" in Ukraine and hopes that the parties can still talk "to resolve disputes". |
| Serbia | While condemning the invasion of Ukraine, Serbia refused to back sanctions against Russia. Serbia respected Ukraine's territorial integrity and considered Russia's action against it "wrong", but would not impose sanctions against Moscow, Serbian President Aleksandar Vučić said on 25 February. Vučić said the National Security Council concluded the Republic of Serbia considers "very wrong the violation of territorial integrity of a number of countries including Ukraine." Vučić also said that he would condemn Russia's recognition of the independence of separatist regions in eastern Ukraine only if Zelenskyy condemned the NATO bombing of Yugoslavia in 1999 on public television. Serbian Foreign Minister Nikola Selaković said that "Russia was Serbia's biggest support in its battle to preserve its territorial integrity and sovereignty and avoid the stigmatisation of the entire Serb people." Serbian Interior Minister Aleksandar Vulin stressed that Serbia would not join NATO: "While Aleksandar Vučić is the head of the state, you should have no dilemma as to what our attitude toward the NATO alliance is." While there was no agreement on sanctions on Russia, Serbia nevertheless expressed regrets over events, describing both Russia and Ukraine as friendly states and underlining full support for the territorial integrity of Ukraine. Serbian President Aleksandar Vučić with Russian President Vladimir Putin, 2 September 2025 After the military assault began, some Serbian pro-government newspapers hailed Russia's invasion of Ukraine, praising that Russia "overran" Ukraine, Moscow's troops "reached Kyiv in a day" and that the Russian attack on Ukraine was a "response to NATO threats". Serbian Parliament Speaker Ivica Dačić said that Serbia would never impose sanctions on its friend Russia, despite the pressure that it faced. Dačić also added that "Russia is our most influential ally for preserving our territorial integrity and sovereignty in Kosovo." The initial weak response by the government was criticised by some commentators in the country and the region. The Serbian organization Women in Black organised anti-war demonstrations in Belgrade, and the Serbian Orthodox Church organised a collection of humanitarian aid. On 2 March Serbia voted 'yes' to the UN's resolution condemning the Russian attack on Ukraine. On 16 May Serbia signed the "Tirana declaration" and deplored in the strongest terms the illegal and unjustified aggression by the Russian Federation against Ukraine in violation of Article 2(4) of the UN Charter. The Economist classifies Serbia as "neutral". |
| Turkey | Putin with Turkish President Recep Tayyip Erdoğan at the SCO Summit in Tianjin, China, 1 September 2025 Turkish President Recep Tayyip Erdoğan and the Turkish Ministry of Foreign Affairs said that Russian actions were "unacceptable" and condemned Russia for its "grave violation of international law", while reiterating "support for Ukraine's sovereignty and territorial integrity". A commercial Turkish-owned vessel was hit by a Russian bomb off the coast of Odesa. Turkish authorities said there were no casualties and the ship safely arrived in the territorial waters of Romania, a NATO ally. On 27 February, Turkish Foreign Minister Mevlüt Çavuşoğlu referred to the invasion as a "war", bringing the conflict under the 1936 Montreux Convention Regarding the Regime of the Straits and permitting Turkey to prohibit Russian warships in the Bosporus and Dardanelles. On 28 February, Erdoğan publicly confirmed the closure, and pledged to maintain relations with both Ukraine and Russia. A year after the invasion of Ukraine, The Economist downgraded Turkey from "West leaning" to "neutral". |

=== Neutral countries ===
| State | Notes |
|---|---|
| Afghanistan | On 25 February 2022 the Taliban called for "resolving the crisis through dialogue and peaceful means." |
| Angola | The Angolan government urged a ceasefire and warned that the conflict, in addition to causing human and material damage, caused "a climate of tension between the two countries, with international proportions". The Angolan Ministry of Foreign Affairs said that "the parties must strive for the peaceful resolution of the conflict." |
| Armenia | The Armenian MFA spokesman on 23 February expressed "hope that the existing problems between the two friendly states would be resolved through diplomatic dialogue", and declared Armenia's readiness to accept refugees. On 1 June 2023, during an interview, prime minister of Armenia Nikol Pashinyan stated, "Armenia is not an ally of Russia in the war in Ukraine." On 7 September 2023 Anna Hakobyan, the wife of Pashinyan, met with Ukrainian President Volodymyr Zelenskyy and his wife Olena Zelenska in Kyiv, Ukraine. She traveled to Kyiv at the invitation of the First Lady of Ukraine to participate in the "Summit of First Ladies and Gentlemen." Hakobyan personally handed over 1,000+ smartphones, tablets, and laptops for primary schoolchildren at the Ministry of Education and Science of Ukraine in Kyiv. This was Armenia's first delivery of humanitarian aid for Ukraine since the Russian invasion started in February 2022. In June 2024, Armenia participated in the Ukraine peace summit. |
| Azerbaijan | The president of Azerbaijan Ilham Aliyev expressed his support for territorial integrity of Ukraine, and urged his Ukrainian counterparts to "never to agree to the violation of your territorial integrity". Ilham Aliyev also offered to organize talks between Ukraine and Russia, instructed Azerbaijan's State Oil Company SOCAR to provide free fuel to Ukraine's ambulances and State Emergency Service and sent humanitarian aid to Ukraine. The government of Azerbaijan has taken a neutral position on the conflict, and has maintained strong cooperation with both Moscow and Kyiv. |
| Bolivia | The Ministry of Foreign Affairs stated that, as "a pacifist state", the Bolivian government urged Russia and Ukraine to avoid the use of force and seek diplomatic de-escalation "within the framework of International Law and the Charter of the United Nations". It did not explicitly condemn the Russian invasion, instead citing a "lack of dialogue and understanding" as causing further escalation in the conflict. Two days later, on 28 February, before the UN General Assembly, Bolivia rejected the "invasion and unilateral actions" of Russia. Nonetheless, Bolivia has consistently abstained from UN and OAS motions condemning Russia or demanding a cessation of hostilities and voted against expelling Russia from the United Nations Human Rights Council. A year after the invasion of Ukraine, The Economist downgraded Bolivia from "neutral" to "Russia leaning". |
| El Salvador | The Nayib Bukele administration has taken neutrality as its stance on the Russia-Ukraine conflict. |
| Egypt | Prime Minister Mostafa Madbouly expressed his hope the situation would soon be resolved. |
| Honduras | Honduras condemned the Russian invasion. In December 2023, Honduras voted against condemning Russia at the United Nations. |
| India | Russian President Vladimir Putin with Indian Prime Minister Narendra Modi at the 16th BRICS Summit on 22 October 2024. Prime Minister Narendra Modi appealed for an immediate cessation of violence in a phone call to Putin on 24 February. He also spoke with Zelenskyy on 26 February without ascribing responsibility for the violence. The Indian government refrained from taking a stand or criticizing Russia. India was also worked on trading with Russia using rupees to circumvent sanctions. India is the only member of the Quadrilateral Security Dialogue not to ban Russian exports. The Ukrainian ambassador to India, Igor Polikha, told reporters in India that he was "deeply dissatisfied" with India's position. India also abstained from the United Nations Security Council resolution condemning the Russian invasion. Many Western capitals criticised India for its refusal to condemn the invasion. UK Prime Minister Boris Johnson and Prime Minister of Japan Fumio Kishida contacted Modi and tried to persuade him to condemn the invasion. The UK also expressed concern over India's rupee-ruble trade arrangements. Foreign Minister S Jaishankar said that India would pursue an independent foreign policy and consider options in the current market to meet its energy needs. He added that imports from Russia were just a fraction of India's overall imports. |
| Kazakhstan | Kazakh President Kassym-Jomart Tokayev and Russian President Vladimir Putin in Omsk, Russia, 25 July 2026 Kazakhstan, a neighbour and ally of Russia, reportedly denied a request for its troops to join Russian forces in the invasion. The former Soviet republic also said it would not be recognizing the Russia-created breakaway republics, the Luhansk People's Republic and the Donetsk People's Republic, NBC News reported. The Kazakh defense ministry insisted the matter had not even come up. A statement issued on its Telegram channel on 27 February said: "A request to send Kazakh military to Ukraine or any other country hasn't been received and, correspondingly, hasn't been considered." Kazakhstan avoided criticising Russia's move to invade a fellow ex-Soviet republic however. President of Kazakhstan Kassym-Jomart Tokayev stated that his country would not recognize Luhansk and Donetsk Republics, which he considers to be quasi-states, because if the right of nations to self-determination was realized on the entire globe, over 500 or 600 states would emerge in the world instead of present 193, and it would result in chaos. On 25 July 2026, during a meeting with Russian President Putin in Omsk, Kazakh President Tokayev called for the Russo-Ukrainian war to be “frozen” and for negotiations to resume on the basis of what he described as the “Istanbul Formula 2.0”. He expressed concern over the continued loss of life and said that the conflict should be brought to an end. |
| Kyrgyzstan | The Foreign Ministry of Kyrgyzstan called on Russia and Ukraine to negotiate. "We're following the development of the situation in Ukraine with dismay and concern. Proceeding from our historically friendly relations with the peoples of Russia and Ukraine, we hope that the parties will achieve peace promptly, including by means of creating new formats and mechanisms of the conflict settlement at the negotiating table to prevent further casualties and damage," the Kyrgyz Foreign Ministry said on Friday. President Sadyr Japarov commented that the invasion may have been necessary "to protect the peaceful population of the territories of Donbas." That prompted Ukrainian president Volodymyr Zelenskyy to recall Ukraine's ambassador to Kyrgyzstan to protest the country's statement "justifying the aggression against Ukraine." |
| Mongolia | Putin and Mongolian President Ukhnaagiin Khürelsükh in Ulaanbaatar, Mongolia, 3 September 2024 Battsetseg Batmunkh, Mongolia's foreign minister, said the government was observing events with concern. She noted that "if the situation continued to escalate it may contribute negatively to world peace and stability", and called on the parties to quickly negotiate a ceasefire. In advance of a visit by Putin to Mongolia on 3 September 2024, the ICC stated that Mongolia was obligated to place Putin under arrest, due to Mongolia being a signatory of the Rome Statute of the ICC. After failure to make the arrest, Mongolia was described by Ukraine as complicit in Putin's war crimes. |
| Morocco | Morocco's Foreign Ministry released a statement reiterating its support for the territorial integrity of all UN states. The country was absent from the 2 March UN General Assembly vote condemning the invasion. According to several reports, Morocco had authorized a secret delivery of twenty refurbished T-72B tanks to Ukraine by early 2023. In response, foreign minister Nasser Bourita later denied this, and said that Morocco was engaged in a policy of "positive neutrality". |
| Namibia | Namibia called on the United Nations to peacefully resolve the situation. The Namibian Government also looked to evacuate 100 Namibians in Ukraine, should it become necessary. |
| Pakistan | Pakistan's Prime Minister, Imran Khan, said that conflict was not in anyone's interest. Khan also underlined Pakistan's belief that disputes should be resolved through dialogue and diplomacy. After an appeal from 22 diplomatic missions for Pakistan to condemn Russia at the UN General Assembly was released to the public, Khan hit out at Western envoys over their inaction over Kashmir, said supporting NATO in Afghanistan had backfired for Pakistan, and asked why no letter was written to appeal to India, which had also abstained. Islamabad views Moscow as a key long-term partner in Central Asia and the Middle East, looking for increased trade and investment in the region to supplement its national development. Pakistan's Prime Minister, Imran Khan stated "We are friends of Russia, and we are also friends of the United States. We are friends of China and Europe." Pakistan has been considered among the countries to be Russia leaning since the invasion of Ukraine according to The Economist. Ambassador of Russia to Pakistan, Mr. Danila Ganich termed mutual relations between Russia and Pakistan as crucial for both countries' national interests and global stability. |
| Qatar | Amir Sheikh Tamim bin Hamad Al Thani called on all parties to exercise restraint and resolve the dispute through constructive dialogue and diplomatic methods. He cautioned against further escalation. A year after the invasion of Ukraine, The Economist downgraded Qatar from "West leaning" to "neutral". |
| Saudi Arabia | Saudi Arabia's Deputy Foreign Minister Waleed El Khereiji and U.S. Deputy Secretary of State Wendy Sherman on the first day of the invasion discussed a "strong international response to support Ukrainian sovereignty", according to the U.S. Department of State website. Saudi Arabia remained committed to the OPEC+ agreement, Crown Prince Mohammed bin Salman told French President Emmanuel Macron on 27 February, in an endorsement for the bloc's alliance with Russia in its invasion of Ukraine. |
| South Africa | Naledi Pandor, Minister of the Department of International Relations and Cooperation (DIRCO), blamed neither Russia nor Ukraine, calling for "inclusive talks led by the UNSC" and "enhanced diplomacy". The Head of Public Diplomacy at DIRCO said that South Africa had "adopted a non-aligned position", discouraged the imposition of sanctions and called on NATO to respect Russian security concerns. The provincial cabinet of the Western Cape Province passed a resolution criticizing the Russian invasion. It called for a full withdrawal of Russian forces and criticized the ambiguous position of the South African government. A year after the invasion of Ukraine, The Economist downgraded South Africa from "neutral" to "Russia leaning". |
| Sri Lanka | The Ministry of Foreign Affairs stated that the Government of Sri Lanka was deeply concerned about the escalation of violence in Ukraine and called on all parties to exercise maximum restraint and work towards the immediate cessation of hostilities, to maintain peace, security and stability in the region, and emphasised the need for diplomacy and sincere dialogue. |
| Tajikistan | Tajikistan has decided to maintain its neutral stance in response to Russia's invasion of Ukraine, and its authorities have not yet made any official statements on the situation. Since Russia invaded Ukraine, Tajikistan has been comparatively the most exposed of the five Central Asian countries. A few other countries in the region, including Tajikistan, decided not to take part in the UNGA's emergency special session on the Russian invasion of Ukraine in March 2022. Tajikistan, in particular, is heavily reliant on Russia for its energy, economic, and security requirements. In reality, Russia is Tajikistan's most significant trading and security partner. |
| United Arab Emirates | The United Arab Emirates abstained from the vote on the U.N. Security Council resolution deploring the invasion, calling it a "foregone conclusion". A senior Emirati diplomat Anwar Gargash said that the United Arab Emirates "believes that taking sides would only lead to more violence". The United Arab Emirates representative to the UN stating "the UAE.. articulates its firm position on the need to de-escalate and find a peaceful solution to the crisis between the parties concerned." |
| Uzbekistan | Putin with Uzbek President Shavkat Mirziyoyev and other post-Soviet leaders at the Moscow Victory Day Parade on 9 May 2023 Press Secretary to the President of Uzbekistan Sherzod Asadov said in a Facebook post: "The President of Russia informed the head of our state of the reasons and circumstances of the decision to launch a special operation. In his turn, the leader of Uzbekistan expressed hope that the parties will soon find mutually acceptable ways to resolve the situation and prevent its further escalation. I would like to emphasize that Uzbekistan takes a balanced, neutral position on this matter." The Embassy of Uzbekistan in Poland is evacuating its citizens from Ukraine through Poland, Foreign Ministry of Uzbekistan said. Upon reports of Uzbek nationals fighting in Ukraine, Ministry of Justice stated that any Uzbek national found to have enlisted in the service of a foreign army or police service could face a prison term of up to five years. On 17 March, Uzbekistan Foreign Minister Abdulaziz Kamilov said that he did not recognize the independence of the LPR and the DPR, supported the territorial integrity of Ukraine and wanted a peaceful solution to the situation. He added that Uzbekistan had provided humanitarian aid to Ukraine and would continue this work. He also noted that the country intended to cooperate on both sides of the conflict. |
| Vietnam | Putin and Nguyễn Phú Trọng, the General Secretary of the Communist Party of Vietnam in Hanoi, Vietnam, 20 June 2024 The spokesperson for the Vietnamese Ministry of Foreign Affairs, Lê Thị Thu Hằng, stated Vietnam "calls on parties concerned in the Ukraine crisis to exercise self-restraint, enhance dialogue efforts and step up diplomatic measures to peacefully settle differences with respect for the United Nations Charter and fundamental principles of international law, thus contributing to ensuring peace, security, and stability in the region and the world." |
| Zambia | In response to questions from an MP, Vice president Mutale Nalumango stated that Zambia could not make a unilateral decision regarding the conflict, and that they would "not make a position as an individual country but as a grouping to various bodies that the country belongs to". The country also made plans to evacuate all known Zambians in the country. At the emergency special session the Zambia's representative announced the country would support the draft resolution condemning the invasion. |

==== Non UN members ====
| State | Notes |
|---|---|
| Holy See | Pope Francis has stated that the events in Ukraine have caused "great pain in his heart". The pope called for 2 March 2022, Ash Wednesday, to be a day of prayer and fasting for peace. In an unprecedented departure from diplomatic protocol, the pope went to the Russian embassy on 25 February 2022, to relay his concern over Russia's invasion of Ukraine to Moscow's ambassador. |
| Sovereign Military Order of Malta | In a press release, the Sovereign Military Order of Malta announced that they were supplying Ukraine refugees with "emergency relief, food and psychosocial support." |

=== Leans to Russia ===
Many of these countries are described as neutral but have remained friendly with Russia ever since it was isolated by the international community.

| State | Notes |
|---|---|
| Algeria | Putin and Algerian President Abdelmadjid Tebboune at the St. Petersburg International Economic Forum, 16 June 2023 The Algerian Ministry of Foreign Affairs said it was "following developments" and called for Algerians in Ukraine to adhere to instructions given by the Algerian embassy. The Algerian government attempted to adopt a Russia-leaning stance without explicitly expressing support for Russia's invasion. This included denying plans to replace Russian gas exports to Europe and opposing a statement that the Ukrainian embassy in Algeria had released that stated the country wanted to hire "foreign nationals to join the resistance against the Russian occupation and defend global security". |
| China | Putin with Xi Jinping, the General Secretary of the Chinese Communist Party before the Moscow Victory Day Parade, 8 May 2025 Chinese leader and General Secretary of the Chinese Communist Party Xi Jinping spoke to Russian President Vladimir Putin on 25 February, calling for Russia and Ukraine to resolve the issue through negotiation. Putin told Xi that "Russia is willing to conduct high-level negotiations with Ukraine." China's UN Ambassador Zhang Jun said that "We believe that all countries should solve international disputes by peaceful means in line with the purposes and principles of the UN Charter." In a 25 February statement, Chinese Foreign Minister and State Councilor Wang Yi said that Ukraine's territory and sovereignty should be respected and urged talks as soon as possible. Ambassador to Ukraine Fan Xianrong and Foreign Ministry spokesperson Zhao Lijian echoed the sentiment in March 2022. Various state media in Beijing quoted Scholz's description of the day of invasion as "a terrible day for Ukraine and a dark day for Europe." China criticized sanctions against Russia, and said it understood Russia's 'security concerns' over NATO's eastward expansion. China's Vice Foreign Minister Le Yucheng claimed that if NATO "enlargement goes further, it would be approaching the 'outskirts of Moscow' where a missile could hit the Kremlin within seven or eight minutes." On 22 February 2023, China blamed the invasion on the United States. In December 2023, China voted against condemning Russia at the United Nations. |
| Ethiopia | Ethiopia's Prime Minister Abiy Ahmed has called for restraint in the Ukraine conflict, noting his country's own suffering during the Tigray War. The statement notably did not condemn Russia for invading its neighbor. On 14 November 2022, Ethiopia sided with Russia on a UN General Assembly vote calling for Russia to pay war reparations to Ukraine. Ethiopia has been considered among the countries to be Russia leaning since the invasion of Ukraine according to The Economist. |
| Laos | Putin and Thongloun Sisoulith, the General Secretary of the Lao People's Revolutionary Party before the Moscow Victory Day Parade, 8 May 2025 The Lao PDR government called on all parties to exercise utmost restraint and pursue efforts to deescalate and supported efforts to find a peaceful settlement through diplomatic means. Laos has been considered among the countries to be Russia leaning since the invasion of Ukraine according to The Economist. The Lao state-run news agency reliably repeated comments from Russian diplomats, including in a briefing in early May that "with the help of foreign countries, Ukraine has become a center of attraction for terrorists and mercenaries" and "The West is openly encouraging Kiev to attack Russia." Diplomatic, military, and trade overtures with Russia have increased. |
| Uganda | Muhoozi Kainerugaba, son of Ugandan President Yoweri Museveni and commander of the Special Forces Command, stated that Uganda could send soldiers to Russia to help Putin quell the rebellion if necessary. Uganda has been considered among the countries to be Russia leaning since the invasion of Ukraine according to The Economist. |

==== Non UN members ====
| State | Notes |
|---|---|
| Artsakh (Note: Artsakh (or the Nagorno-Karabakh Republic) was a self-proclaimed breakaway state in the South Caucasus, whose territory was internationally recognised as part of Azerbaijan.) | President of Artsakh Arayik Harutyunyan welcomed the decision of President of the Russian Federation Vladimir Putin to recognize the independence of the Donetsk and Luhansk People's Republics. The Government of the Artsakh Republic sent 14 tons of humanitarian aid to the residents of the Kyiv and Zaporizhzhia regions through Russian peacekeeping troops in Artsakh. |
| Transnistria (Note: Transnistria's political status is disputed. It considers itself to be an independent state, but this is not recognised by any UN member state. The Moldovan government and the international community consider Transnistria a part of Moldova's territory.) | On 26 February, Vadim Krasnoselski, the president of the breakaway state of Transnistria internationally recognized as part of Moldova, in response to what he called rumors and false information that Transnistria would attack Ukraine, said that Transnistria was a peaceful state, never had plans to attack its neighbours and called those who spread these claims people without control over the situation or provocateurs with malicious intentions. Krasnoselski also noted the large ethnically Ukrainian population in Transnistria and that Ukrainian is taught in Transnistrian schools and is one of the official languages of the republic. |

=== Supports Russia ===
| State | Notes |
|---|---|
| Belarus | Belarus has taken an active stance of supporting Russia in its invasion of Ukraine. Belarus has let Russian troops freely use their territory to cross the border into the northern side of Ukraine (see Belarusian involvement in the Russian invasion of Ukraine). |
| Burkina Faso | President Ibrahim Traoré stated "There is a desire to change politics which leads us to turn our backs on our traditional partners and turn towards our true friends like Russia." |
| Burundi | Burundi's foreign minister insisted that his country would not take sides in Russia's war against Ukraine. However, in December 2023, Burundi reversed this position and voted against condemning Russia at the United Nations. In recent years, Burundi has consistently voted with Russia at the United Nations in regards to Ukraine. |
| Central African Republic | On 14 November 2022, the Central African Republic sided with the Russian Federation on a UN General Assembly vote calling for Russia to pay war reparations to Ukraine. In 2023, President Faustin-Archange Touadéra expressed support for Russian involvement in Ukraine. |
| Cuba | Putin and Miguel Díaz-Canel, the First Secretary of the Communist Party of Cuba in Kremlin, Moscow, 9 May 2024 The Cuban government blamed the United States for the crisis in Ukraine and backed Russia's right to "self-defense", but said the conflict should be resolved diplomatically. |
| Eritrea | Eritrea was one of five countries that voted against the UN General Assembly resolution condemning Russia. In 2023, President Isaias Afwerki expressed support for the Russian involvement in Ukraine. |
| Iran | Putin with Iranian Supreme Leader Ali Khamenei and Iranian President Ebrahim Raisi in Tehran, Iran, 19 July 2022 Iranian president Ebrahim Raisi phoned Putin to support stopping NATO expansion. Iranian Foreign Minister Hossein Amirabdollahian tweeted, "The #Ukraine crisis is rooted in NATO's provocations. We don't believe that resorting to war is a solution. Imperative to establish ceasefire & to find a political and democratic resolution." Additionally, he stated that Iran would not be recognizing Crimea, or the other regions of Ukraine as property of Russia, because "Iran recognizes the sovereignty and territorial integrity of the countries." Mohammad Javad Larijani, secretary of the High Council for Human Rights in Iran, told IRNA that the government had not backed the military operation against Ukraine, but Tehran "has not closed eyes on the plots hatched by the US and its allies." Supreme Leader Ali Khamenei said that "in Ukraine, we are in favour of stopping the war", and that the crisis showed that the West could not be trusted, and its support for "administrations and politicians that have been installed by them" was a "mirage". He also implied that the Ukrainian government lacked the full support of its people. He blamed US policies for the invasion and accused Washington of meddling in the "internal affairs of the country, setting up demonstrations against the government, creating velvet revolutions, creating colour coup d'etats". |
| Mali | Putin with Assimi Goïta at the Russia–Africa Summit in St. Petersburg, July 2023 In 2023, Malian military junta leader Assimi Goïta expressed support for Russian involvement in Ukraine. |
| Myanmar | The spokesperson for Myanmar's State Administration Council, Zaw Min Tun, supported Russia, stating that it "was acting to protect its sovereignty" and praised Russia's role in "balancing global power". |
| Nicaragua | President Daniel Ortega and his wife, Vice President Rosario Murillo, expressed their support to Putin's deployment of troops to Ukraine after its recognition of the separatist Donetsk and Luhansk People's Republics. Ortega accused NATO and the United States of allegedly conspiring the 2014 Revolution of Dignity which resulted in the removal from office of president Viktor Yanukovych. |
| Niger | Since the 2023 Nigerien coup d'état, the ruling National Council for the Safeguard of the Homeland has voted against condemning Russia at the United Nations. Under the previous government, Niger was one of 87 signatories to the UN letter condemning Russia's invasion of Ukraine. |
| North Korea | Putin with Kim Jong Un, the General Secretary of the Workers' Party of Korea in Pyongyang, North Korea, 19 June 2024 North Korea's Ministry of Foreign Affairs published a commentary on 26 February titled "The United States must not undermine the foundation of international peace and stability", ascribing the armed conflict to US "high-handedness and arbitrariness," and accusing Washington of pursuing "military supremacy" in disregard of Russian security concerns. In a post on the foreign ministry website, Ri Ji-song, a researcher at the Society for International Politics Study, made the remarks—the North's first public mention of the conflict following Russia's invasion of Ukraine earlier that week. "The root cause of the Ukrainian crisis also lies in the high-handedness and arbitrariness of the U.S. which has held on solely to the unilateral sanction and pressure while pursuing only global hegemony and military supremacy in disregard of the legitimate demand of Russia for its security," Ri wrote. The Yonhap News Agency quoted a North Korean studies professor at Ewha University in Seoul as calling the post a "cautious" official response from Pyongyang, since it was released in the name of an individual. In the fall of 2024, North Korea sent military personnel to Russia who fought against Ukraine for Russia in Russian uniforms and under Russian command (see North Korean involvement in the Russian invasion of Ukraine). |
| Sudan | Sudan coordinated an evacuation of Sudanese citizens in Ukraine with authorities in Poland and Romania. The Deputy Head of the Sovereign Council Mohamed Hamdan Dagalo stated: "Russia has the right to act in the interests of its citizens and protect its people. It has the right under the constitution and under the law. The whole world must realize that it has the right to defend its people." Sudan has been considered among the countries to be Russia leaning since the invasion of Ukraine according to The Economist. In recent years, Sudan has consistently voted with Russia at the United Nations in regards to Ukraine. |
| Syria (before 2024) | President Bashar al-Assad praised the Russian invasion as a "correction of history" and accused Western nations of using "dirty methods to support terrorists in Syria and Nazis in Ukraine". |
| Venezuela (before 2026) | The country's government blamed NATO and the United States for the crisis in Ukraine, stating that they had violated the Minsk agreements. President Nicolás Maduro said before the invasion was launched that Venezuela was with Putin, but also urged a diplomatic dialogue to avoid an increase in the conflict. Maduro officially sent "a hug of solidarity" to Putin, whom he described as a "brother of Venezuela." |
| Zimbabwe | Zimbabwe evacuated 256 nationals from Ukraine, advising nationals to leave Ukraine if safe to do so. On 14 November 2022, Zimbabwe sided with the Russian Federation on a UN General Assembly vote calling for Russia to pay war reparations to Ukraine. In 2023, Zimbabwe's President Emmerson Mnangagwa voiced support for the Russian invasion of Ukraine. |

==== Non UN members ====
| State | Notes |
|---|---|
| Abkhazia (Note: Abkhazia's status is disputed. It is internationally recognized in whole as part the country of Georgia. Abkhazia is recognized as independent by five UN member states as well as four partially or wholly unrecognized states.) | President Aslan Bzhaniya stated that Russia's invasion of Ukraine was "absolutely justified." |
| South Ossetia (Note: South Ossetia's status is disputed. It is internationally recognized in whole as part of the country of Georgia. South Ossetia is recognized as independent by five UN member states as well as four partially or wholly unrecognized states.) | The Ministry of Foreign Affairs issued a statement: "The Republic of South Ossetia expresses its support for the decision of the Russian Federation to conduct the special military operation to protect the residents of Donbas from the current nationalist regime of Kyiv." On 26 March 2022, South Ossetian President Anatoly Bibilov began sending troops to Ukraine to assist Russia with the invasion. |

== Expulsion of diplomats ==
More than a dozen countries expelled Russian diplomats following the invasion, citing espionage activities incompatible with diplomatic status, and then also Russian killing of civilians in the Bucha massacre. Additionally, the European Union declared 19 Russian diplomats personae non-gratae.

| Country | Diplomats expelled | Date announced | Notes |
|---|---|---|---|
| Austria | 4 | 7 April | Additionally, on 4 May 2026 Austria additionally expelled 4 diplomats for espionage. |
| Belgium | 21 | 29 March | |
| Bulgaria | 10 + 70 | 18 March | On 28 June 2022, Bulgaria additionally expelled 70 diplomats for espionage and interference in internal affairs. |
| Croatia | 24 | 11 April | 18 diplomats and six members of the administrative staff at the Russian Embassy: 24 employees in total. |
| Czech Republic | 1 | 30 March | |
| Denmark | 15 | 5 April | |
| Estonia | 3 + 14 | 18 March | On 5 April 2022, Estonia closed two consulates and expelled additional 14 diplomats/staff. |
| Finland | 2 | 8 April | In addition, one Russian embassy employee has been denied a visa extension. |
| France | 35 + 6 | 4 April | On 11 April 2022, France expelled six more Russian diplomats. |
| Germany | 40 | 4 April | |
| Greece | 12 | 6 April | |
| Republic of Ireland | 4 | 29 March | |
| Italy | 30 | 5 April | |
| Japan | 8 | 8 April | |
| Latvia | 3 + 13 | 18 March | On 5 April 2022, Latvia closed two consulates and expelled additional 13 diplomats/staff. |
| Lithuania | 4 + 1 | 18 March | On 4 April 2022, Lithuania also expelled the Russian ambassador and closed one consulate. |
| Luxembourg | 1 | 6 April | |
| Montenegro | 1 + 4 | 4 March | On 7 April 2022, Montenegro expelled four more Russian diplomats. |
| Netherlands | 17 | 29 March | |
| North Macedonia | 5 + 6 | 28 March | On 15 April 2022, North Macedonia expelled six more Russian diplomats. |
| Norway | 3 | 6 April | |
| Poland | 45 | 23 March | |
| Portugal | 10 | 5 April | |
| Romania | 10 | 5 April | |
| Slovakia | 3 + 35 | 14 March | On 30 March 2022, Slovakia expelled 35 more Russian diplomats. |
| Slovenia | 33 | 5 April | |
| Spain | 25 (about) | 5 April | |
| Sweden | 3 | 5 April | |
| United States | 12 | 28 February | Expelled diplomats are from the UN delegation. |

== Intergovernmental and international organizations ==
Russia Countries that have introduced sanctions on Russia in 2014: Countries that have introduced sanctions European Union countries that have collectively introduced sanctions

- United Nations – Secretary-General António Guterres stated that the Russian invasion was "the saddest moment in my tenure" and called on Putin to withdraw his troops "in the name of humanity". On 25 February, the Security Council failed to adopt a draft resolution which would have "deplored, in the strongest terms, the Russian Federation's aggression" on Ukraine. Of the 15 member states on the Security Council, 11 were in support, whilst three abstained from voting. The draft resolution failed due to a Russian veto. Due to the deadlock, the Security Council passed a resolution to convene the General Assembly for the eleventh emergency special session. On 2 March, the General Assembly voted to deplore "in the strongest possible terms" Russia's aggression against Ukraine by a vote of 141 to 5, with 35 abstentions. The resolution also called for the Russian Federation to "immediately cease its use of force against Ukraine" and "immediately, completely and unconditionally withdraw all of its military forces." Only Russia, Belarus, Syria, North Korea and Eritrea voted against the resolution. On 4 March, the UN Human Rights Council adopted a resolution by a vote of 32 to 2, with 13 abstentions, calling for the withdrawal of Russian troops and Russian-backed armed groups from Ukraine and humanitarian access to people in need. The resolution also established a commission to investigate alleged rights violations committed during Russia's military attack on Ukraine. On 23 March, the UN Security Council failed to back a Russian humanitarian resolution calling for the protection of civilians and their safe passage. It was criticised by French and American representatives for not mentioning Russia's role in the ongoing crisis. On 24 March, the UN General Assembly voted 140 to 5 in favor of a resolution approving aid access and civilian protection in Ukraine, which again criticized Russia's invasion of Ukraine. On 7 April, the UN General Assembly voted 93–24, with 58 abstentions, to suspend Russia from the UN Human Rights Council.
- African Union – Chairman of the African Union Commission Moussa Faki and Chair of the African Union and Senegalese president Macky Sall called on Russia and "any other regional or international actor to imperatively respect international law, territorial integrity and national sovereignty of Ukraine" and urged both parties to the conflict to establish an immediate ceasefire and start political negotiations without delay.
- Arctic Council – On 3 March, all member states of the Arctic Council besides Russia (Canada, Denmark, Finland, Iceland, Norway, Sweden, and the United States) released a joint statement condemning the Russian invasion of Ukraine, describing it as a flagrant violation of the organization's "core principles of sovereignty and territorial integrity". They also noted, "the grave impediments to international cooperation, including in the Arctic, that Russia's actions have caused". The seven members announced they would no longer attend meetings of the Council in Russia, which currently holds the organization's rotating chairmanship.
- ASEAN – Foreign ministers of ASEAN expressed grave concern over Russia-Ukraine tensions and urged maximum restraint and dialogue.
- Baltic Assembly – The Baltic Assembly published a statement in which it "firmly condemns the Russian invasion of Ukraine".
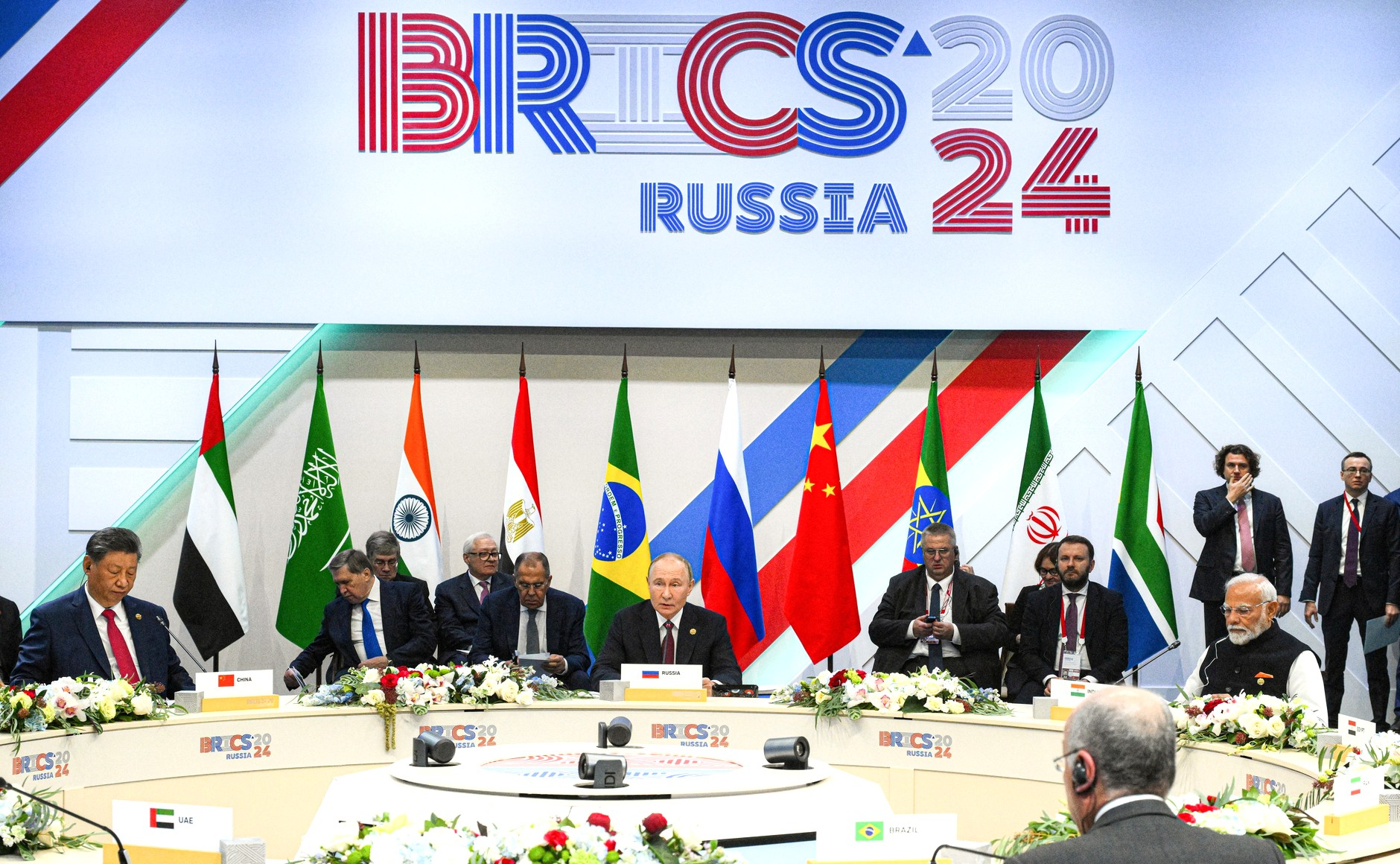
  Putin and other leaders at the 16th BRICS summit in Kazan, Russia. Most of the Global South countries took a neutral position towards the war and maintained good relations with Russia.
- BRICS – At the 16th BRICS Summit in Kazan, Russia in October 2024, the Kazan Declaration emphasized adherence to the UN Charter and supported diplomatic efforts for a peaceful resolution to the conflict in Ukraine.
- Caribbean Community – A statement issued on behalf of the Caribbean Community condemned the invasion of Ukraine and demanded an "immediate and complete withdrawal" of Russia's military from Ukraine.
- Council of Europe – The Committee of Ministers passed a resolution that "condemned in the strongest terms the armed attack on Ukraine" and called for Russia to "immediately and unconditionally cease its military operations" On 25 February, the Committee of Ministers of the Council of Europe suspended Russia from its rights of representation in the Committee of Ministers and in the Parliamentary Assembly. In the following days, the European Court of Human Rights granted interim measures indicating to Russia that it should refrain from military attacks against civilians and civilian objects and should ensure access to safe evacuation routes, healthcare, food and other essential supplies, rapid and unconstrained passage of humanitarian aid, and movement of humanitarian workers. Russia accused NATO and EU members of having undermined the Council of Europe, and announced its intention to withdraw from the organisation. On 15 March, Russia notified the council of its decision to withdraw and to denounce the European Convention on Human Rights by the end of 2022. The following day, the Committee of Ministers decided to expel Russia from the Council of Europe with immediate effect.
- European Union – President of the European Commission Ursula von der Leyen tweeted; "We will not let President Putin tear down Europe's security architecture" and Foreign Policy Chief Josep Borrell called on Putin to stop the "senseless aggression". President of the European Parliament, Roberta Metsola called for "immediate, quick, solid and swift action" and convened an extraordinary session of Parliament for 1 March.
- Economic Community of West African States – ECOWAS released a statement that condemned the invasion and called for both parties to stop the fighting. Instead, ECOWAS urged for both parties to use dialogue to solve differences for sake of the interest of peace in the region.
- International Criminal Court – Neither Ukraine nor Russia are parties to the Rome Statute, however, the Ukrainian government has voluntarily accepted the jurisdiction of the International Criminal Court since 2015 for any possible war crimes committed on Ukrainian territory since 20 February 2014. The Prosecutor of the International Criminal Court, Karim Ahmad Khan, issued a statement on 25 February reminding all parties involved that the Office of the Prosecutor (OTP) has jurisdiction to investigate any act of genocide, war crimes, or crimes against humanity and that "any person who commits such crimes, including by ordering, inciting, or contributing in another manner to the commission of these crimes, may be liable to prosecution before the Court." Khan issued a follow-up statement on 28 February that the OTP had a reasonable basis to begin an investigation under article 15(3) of the Rome Statute pending approval from the Pre-Trial Chamber of the court. The approval requirement was bypassed after 39 states parties (Note: 38 states parties (Albania, Australia, Austria, Belgium, Bulgaria, Canada, Colombia, Costa Rica, Croatia, Cyprus, Czech Republic, Denmark, Estonia, Finland, France, Georgia, Germany, Greece, Hungary, Iceland, Ireland, Italy, Latvia, Liechtenstein, Luxembourg, Malta, New Zealand, Norway, the Netherlands, Poland, Portugal, Romania, Slovakia, Slovenia, Spain, Sweden, Switzerland, and the United Kingdom) jointly referred the matter to the OTP on 2 March; Lithuania submitted an earlier, separate referral on 28 February.) referred the situation in Ukraine to the OTP and the formal investigation commenced on 2 March. On 17 March 2023, International Criminal Court Issued arrest warrants for Vladimir Putin and Maria Lvova-Belova.
- International Energy Agency – On 25 February, the IEA's thirty-one member countries "expressed great concern over the destruction and loss of life" and said they would closely monitor impacts on energy markets. In response to the threat the Russian invasion posed to global oil markets, on 1 March the IEA Governing Board authorized the release of 61.7 million barrels of oil from member countries' strategic petroleum reserves. IEA Executive Director Fatih Birol said, "The situation in energy markets is very serious and demands our full attention. Global energy security is under threat, putting the world economy at risk during a fragile stage of recovery." On 1 April, the Governing Board announced a second release of emergency oil stocks, making another 120 million barrels available for oil markets.
- NATO – Secretary General Jens Stoltenberg condemned the attack and called it a "grave breach of international law". A separate statement announced an intention to deploy defensive forces and condemned Belarus for enabling the attack. On 8 March, Stoltenberg warned that "if there is any attack against any NATO country, NATO territory, that will trigger Article 5" of the North Atlantic Treaty. On 13 March, Joe Biden's national security adviser Jake Sullivan warned of a full-fledged NATO response if Russia hit any part of NATO territory.
- Nordic Council – President Erkki Tuomioja condemned the invasion as "completely unjust" and stated that it was "contrary to both international law and the order of European security."
- Organization of American States – The OAS condemned the attack as an affront to mankind and an attack on civilised international relations. On 21 April OAS voted to suspend Russian permanent observer status in the organization. 25 nations voted in favour, 8 abstained and none voted against the motion.
- Organisation for Economic Co-operation and Development – The OECD Council formally terminated accession negotiations with Russia and ordered the closure of OECD offices in Moscow.
- Organization for Security and Co-operation in Europe – OSCE Chairman Zbigniew Rau and Secretary General Helga Schmid issued a joint statement on 24 February 2022 condemning the invasion. All international members of the multi-national OSCE Special Monitoring Mission to Ukraine, which had been deployed in the country since 21 March 2014, were evacuated beginning 24 February. A Ukrainian member of the OSCE mission, Maryna Fenina, was killed on 1 March during the shelling of Kharkiv.
- Pacific Islands Forum – In a statement, Secretary-General Henry Puna condemned the invasion, saying the group "observed from afar the violation of Ukraine's sovereignty and territorial integrity, as well as Russia's blatant disregard for international law."

=== NATO ===
US F-35s arrive in Ämari Air Base in Estonia on 27 February.

Following the 24 February 2022 Russian invasion of Ukraine, eight NATO member states – Bulgaria, the Czech Republic, Estonia, Latvia, Lithuania, Poland, Romania, and Slovakia – triggered security consultations under Article 4. The Estonian government issued a statement by Prime Minister Kaja Kallas saying: "Russia's widespread aggression is a threat to the entire world and to all NATO countries, and NATO consultations on strengthening the security of the Allies must be initiated to implement additional measures for ensuring the defence of NATO Allies. The most effective response to Russia's aggression is unity." On 24 February, Stoltenberg announced new plans that "will enable us to deploy capabilities and forces, including the NATO Response Force, to where they are needed". Following the invasion, NATO announced plans to increase military deployments in the Baltics, Poland, and Romania.

After the 25 February UN Security Council meeting, Stoltenberg announced that parts of the NATO Response Force would be deployed, for the first time ever, to NATO members along the eastern border. He stated that forces would include elements of the Very High Readiness Joint Task Force (VJTF), led by France. The US announced on 24 February that it would deploy 7,000 troops to join the 5,000 already in Europe. NATO forces included the USS Harry S. Truman's Carrier Strike Group 8, which entered the Mediterranean Sea the previous week as part of a planned exercise. The carrier strike group was placed under NATO command, the first time this had occurred since the Cold War.

As Russia began to build forces on Ukraine's border in the lead-up to the invasion, Finland and Sweden, both neutral states, increased their cooperation with NATO. Both countries attended the emergency NATO summit as members of NATO's Partnership for Peace, and both condemned the invasion and provided assistance to Ukraine. On 25 February, Russian Foreign Ministry spokesperson Maria Zakharova threatened Finland and Sweden with "military and political consequences" if they attempted to join NATO. Both Finnish and Swedish public opinion shifted in favour of joining NATO after the invasion. A public petition asking the Parliament of Finland to hold a referendum to join NATO reached the required 50,000 signatures, prompting a parliamentary discussion on 1 March.

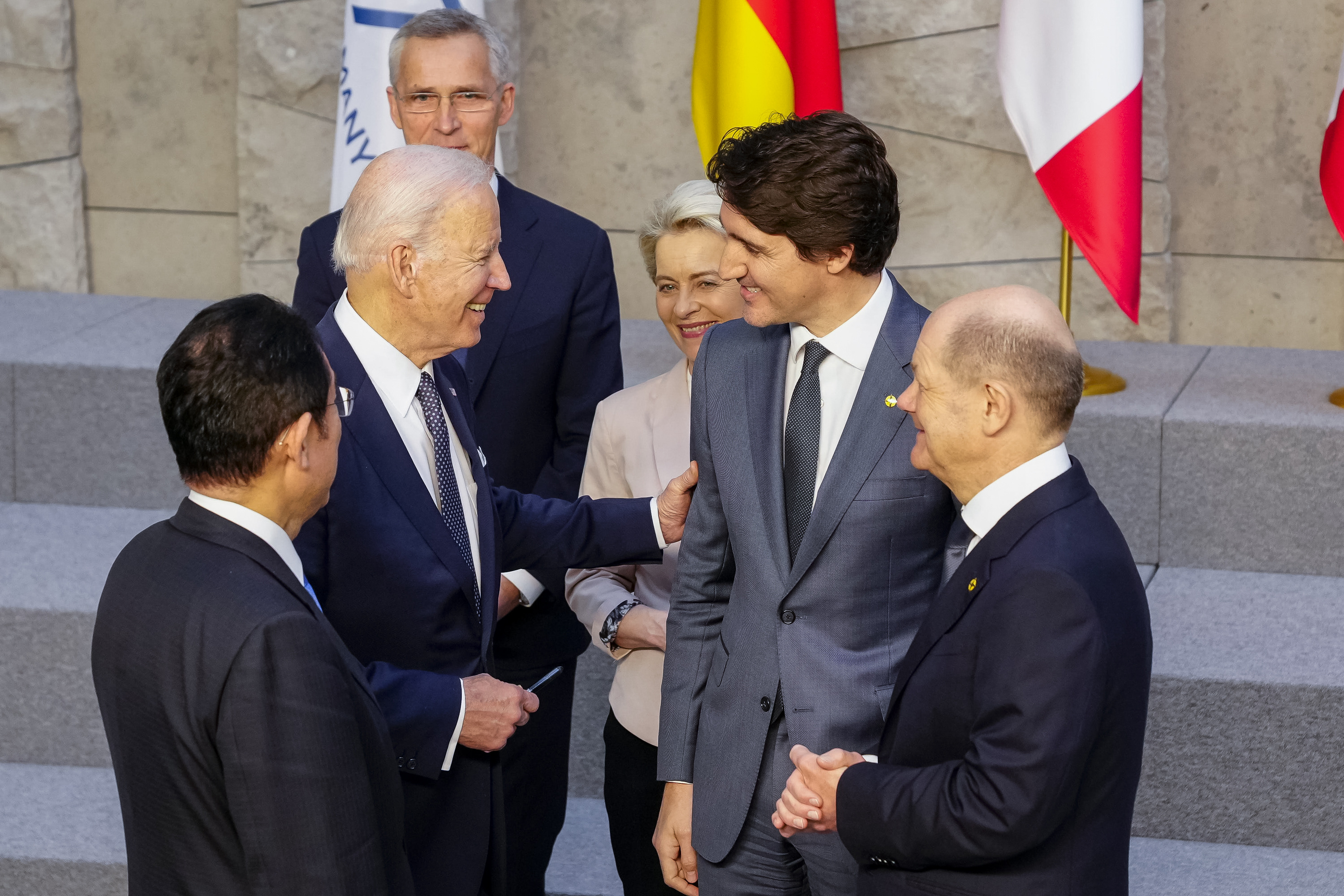
Western leaders met in Brussels for a round of emergency summits of NATO, the European Council and the G7 to discuss the war in Ukraine, 23 March 2022

On 8 March, NATO Secretary General Jens Stoltenberg warned that "any attack against any NATO country [or] NATO territory ... will trigger Article 5 of the North Atlantic Treaty. On 11 March, Biden proclaimed that while the United States would, as part of NATO, "defend every single inch of NATO territory with [its] full might", NATO would not "fight a war against Russia in Ukraine", as such "direct conflict between NATO and Russia is World War III, something we must strive to prevent".

On 13 March, Jake Sullivan, the United States National Security Advisor to President Biden, warned of a full-fledged NATO response if Russia were to hit any part of NATO territory. Sullivan added on 22 March, during Biden's trip to Europe to discuss updating NATO's posture towards Russia, that Biden would emphasize three key issues: new sanctions against Russia and tightening existing sanctions, longer-term adjustments to NATO force posture and contingencies in the case of nuclear weapons use, and 'joint action' on enhancing energy security in Europe, which is highly reliant on Russian gas. Zelenskyy repeatedly urged NATO to impose a no-fly zone over Ukraine, which was rejected by the organization as it would involve shooting down Russian aircraft, an act that would significantly escalate the war to involve NATO.

On 16 March, a meeting of NATO defence ministers agreed to continue supplying Ukraine with military, financial and humanitarian aid, though Stoltenberg ruled out the deployment of forces in Ukraine or a no-fly-zone, saying NATO has "a responsibility" not to escalate the war beyond Ukraine.

Upon his arrival for the 2022 Brussels extraordinary summit on 24 March, Biden increased the amount of new aid offered to Ukraine by one billion dollars and announced added guarantees for NATO obligations to protect all NATO-allied nations which border Ukraine. On 28 March, Biden, at the end of his NATO trip to Europe, reaffirmed his condemnation of Putin, saying that he would "'make no apologies'" for previously stating that "'Putin cannot remain in power'". On 29 March, Kallas sided with Biden's condemnation and called for the further isolation of Putin from international politics. As part of the NATO Enhanced Forward Presence, NATO countries agreed to establish four multinational battalion-sized battlegroups in Bulgaria, Hungary, Romania, and Slovakia, on top of four existing battlegroups in Estonia, Latvia, Lithuania, and Poland.

On 6 and 7 April, foreign ministers from NATO member states as well as Ukraine, the European Union, Finland, Sweden, Japan, New Zealand and Australia convened to discuss further sanctions on Russia and additional arms deliveries to Ukraine.

=== European Union ===
On 27 February 2022, European Commission president Ursula von der Leyen announced that the European Union would ban Russian state-owned media outlets RT and Sputnik in response to disinformation and their coverage of the conflict in Ukraine. She also said that the EU would finance the purchase and delivery of military equipment to Ukraine and proposed a ban on Russian aircraft using EU airspace. The following day, the Council of the European Union adopted two assistance measures to strengthen Ukraine's military capabilities. The measures, for a total value of €500 million, financed the provision of military equipment to the Ukrainian armed forces including – for the first time in EU history – weapons and other lethal equipment.

On 28 February, the EU imposed a ban on transactions with the Russian Central Bank and a ban on the overflight of EU airspace and on access to EU airports by Russian carriers. On 2 March, a SWIFT ban for certain Russian banks was adopted, ensuring that they were disconnected from the international financial system, and the broadcasting activities in the EU of the outlets Sputnik and RT were suspended. On 10 March, additional measures targeting the Belarusian financial sector were agreed upon, and the EU imposed restrictive measures, including an asset freeze and a travel ban on 160 prominent businesspeople ("oligarchs") and members of the Russian Federation Council. At the onset of the war, similar measures had already been applied on members of Russia's Security Council and Duma, and on other individuals.

On 15 March, the EU decided to impose a fourth package of economic and individual sanctions, including trade restrictions for iron, steel, and luxury goods. The European Commission claimed that restricting steel imports could lead to a loss of €3.3 billion in revenue for Russia, and von der Leyen explained that the EU was working to suspend Russia's membership rights in multilateral institutions such as the International Monetary Fund and the World Bank. On 23 March, the Council decided to double the funding for the Ukrainian armed forces, bringing the total amount from €500 million to €1 billion. On 1 April, President of the European Parliament Roberta Metsola visited Kyiv to "show the EU's support for Ukraine" and to meet with Ukrainian officials.

On 8 April, the EU passed the fifth round of sanctions, which included an embargo on Russian coal, restrictions on Russian-flagged ships in EU ports, restrictions on Russian and Belarusian road transport in the EU, a ban on four Russian banks, export bans of high-tech goods and expanded sanctions on family members of individuals already sanctioned. The same day, a delegation including European Commission president Ursula von der Leyen, EU foreign policy chief Josep Borrell and prime minister of Slovakia Eduard Heger visited Ukraine. Von der Leyen presented Ukrainian president Volodymyr Zelenskyy with a questionnaire to join the EU; she also visited the city of Bucha to observe the aftermath of the Bucha massacre. Borrell announced that the EU delegation to Ukraine, headed by Matti Maasikas, would return to Kyiv after it was evacuated at the outbreak of war.

=== International Criminal Court ===
On 17 March 2023, International Criminal Court (ICC) judges issued an arrest warrant for Russian leader Vladimir Putin for war crimes committed during the Russian invasion of Ukraine. Among the charges includes having the taking of Ukrainian children by Russian forces. In addition to Putin, ICC also issued an arrest warrant for Russia's Presidential Commissioner for Children's Rights Maria Lvova-Belova on charges of deporting Ukrainian children to Russia.

On 25 June 2024, the ICC issued an arrest warrant for Russia's former defence minister, Sergei Shoigu, and the chief of general staff, Valery Gerasimov, on charges of alleged war crimes for missile strikes against Ukrainian energy infrastructure.

== See also ==
- Reactions to the 2021–2022 Russo-Ukrainian crisis
- 2022 boycott of Russia and Belarus
- Corporate responses to the Russian invasion of Ukraine
- List of companies that applied sanctions during the Russo-Ukrainian War
- Legality of Russian invasion of Ukraine
- Protests against the Russian invasion of Ukraine
- List of military aid to Ukraine during the Russo-Ukrainian War
- Foreign involvement in the Russian invasion of Ukraine
- International recognition of the Donetsk People's Republic and the Luhansk People's Republic
