= Vienna Document =

Series of agreements among OSCE states

The Vienna Document is a series of agreements on confidence- and security-building measures (CSBMs) related to military resources among the states of Europe. The initial agreement was established in 1990, with subsequent updates in 1992, 1994, 1999, and 2011. The most recent version, the Vienna Document 2011, was adopted by 57 participating states of the Organization for Security and Co-operation in Europe (OSCE), including the countries of Central Asia and Russia (for its territory west of the Ural Mountains). It defines its zone of application (ZOA) as encompassing "the whole of Europe, as well as the adjoining sea area and air space."

== Creation ==
The Vienna Document was first adopted in 1990 as a compilation of confidence- and security-building measures (CSBMs) derived from the 1975 Helsinki Accords and the 1986 Stockholm Document. The Vienna Document on CSBMs and the Treaty on Conventional Armed Forces in Europe (CFE) were regarded as parallel components of the peace process.

== Updates ==
=== 1990s ===
The Vienna Document was updated in 1992, 1994, 1999, and 2011.

=== 2000s ===
The Vienna Document was regarded as a low priority in the West during the 2000s. Russia's suspension of the Treaty on Conventional Armed Forces in Europe (CFE) in 2007 complicated negotiations for updating the Vienna Document.

=== 2010s ===
The 2010 adoption of Vienna Document Plus, initiated by Russia, led to the Vienna Document 2011. Four Vienna Document Plus decisions, including prior notification of sub-threshold major military activities and adjustments to the length of air base visits, were added in 2012 and 2013.

Full updates to the Vienna Document ceased following the outbreak of the 2014 Russo-Ukrainian War. However, the Vienna Document 2011 confidence-building measures remained in use during the first year of the conflict. By October 2014, 27 states had conducted 19 verification actions in Ukraine, while 11 states, including Ukraine, had conducted five verification actions in Russia. These measures were blocked in regions of Ukraine not controlled by the Ukrainian government.

During negotiations in 2016 and 2018, Western representatives sought to strengthen the Vienna Document, while Russian negotiators advocated for implementing the Vienna Document 2011 along with the subsequent Vienna Document Plus decisions.

In 2017, the OSCE described the Vienna Document, the CFE, and the Treaty on Open Skies as "a web of interlocking and mutually reinforcing arms control obligations and commitments" that "together ... enhance predictability, transparency and military stability and reduce the risk of a major conflict in Europe."

=== 2020s ===
As of late 2020, military exercises conducted by both Western and Russian forces increasingly took place as snap exercises—held near borders with little advance notice—which are not covered under the provisions of the Vienna Document 2011. Researcher Wolfgang Zellner observed that the balance between cooperation and deterrence, which had characterized relations until the early 2000s, had shifted toward a scenario of increasing mutual deterrence.

As of late 2020, Russia objected to updating the Vienna Document, arguing that a broader arms control agreement was necessary.

=== Proposed updates ===
Proposed updates to the Vienna Document around 2016 included lowering the threshold for prior notification of military activities, enhancing risk reduction measures (Chapter III), strengthening or increasing the number of inspections, introducing independent fact-finding missions, and establishing a centralized Organization for Security and Co-operation in Europe (OSCE) database on participating states' primary weapons systems.

Following the December 2020 meeting of the OSCE Ministerial Council, forty-three participating states declared their intent to "enhance reciprocal military transparency and predictability and reduc[e] risk by updating the Vienna Document."

== Structure ==
The Vienna Document 2011 consists of twelve chapters. With the exception of Chapter II, all chapters apply to military forces within the zone of application (ZOA), which is defined as the land and airspace of Europe west of the Ural Mountains, the Central Asian participating states, and the surrounding sea areas.

1. Annual exchange of military information (AEMI)
2. Defence planning
3. Risk reduction
4. Contacts
5. Prior notification of certain military activities (CMA)
6. Observation of certain military activities
7. Annual calendars
8. Constraining provisions
9. Compliance and verification
10. Regional measures
11. Annual Implementation Assessment Meeting (AIAM)
12. Final provisions

== Actions ==
The annual exchanges of military information (Chapter I in the Vienna Document 2011) take place in Vienna each December. Until 2015, when Russia completely stopped participating in the Treaty on Conventional Armed Forces in Europe (CFE), military information exchanges under both the CFE and the Vienna Document were conducted together during the December meetings in Vienna. As of the 15 February 2022 emergency Vienna Document meeting, which was called by Ukraine during the prelude to the Russian invasion of Ukraine after Russia failed to respond to Ukraine's request for details about its military buildup around Ukraine, fewer than 11 emergency Vienna Document meetings had been held.

=== 1990s and 2000s ===
From 1992 to 2012, an average of 90 inspections and 45 evaluation visits were conducted annually.

=== 2010s ===
Russia used the provisions of the document in early April 2015 to compel NATO to agree to a Russian inspection team being present at the 2015 Joint Warrior exercise off the coast of Scotland.

=== 2020s ===
On 9 April 2021, Ukraine invoked Paragraph 16.1.3 of the Vienna Document to seek an explanation regarding suspicious Russian military activities near the Ukrainian border and in Crimea, following unanswered questions posed to Russian authorities. On 10 April 2022, Ukraine formally requested a meeting with the council of the Organization for Security and Co-operation in Europe (OSCE), but Russian authorities did not attend the meeting. The US, Germany, France, and Poland missions to OSCE decried Russia's absence as "unhelpful".

In November and December 2021, during the prelude to the Russian invasion of Ukraine, Russian military officers made a Vienna Document 2011 visit to Latvia to inspect Latvian military forces. In January 2022, a pre-planned arms inspection by Latvian military officers to the Bryansk and Smolensk regions of Russia, scheduled for 24–29 January 2022, was refused by Russian authorities, who cited COVID-19 pandemic restrictions. The Latvian Ministry of Defence commented that the pandemic had not prevented the holding of the exercise. The Defence Minister, Artis Pabriks, described the Russian reason for refusal as

"a poor excuse" that "raised suspicions that Russia wanted to hide something by not disclosing the actual scope and intent of its military movements as required by [the] OSCE cooperation framework".

On 10 February 2022, Estonia, Latvia, and Lithuania invoked the Vienna Document 2011, requesting information from Belarus on "the total number of troops, battle tanks, armoured combat vehicles, artillery pieces, mortars and rocket launchers, envisaged sorties per aircraft, and rapid-reaction forces" involved in the planned Union Resolve 2022 military exercise for Russian forces in Belarus, scheduled for 10–20 February 2022. The Russian ambassador to Belarus, Boris Gryzlov, stated in a television interview that the forces involved were below the notification limit, and "therefore there is nothing to worry about". The Belarusian official response indicated that the exercise size was under the reporting threshold. Estonian officials described the Belarusian response as "insufficient" and interpreted it as showing "no interest in transparency and confidence-building".

On 11 February 2022, Ukraine invoked Chapter III of the Vienna Document, risk reduction, requesting Russia to provide "detailed explanations on military activities in the areas adjacent to the territory of Ukraine and in the temporarily occupied Crimea." Russia did not respond within the required 48-hour deadline. On 13 February, Ukraine requested an emergency OSCE meeting within 48 hours for Russia to provide a response. On 14 February, the Ukrainian Defence Minister Oleksii Reznikov and the Belarusian Defence Minister Viktor Khrenin agreed on confidence-building and transparency measures for risk reduction. The plan included visits by Reznikov to the Russian–Belarusian Allied Resolve 2022 military exercise and by Khrenin to the Ukrainian Zametil 2022 military exercise. Reznikov described the agreement as a positive signal. On 15 February, the Vienna Document emergency meeting was held for OSCE participant states, as requested by Ukraine. The Russian OSCE representative was absent from the meeting. The US ambassador to the OSCE, Michael R. Carpenter, described the Russian absence as "unfortunate and regrettable".

== Similar agreements ==
While the Vienna Document 2011 is limited to forces in Europe and Central Asia, the Global Exchange of Military Information applies to all forces of the participating states, regardless of their location.
