= SSD (disambiguation) =

SSD, or solid-state drive, is a type of data storage device that uses semiconductor memory rather than magnetic media.

SSD or ssd may also refer to:

== Science and technology ==
- Saturated-surface-dry, aggregate or porous solid condition
- Singular spectrum decomposition, a method of decomposing nonlinear and non-stationary time series as a form of singular spectrum analysis

=== Biology and medicine ===
- Schizophrenia spectrum disorders
- Signal-sensing domain, in molecular biology
- Sterol-sensing domain, a protein domain
- Speech sound disorder
- Sexual size dimorphism
- Single-sided deafness
- Somatic symptom disorder
- A brand name for silver sulfadiazine antibacterial

=== Computing ===
- Server-side decoration of windows, an alternative to client-side decoration
- Single-shot multibox detection, computer vision object detection
- System sequence diagram in software engineering

=== Mathematics ===
- Schwartz sequential dropping, an electoral system

== Other uses ==
- Sardar Sarovar Dam, Gujarat, India
- Scalextric Sport Digital, toy cars
- Singapore School for the Deaf
- Siroi language, an ISO 639-3 code
- Sisters School District, Oregon, United States
- Social Security Disability Insurance (SSD or SSDI), United States
- South Sudan (ISO 3166-1 alpha-3 code: SSD)
- Special School District of St. Louis County, Missouri, United States
- SSD (band), Boston, United States, 1981–1985
- Stansted Airport railway station, England (National Rail code: SSD)
- State Security Department, North Korean secret police
- United States–Russia Strategic Stability Dialogue, meetings to reduce the risk of United States–Russia nuclear war
