= Blizzard of 2022 =

Blizzard of 2022 may refer to:

- January 2022 North American blizzard
- Late December 2022 North American winter storm

== See also ==
- Blizzard 2022, or Zametil 2022, a Ukrainian military exercise
