= Confidence-building measures in South America =

Confidence-building measures

The South American experience with confidence-building measures has been markedly different from the Central American one for the obvious reason that South America did not live through the protracted conflict and peacemaking process which dominated Central America in the 1980s and early 1990s. Thus, there was no UN peace-keeping presence in South America, and there was no overarching treaty or Contadora/ Esquipulas Treaty framework in which to ground specific CBMs.

Nevertheless, CBMs have been of considerable significance in South America in this period, especially when linked to schemes for economic and political integration. The explicit use of CBMs in this connection may well turn out to have as significant long-term effects as in Central America. Of particular interest is the notion that CBMs and shifts in strategic geopolitical thinking can change the role of the military and assist in strengthening the democratic process.

The most dramatic shifts have occurred in the Argentine-Brazilian relationship, which has the potential of driving most of the other political, strategic and economic arrangements in southern South America. However, there are other equally significant changes, such as in the Argentine-Chilean and even the Argentine-British relationship which have been positively affected by CBMs in the past decade.

Put in other words, CBMs can assist in shifting the strategic paradigm from one based on hostility and conflict-laden geopolitics to one which stresses "geo-economics" and the geopolitics of cooperation and integration with neighbors.

== The conflict possibilities ==
Although often ignored outside of the region, South America has a series of historic strains between pairs of bordering states which have always had the potential of flaring up and reaching the conflict stage. Because the military establishments of many of the South American nations have considerably greater potential than the Central American ones, any inter-state armed conflict would be far more damaging than in Central America (the example of the 1982 Anglo-Argentina war over the Falklands/Malvinas is illustrative).

Furthermore, the military establishments of the nations involved have a vested interest in using these possible conflicts as justifications for their budgets, troop levels, and influence. Their use of classical "war hypotheses" based on geopolitical thinking and historic animosities with neighbors is an enduring feature which has shaped military roles and missions. Thus, CBMs can have considerable potential if they serve to reduce these animosities, diminish the credibility of the "war hypotheses", and make the possibilities of conflict less likely.

A short list of potential bilateral conflict situations would include: Guyana-Venezuela; Venezuela-Colombia; Ecuador-Peru; Peru-Chile; Bolivia-Chile; Chile-Argentina; Argentina-Brazil; Argentina-United Kingdom. Conflicts which are multilateral would include Argentine-Brazilian competition for influence in the South American "buffer states" (Uruguay, Paraguay, Bolivia); attempts to exercise control over extensive economic or patrimonial maritime zones (such as the Chilean effort to claim a "mar presencial"); and issues of sovereignty and resources in the quadrant of Antarctica which is associated with South America, and which is claimed by Argentina, Chile and Great Britain, despite the presence of scientific bases of some 18 nations, including the U. S.

== Impact of CBMs ==
It is against this backdrop of potential conflict situations that the significance of CBMs in South America must be examined. Although some of these CBMs have been in place for many years, there was a dramatic increase in their number in the last twenty years, and for the first time the language of CBMs was specifically used in connection with international strains in South America.

Although it is difficult to document linkages and causality, it appears that the increased use of CBMs in the Central American conflict scenario, and the involvement of several South American nations in the Contadora and Esquipulas effort, produced a "contagion effect" under which CBMs concepts and techniques were transferred from the Central to the South American conflict scenarios.

CBMs have had the greatest impact on the so-called "ABC" countries of the Southern Cone (Argentina, Brazil and Chile), and have been linked to attempts at economic integration in the same area (Mercosur); there have also been proposals for a collective security agreement which would unify the Mercosur countries.

=== Argentina-Brazil ===
Within the over-all shift from competition to cooperation between these two major forces in South America, there is a strategic component that is remarkable in light of the fact that the contingency planning of these two nations always included the "war hypothesis" of armed conflict between them.

One basic CBM has been the periodic meetings of senior representatives of their General Staffs to discuss matters of common interest and plan for specific measures of military-to-military cooperation such as exchanges of information and joint arms manufacturing. These meetings stemmed from the 1985 Iguazú Declaration, and began as bilateral meetings.

Since then they have included Paraguay, Uruguay and Chile as observers, with plans for including these countries as full members. The meetings are now being called a "strategic Mercosur" to parallel the economic Mercosur. Two of the old areas of dangerous competition, nuclear projects and strains over dams along their riverine borders (sometimes called the "A-Bomb" of atomic rivalry and the "H-Bomb" of incompatible hydroelectric projects) have been basically resolved by means of cooperative approaches in these two potentially conflictive issue-areas between Argentina and Brazil.

The degree to which CBM terminology has crept into the resolution of these old problems can be seen in the words of Argentine President Carlos Menem when he signed a decree prohibiting the export of Argentine nuclear and ballistic missile technology to nations which refuse to accept international safeguards: "A lack of transparency (in the past) made us dangerous and untrustworthy". Followers of CBM trends would immediately recognize the significance and origin of the term "transparency" in Menem's words.

=== Argentina-Chile ===
The improvement in relations between these two countries is equally remarkable, given their historic rivalry and the fact that they almost went to war in 1978 over the issue of the Beagle Channel Islands in their far southern frontier. Resolution of that issue by means of Papal mediation paved the way for a series of other measures, many of them clearly CBMs between their military establishments.

As examples we can cite periodic meetings of the senior naval regional commanders in Puerto Williams, Chile and Ushuaia, Argentina (both sites are on the Beagle Channel). Likewise, southern air force commanders of Chile and Argentine have "hot lines", and meet periodically to minimize the danger that border incidents might lead to something more serious. High-level discussions between Presidents Menem and Aylwin over remaining border issues were accompanied by lower-level military contacts and exchange of visits aimed at enhancing CBMs.

=== Argentina-United Kingdom ===
CBMs in this area are of special interest because of the legacy of the 1982 war, which might have been averted had confidence-building measures existed then. Some of the CBMs established by the two countries are clearly inspired by CBMs which had been set up between NATO and the Warsaw Pact.

Other CBMs may have stemmed from the Central American peace process, in which Argentina played a significant role as part of the Contadora Support Group as well as participation in the United Nations Observer Group ONUCA (with both observers and a group of naval patrol vessels in the Gulf of Fonseca). The Anglo-Argentine CBMs are contained in a series of joint declarations signed in 1989, 1990 and 1991, and include classic CBMs such as the establishment of direct communication links, exchanges of information, search and rescue procedures, notification of military movements and maneuvers above certain specified levels, and the establishment of certain "rules of behavior".
