= Prelude to the 2022 Russian invasion of Ukraine =

Period of escalating tension between Russia and Ukraine

- Part of the Russo-Ukrainian war
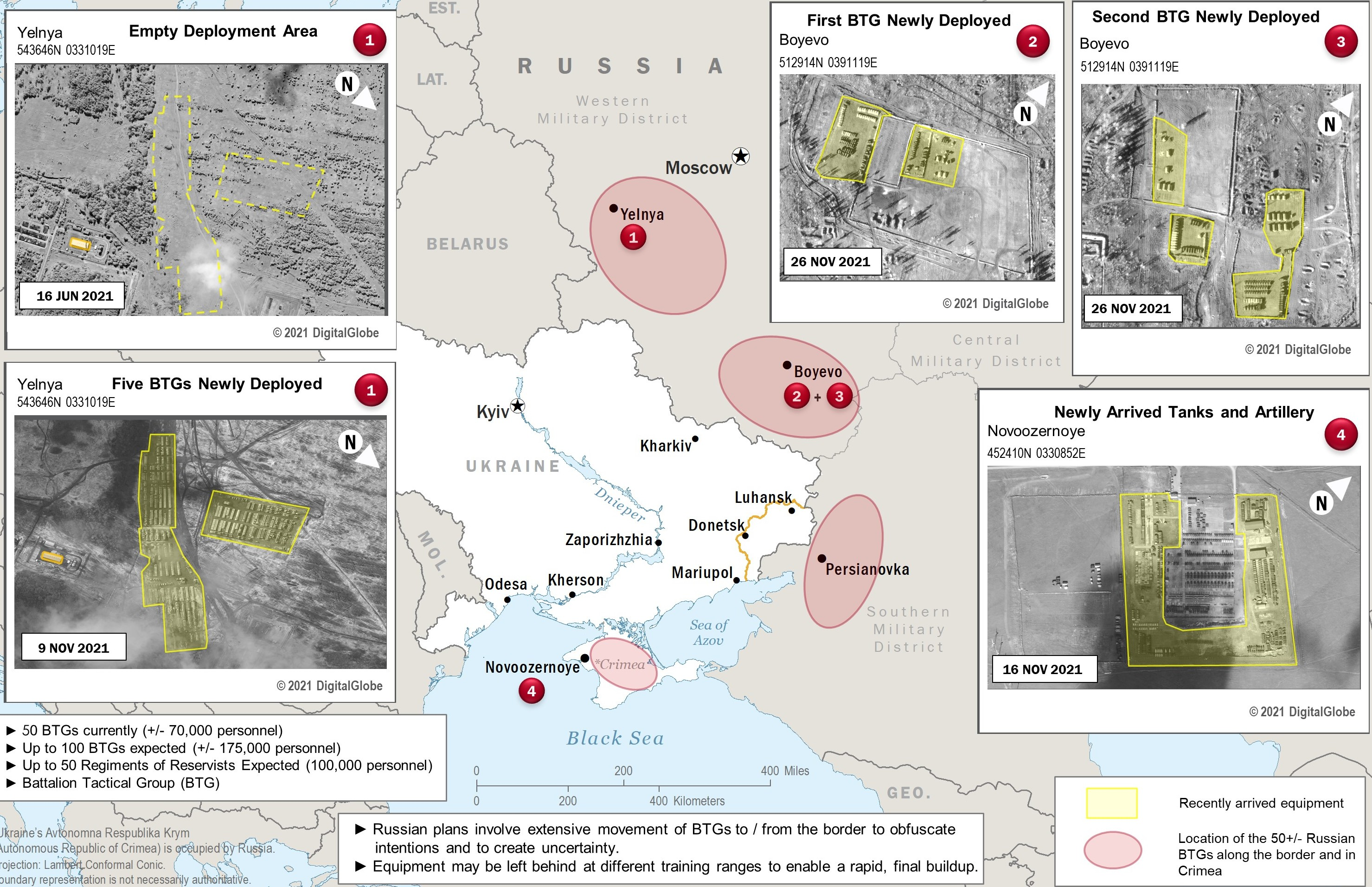
- Russian military build-up around Ukraine as of 3 December 2021
| Date | Initial: 3 March – 30 April 2021 (1 month, 3 weeks and 6 days); Renewed: 26 October 2021 – 24 February 2022 (3 months, 4 weeks and 1 day) |
| Location | Ukraine, Russia, Belarus |
| Result | Escalation of the Russo-Ukrainian war: Russian forces openly cross the Ukrainian border into territory occupied by Russian-controlled separatists on 21 February 2022.; Russia launches a full-scale invasion of Ukraine on 24 February 2022 |

Parties involved in the crisis
| Russia; Donetsk PR (Note: The Donetsk People's Republic and the Luhansk People's Republic, which were Russian-controlled puppet states, declared their independence from Ukraine in May 2014. Amid the full-scale invasion of Ukraine, Russia formally announced the annexation of both entities on September 30, 2022.); Luhansk PR; Belarus | Ukraine; Arms suppliers: Canada (Note: Canada sent ammunition, light weapons, and other military equipment as well as military instructors; overall, Canada committed $7.8m in lethal aid and $620m in financial loans and non-lethal military aid.); Czech Republic (Note: The Czech Republic sold armored cars and donated artillery shells.); Estonia (Note: Estonia sent a field hospital (together with Germany) and weapons (specifically FGM-148 Javelin anti-tank missiles).); Latvia (Note: Latvia delivered FIM-92 Stinger air-defense systems); Lithuania (Note: Lithuania sent ammunition, weapons (including FIM-92 Stinger air-defense systems) and instructors.); Netherlands (Note: The Netherlands will supply Ukraine with sniper rifles, ammunition, combat helmets, flak jackets, and radars.); Poland (Note: Poland sold armoured personnel carriers, ammunition and sent instructors); Turkey (Note: Turkey sold combat drones (specifically Bayraktar TB2s).); United Kingdom (Note: The United Kingdom sent ammunition, weapons (specifically NLAW anti-tank guided missiles), and instructors.); United States (Note: The United States sent financial aid, ammunition, weapons, and instructors.); Non-lethal military aid: Germany (Note: Germany sent a field hospital (together with Estonia).); Italy (Note: Italy sent demining equipment.); Sweden (Note: Sweden sent instructors.); European Union (Note: Following a request under the EU Civil Protection Mechanism, the EU sent medical supplies, field hospitals, generators, and CBRN equipment.); Belarusian opposition (Note: Belarusian opposition members assisted through cyberwarfare.) |

Commanders and leaders
| Vladimir Putin; Sergey Lavrov; Sergey Shoigu; Valery Gerasimov; Alexander Lukashenko; Viktor Khrenin; Denis Pushilin; Leonid Pasechnik | Volodymyr Zelenskyy; Dmytro Kuleba; Oleksii Reznikov; Ruslan Khomchak |

Strength
| Russia: 900,000 (Armed Forces); 554,000 (Paramilitary); 2,000,000 (Reserves); • including 175,000 to 190,000 at the Ukrainian border; Belarus: 45,350 (Armed Forces); 110,000 (Paramilitary); 289,500 (Reserves); Donetsk PR: 20,000; Luhansk PR: 14,000 | Ukraine: 209,000 (Armed Forces); 102,000 (Paramilitary); 900,000 (Reserves); Training mission: Canada: 260 (Operation Unifier) (until 13 February 2022); United States: 165 (JMTG-U) (until 12 February 2022); United Kingdom: 53 (Operation Orbital) (until 12 February 2022); Poland: 40 (JMTG-U); Lithuania: 26 (JMTG-U); Sweden: 4 (Operation Unifier) (until 13 February 2022) |

In March and April 2021, before the 2022 Russian invasion of Ukraine, the Russian Armed Forces began massing thousands of personnel and military equipment near Russia's border with Ukraine and in Crimea, representing the largest mobilisation since the illegal annexation of Crimea in 2014. This precipitated an international crisis due to concerns over a potential invasion. Satellite imagery showed movements of armour, missiles, and heavy weaponry towards the border. The troops were partially withdrawn by June 2021, though the infrastructure was left in place. A second build-up began in October 2021, this time with more soldiers and with deployments on new fronts; by December over 100,000 Russian troops were massed around Ukraine on three sides, including Belarus from the north and Crimea from the south. Despite the Russian military build-ups, Russian officials from November 2021 to 20 February 2022 repeatedly denied that Russia had plans to invade Ukraine.

The crisis was related to the war in Donbas, itself part of the Russo-Ukrainian war, ongoing since February 2014. Intercepted phone conversations of Sergey Glazyev, a top advisor to Russian president Vladimir Putin, disclosed the specifics of the project Novorossiya to take over not just Crimea, but also the Donbas, Kharkiv, Odesa, and Zaporizhzhia regions of Ukraine, which Russia apparently aimed to annex following Crimea. The plan involved fomenting widespread unrest using pro-Russian agents on the ground, and then orchestrating uprisings that would announce rigged referendums about joining Russia, similar to the one that took place in Crimea on 16 March 2014. In December 2021, Russia advanced two draft treaties that contained requests for what it referred to as "security guarantees", including a legally binding promise that Ukraine would not join the North Atlantic Treaty Organization (NATO) and a reduction in NATO troops and materiel stationed in Eastern Europe, threatening unspecified military response if those demands were not met in full. NATO rejected these requests, and the United States warned Russia of "swift and severe" economic sanctions should it further invade Ukraine. The crisis was described by many commentators as one of the most intense in Europe since the Cold War.

On 21 February 2022, Russia officially recognised the two breakaway regions in eastern Ukraine, the Donetsk People's Republic and the Luhansk People's Republic, as independent states, and deployed troops to Donbas, in a move interpreted as Russia's effective withdrawal from the Minsk Protocol. The breakaway republics were recognised in the boundaries of their respective Ukrainian oblasts, although much of this territory was still held by Ukrainian government forces. On 22 February, Putin declared the Minsk agreements as invalid and the Federation Council unanimously authorised him to use military force in the territories. On the morning of 24 February, Putin announced that Russia was initiating a "special military operation" in the Donbas, and launched a full-scale invasion into Ukraine.

== Background ==
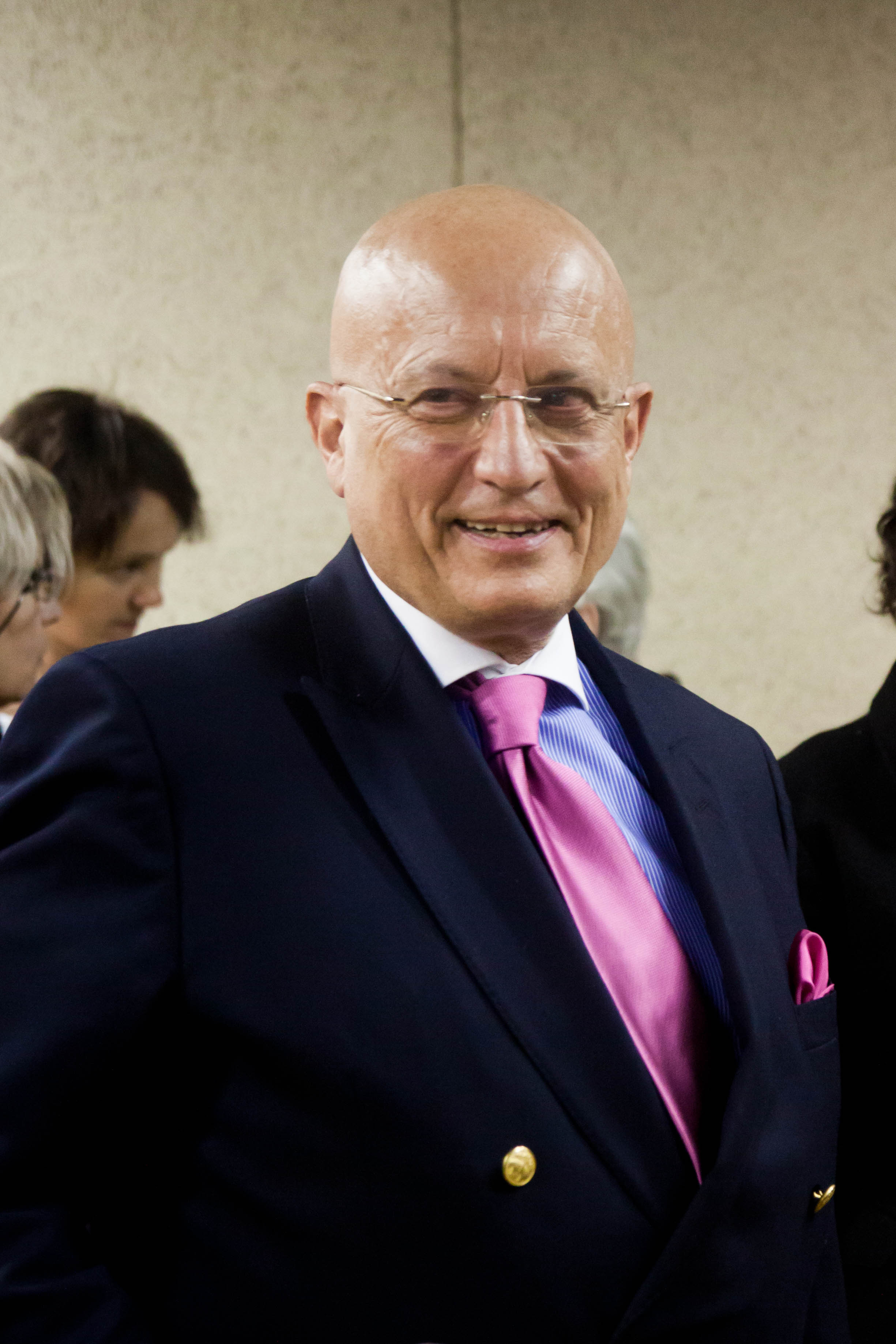
Sergey Karaganov, who is considered close to Putin, formulated many of the core ideas that led to Russia's invasion of Ukraine.

Following the dissolution of the Soviet Union in 1991, Ukraine and Russia continued to retain close ties. Despite being a founding state of the CIS, Ukraine never signed the CIS Charter, therefore never becoming a formal member of the CIS.

In 1994, Ukraine, Russia, the UK and the US signed the Budapest Memorandum on Security Assurances, agreeing to abandon its nuclear arsenal in exchange for assurances from Russia, the United Kingdom, and the United States against threats or the use of force towards the territorial integrity or political independence of Ukraine. Five years later, Russia became a signatory of the Charter for European Security, where it "reaffirmed the inherent right of each and every participating State to be free to choose or change its security arrangements, including treaties of alliance, as they evolve".

Despite being recognised as an independent country since 1991, Ukraine continued to be perceived by Russian leadership as part of its sphere of influence due to its status as a former USSR constituent republic. In 2008, Russian president Vladimir Putin spoke out against Ukraine's membership in NATO. In 2009, Romanian analyst Iulian Chifu and his co-authors opined that in regard to Ukraine, Russia has pursued an updated version of the Brezhnev Doctrine, which dictates that the sovereignty of Ukraine cannot be larger than that of the Warsaw Pact's member states before the collapse of the Soviet sphere of influence during the late 1980s and early 1990s. In Putin's view, Russia's actions to placate the West in the early 1990s should have been met with reciprocity from the West, thus without NATO expansion along Russia's border.

Following months of Euromaidan protests, on 21 February 2014, pro-Russian Ukrainian president Viktor Yanukovych and parliamentary opposition leaders signed an agreement calling for an early election. The following day, Yanukovych fled Kyiv ahead of an impeachment vote that stripped him of his presidential authority. Leaders of the Russian-speaking eastern regions of Ukraine declared continued loyalty to Yanukovych, causing the 2014 pro-Russian unrest in the country. This unrest was fomented by Russia as part of a coordinated political and military campaign against Ukraine. This was followed by Russia's invasion and subsequent annexation of Crimea in March 2014 and the beginning of the Donbas war in April, with the creation of the Russia-backed quasi-states of the Donetsk and Luhansk People's Republics. The Minsk agreements allowed the fighting to subside in Donbas, leaving separatists in control of about a third of the region. This stalemate led to the war being labelled a "frozen conflict".

Beginning in 2019, Russia issued over 650,000 internal Russian passports to Donbas residents, which the Ukrainian government viewed as a step towards the annexation of the region. On 14 September 2020, Ukrainian president Volodymyr Zelenskyy approved a new national security strategy for the country, signaling Ukraine's intent to foster a stronger relationship with NATO "with the aim of membership in [the group]." On 24 March 2021, Zelenskyy signed Decree No. 117/2021 approving the government's strategy for the "de-occupation and reintegration" of Crimea, including Sevastapol. The decree complemented the activities of the already existing Crimean Platform while also mentioning other means for regaining control of the region, including through potential military force. The next day, Zelenskyy enacted the National Security and Defence Council's decision on Ukraine's military security strategy, protecting the country from external threats through deterrence, internal stability in times of crisis, and cooperation, particularly with the EU and NATO. The decree additionally described Russia as a "military adversary" which "carries out armed aggression against Ukraine... [and] uses military, political, economic, informational and psychological, space, cyber and other means that threaten [the] independence, state sovereignty and territorial integrity" of the country.

In Russia, Putin's close adviser Nikolai Patrushev was a leading figure in updating the country's national security strategy, published in May 2021. It states that Russia may use "forceful methods" to "thwart or avert unfriendly actions that threaten the sovereignty and territorial integrity of the Russian Federation." Russia has said that a possible Ukrainian accession to NATO and NATO enlargement in general threaten its national security. In turn, Ukraine and other European countries neighboring Russia have accused Putin of attempting to restore the Russian Empire/Soviet Union and of pursuing aggressive militaristic policies.

Shortly after the annexation of Crimea in 2014, Ukraine blocked the flow of the North Crimean Canal, which had supplied 85 percent of Crimea's water. Crimea's reservoirs were subsequently depleted and water shortages ensued; water was reportedly only being available for three to five hours a day in 2021. The New York Times cited senior American officials mentioning that securing Crimea's water supply could be an objective of a Russian invasion.

In July 2021, Putin published an essay titled On the Historical Unity of Russians and Ukrainians, in which he re-affirmed his view that Russians and Ukrainians were "one people". In response, American historian Timothy Snyder characterised Putin's ideas as imperialism while British journalist Edward Lucas described it as historical revisionism. Other observers have noted that the Russian leadership has a distorted view of modern Ukraine and its history. Some historians, including James Ellison and Michael Cox, contend that Putin became convinced by his government's active measures and ultimately believed Russian propaganda campaigns and false allegations of genocide in Donbas.

CSTO member states in 2022 NATO member states in 2022 States affected by territorial conflicts with the involvement of Russia (Georgia, Japan, Moldova and Ukraine) Disputed regions claimed by Russia as either part of its territory (Crimea and Kuril Islands) or sovereign states (Abkhazia and South Ossetia), or separatist regions backed by Russia (Donetsk, Luhansk, and Transnistria)

== Initial tensions (March–April 2021) ==
=== First Russian military buildup ===
On 21 February 2021, the Russian Defence Ministry announced the deployment of 3,000 paratroopers to the border for "large-scale exercises". The announcement was preceded by President Zelenskyy's decision on 2 February to implement recommendations from the country's National Security and Defence Council, which were intended to crackdown on Russian propaganda in Ukraine. Amongst the measures enacted by Zelenskyy were sanctions on Opposition Platform — For Life party People's Deputies Viktor Medvedchuk and Taras Kozak, and a national ban on multiple pro-Russian television channels, including 112 Ukraine, NewsOne, and ZIK. Medvedchuk, who also had alleged links to the banned media outlets, was a leading pro-Russian Ukrainian opposition politician and tycoon with close personal ties to Vladimir Putin. An analysis by Time published in February 2022 cited the event as the start of the Russian military buildup near Ukraine. According to an April 2023 investigative report by the Russian website Vertska, the banning of Medvedchuk's channels was the final catalyst for Putin deciding to take military action against Ukraine. The report further claimed that he made the decision in near-total secrecy between February and March 2021, with Russian businessman and close friend Yury Kovalchuk one of the very few people aware of Putin's plans at the time; the anti-Western Kovalchuk supposedly convinced Putin that he should act whilst Europe remained distracted by internal political divisions.

On 3 March, Suspilne claimed separatists from the self-proclaimed Donetsk People's Republic (DPR) reported they had been granted permission to use "preemptive fire for destruction" on Ukrainian military positions. On 16 March, a State Border Guard Service of Ukraine (SBGS) border patrol in Sumy spotted a Russian Mil Mi-8 helicopter coming approximately 50 metres (160 ft) into Ukrainian territory before heading back into Russian airspace. Ten days later, Russian troops fired mortars at Ukrainian positions near the village of Shumy in the Donbas, killing four Ukrainian servicemen. Russia refused to renew the ceasefire in Donbas on 1 April.

Beginning from 16 March, NATO started a series of military exercises known as Defender-Europe 2021. (Note: DEFENDER Europe 21 was a large-scale U.S. Army-led, multinational, joint exercise designed to build readiness and interoperability between U.S., NATO and partner militaries. DEFENDER Europe 21 included a greater number of NATO allies and partner nations conducting activities over a wider area than what was planned for in 2020, which was severely restricted due to the COVID-19 pandemic. More than 28,000 multinational forces from 26 nations conducted near-simultaneous operations across more than 30 training areas in a dozen countries. DEFENDER Europe 21 also included significant involvement of the U.S. Air Force and the U.S. Navy. The exercise utilized key ground and maritime routes bridging Europe, Asia, and Africa. The exercise incorporated new or high-end capabilities including air and missile defense assets, as well as assets from the U.S. Army Security Force Assistance Brigades and the recently reactivated V Corps. Defender Europe 21 was one of the largest U.S.-Army, NATO-led military exercises in Europe in decades. The exercise began in mid-March and lasted until June 2021. It included "nearly simultaneous operations across more than 30 training areas" in Estonia, Bulgaria, Romania, Kosovo and other countries. Gen. Christopher G. Cavoli, commanding general of the United States Army Europe and Africa, said that "While we are closely monitoring the COVID situation, we've proven we have the capability to train safely despite the pandemic." Russian Defense Minister Sergey Shoigu said that Russia had deployed troops to its western borders for "combat training exercises" in response to NATO's "military activities that threaten Russia.") The military exercise, one of the largest NATO-led military exercises held in Europe in decades, included near-simultaneous operations across over 30 training areas in 12 countries, involving 28,000 troops from 27 nations. Russia criticised NATO for holding Defender Europe 2021, and deployed troops to its western borders for military exercises in response to NATO's military activities. The deployment led to Russia having a sizable troop buildup along the Russo-Ukrainian border by mid-April. A Ukrainian estimate placed the deployment at approximately 40,000 Russian forces in occupied Crimea and the eastern portion of the Russo-Ukrainian border. The German government subsequently condemned the deployment as an act of provocation.

Nearly a week later on 30 March, Ukrainian Commander-in-Chief Colonel General Ruslan Khomchak revealed intelligence reports suggesting a military buildup by Russia close to Ukraine in preparations for the Zapad Exercises. The buildup consisted of 28 Russian battalion tactical groups (BTGs) situated primarily along the Russo-Ukrainian border in Rostov, Bryansk, and Voronezh Oblasts, as well as Russian-occupied Crimea, and was ultimately expected to increase to 53 BTGs. It was estimated that over 60,000 Russian troops were stationed in Crimea and Donbas, with 2,000 military advisors and instructors in separatist-controlled Donbas alone. Putin's spokesman Dmitry Peskov claimed the military movements "[were] not of any concern" for neighbouring countries, and that the decisions for deployment were made to address matters of Russia's "national security".

Between late March and early April 2021, significant quantities of weapons and equipment from various regions of Russia, including the far-eastern parts of Siberia, were transported towards the Russo-Ukrainian border and into Crimea. Unofficial Russian sources, such as the pro-Russian Telegram channel Military Observer, published a video depicting the flight of a group of Russian Kamov Ka-52 and Mil Mi-28 attack helicopters. It was emphasized by the original sources that the flight had allegedly taken place on the Russo-Ukrainian border.

=== Continued violence and escalation ===
Russian president Vladimir Putin (left), and Ukrainian president Volodymyr Zelenskyy (right)

Russian and pro-Kremlin media alleged on 3 April 2021 that a Ukrainian drone attack had caused the death of a child in separatist-controlled Donbas; however, no further details were given surrounding the incident. Vyacheslav Volodin, speaker of the Russian State Duma, believed that Ukrainian leaders should be "held responsible for the death", while proposing to exclude Ukraine from the Council of Europe. On 5 April, Ukrainian representatives of the Joint Centre of Control and Coordination (JCCC) sent a note to the OSCE Special Monitoring Mission in Ukraine regarding pro-Russian intentions to falsify the accusations. The next day, the mission confirmed the death of a child in Russian-occupied Donbas but failed to establish a link between the purported "Ukrainian drone strike" and the child's death. On 6 April 2021, two Ukrainian servicemen were killed in Donetsk Oblast: one by shelling at a Ukrainian army position near the town of Nevelske and another near the village of Stepne by an unknown explosive device. Following the deaths, Zelenskyy declared that Ukraine would not respond to "provocations" by separatists forces. Due to the shelling, the water pumping station in the "gray-zone" between the villages of Vasylivka and Kruta Balka in South Donbas was de-energized, cutting off the water supply to over 50 settlements.

Russia moved ships between the Caspian Sea and Black Sea, with the transfer including several landing craft and artillery boats. Interfax reported on 8 April that the crews and ships of the Caspian Flotilla would perform the final naval exercises in cooperation with the Black Sea Fleet. On 10 April 2021, Ukraine invoked Paragraph 16 of the Vienna Document and initiated a meeting in the OSCE on the surge of Russian troops near the Russo-Ukrainian border and Russian-occupied Crimea. Ukraine's initiative was supported by several countries but the Russian delegation failed to appear at the meeting and refused to provide explanations. On 13 April 2021, Ukrainian consul Oleksandr Sosoniuk was detained in Saint Petersburg and later expelled by the FSB for allegedly "receiving confidential information" during a meeting with a Russian citizen. In response, on 19 April, Yevhen Chernikov, a senior Russian diplomat of the Russian embassy in Kyiv, was declared by Ukraine a persona non grata and ordered to leave the country within 72 hours. On 14 April 2021, in a meeting in Crimea, Nikolai Patrushev, Secretary of the Security Council of Russia accused Ukrainian special services of trying to organise "terrorist attacks and sabotage" on the peninsula.

On the night of 14 to 15 April 2021, a naval confrontation took place in the Sea of Azov, 40 kilometres (25 mi) from the Kerch Strait, between three Ukrainian Gyurza-M-class artillery boats and six vessels from the Coast Guard of the Border Service of the FSB. The Ukrainian artillery boats were escorting civilian ships when the incident occurred. It was reported that Ukrainian ships threatened to use airborne weapons to deter provocations from FSB vessels. The incident ended without any casualties. The following day, Russia announced the closure of parts of the Black Sea to warships and vessels of other countries until October, under the pretext of military exercises. The Ukrainian Ministry of Foreign Affairs condemned the decision as a "gross violation of the right of navigational freedoms" guaranteed by the UN Convention on the Law of the Sea. According to the convention, Russia must not "obstruct maritime passages of the International strait to ports" in the Sea of Azov. According to John Kirby, Pentagon Press Secretary, Russia had concentrated more troops near the Russo-Ukrainian border than in 2014. Additionally, temporary restrictions by Russia on flights over parts of Crimea and the Black Sea were reportedly imposed from 20 to 24 April 2021.

=== Partial withdrawal ===
On 22 April 2021, Russian Minister of Defence Sergei Shoigu announced a drawdown of military exercises with troops from the 58th and 41st Army, and the 7th, 76th, and 98th Guards Airborne Division returning to their permanent bases by 1 May after inspections in the Southern and Western military districts. Equipment at the Pogonovo training facility was to remain for the annual military exercise with Belarus scheduled for September 2021.

Senior U.S. Defense Department officials reported on 5 May 2021 that Russia had only withdrawn a few thousand troops since the previous military buildup. Despite the withdrawal of several Russian units, vehicles and equipment were left in place, leading to fears that a re-deployment might occur. The officials estimated over 80,000 Russian troops still remained at the Russo-Ukrainian border by early May. Members of the U.S. intelligence community began discussing the serious potential for a Russian invasion during the spring and fall of 2021, noting the massive continued deployment of military assets and logistics far beyond those used for standard exercises.

== Renewed tensions (October 2021–February 2022) ==
On 2 September 2021, Russia refused to extend the mandate of the OSCE mission at the "Gukovo" and "Donetsk" border checkpoints past 30 September.

On 11 October 2021, Dmitry Medvedev, Deputy Chairman of the Security Council of Russia, published an article in Kommersant in which he argued that Ukraine was a "vassal" of the West and that, therefore, it was pointless for Russia to attempt to hold a dialogue with the Ukrainian authorities, whom he described as "weak", "ignorant" and "unreliable". Medvedev concluded that Russia should do nothing in regard to Ukraine and wait until a Ukrainian government comes to power that is genuinely interested in improving relations with Russia, adding "Russia knows how to wait. We are patient people." The Kremlin later specified that Medvedev's article "runs in unison" with Russia's view of the current Ukrainian government.

In November 2021, the Russian Defence Ministry described the deployment of U.S. warships to the Black Sea as a "threat to regional security and strategic stability." The ministry said in a statement, "The real goal behind the U.S. activities in the Black Sea region is exploring the theater of operations in case Kyiv attempts to settle the conflict in the southeast by force."

=== Second Russian military buildup ===
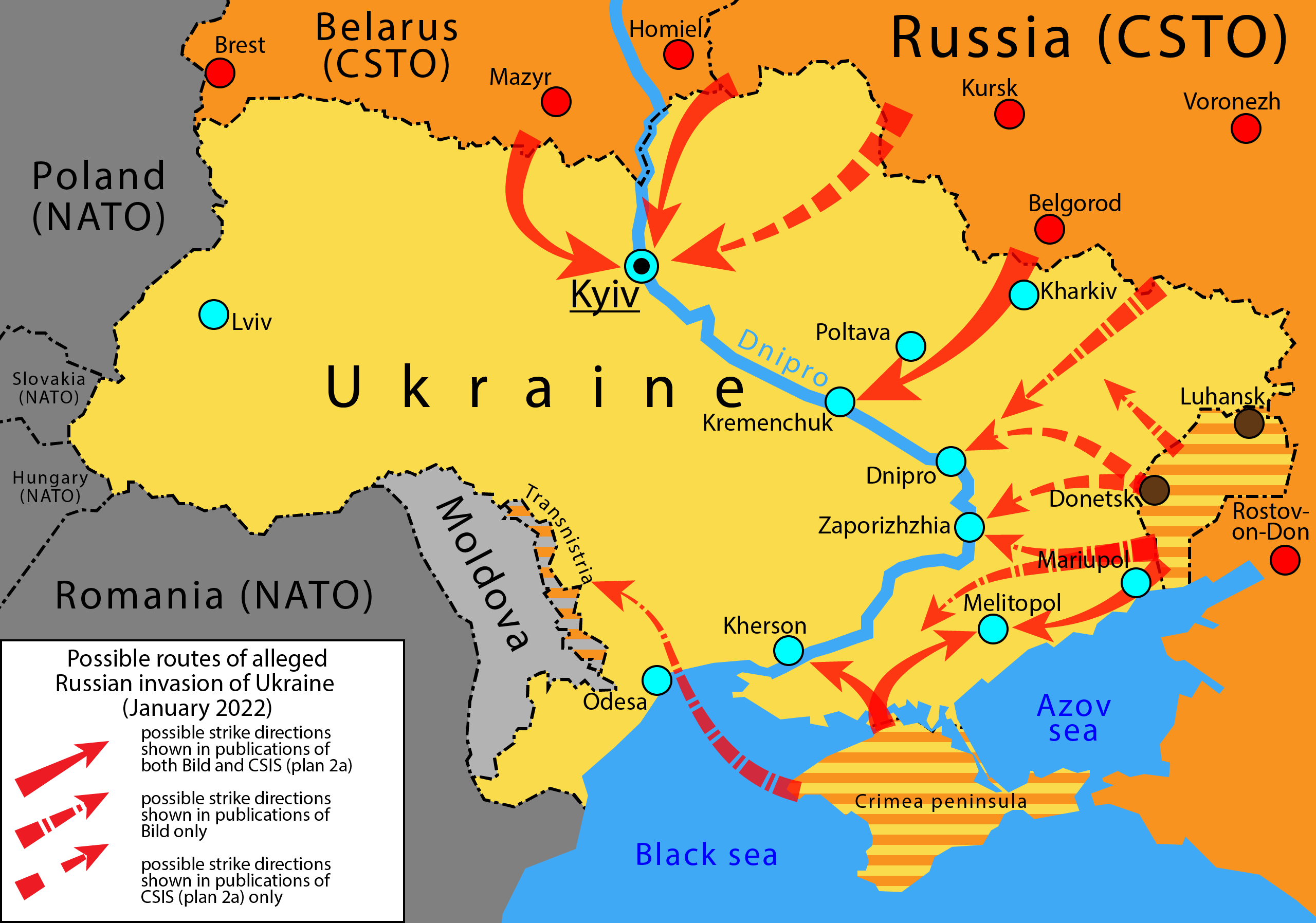
A map showing two alleged Russian plans published separately by Bild and the Center for Strategic and International Studies (CSIS)

==== November 2021–December 2021 ====
In early November 2021, reports of Russian military buildups prompted American officials to warn their European allies that Russia could be considering a potential invasion of Ukraine, while a number of experts and commentators believed that Putin was seeking a stronger hand for further negotiations with the West. Ukrainian military intelligence (HUR MO) estimated that the figure had risen to 90,000 by 2 November, including forces from the 8th and 20th Guards, and the 4th and 6th Air and Air Defence Forces Army.

On 13 November 2021, Ukrainian president Volodymyr Zelenskyy announced that Russia had again amassed 100,000 troops near the Russo-Ukrainian border, higher than an American assessment of approximately 70,000. On the same day, in an interview on Russia-1, Putin denied any possibility of a Russian invasion of Ukraine, labelling the notions as "alarmist", while simultaneously accusing NATO of undergoing unscheduled naval drills at the Black Sea. The Russian troops had been told that it was just an exercise. Eight days later, the chief of the HUR MOU, Kyrylo Budanov, said that Russian troop deployment had approached 92,000. Budanov accused Russia of fomenting several protests against COVID-19 vaccination in Kyiv to destabilise the country.

Between late-November and early-December 2021, as Russian and Ukrainian officials traded accusations of massive troop deployments in Donbas, Ukrainian Minister of Foreign Affairs Dmytro Kuleba on 25 November admonished Russia against a "new attack on Ukraine", which he said "would cost [Russia] dear", while Kremlin spokesman Dmitry Peskov on 21 November called the accusations "[the] hysteria" that "[wa]s being intentionally whipped up" and said that, in their opinion, it was Ukraine who was planning aggressive actions against Donbas.

On 3 December 2021 Ukrainian Minister of Defence Oleksii Reznikov, spoke of the possibility of a "large-scale escalation" by Russia during the end of January 2022, during a session at the country's national parliament, the Verkhovna Rada. Reznikov estimated that the Russian military buildup consisted of 94,300 troops. In early December 2021, an analysis conducted by Janes concluded that major elements of the Russian 41st Army (headquartered at Novosibirsk) and the 1st Guards Tank Army (normally deployed around Moscow) had been re-positioned to the west, reinforcing the Russian 20th and 8th Guards armies that were already positioned closer to the Russo-Ukrainian border. Additional Russian forces were reported to have moved to Crimea, reinforcing Russian naval and ground units that were previously deployed there. U.S. intelligence officials warned that Russia was planning an upcoming major military offensive into Ukraine scheduled to take place in January 2022. A report released in November 2023 by the international NGO Global Rights found that Russia's defense contractor began buying trucks and three 170-meter bulk carriers to transport grain in December 2021, suggesting earlier Russian planning to loot Ukraine's food supplies.

==== January 2022 ====
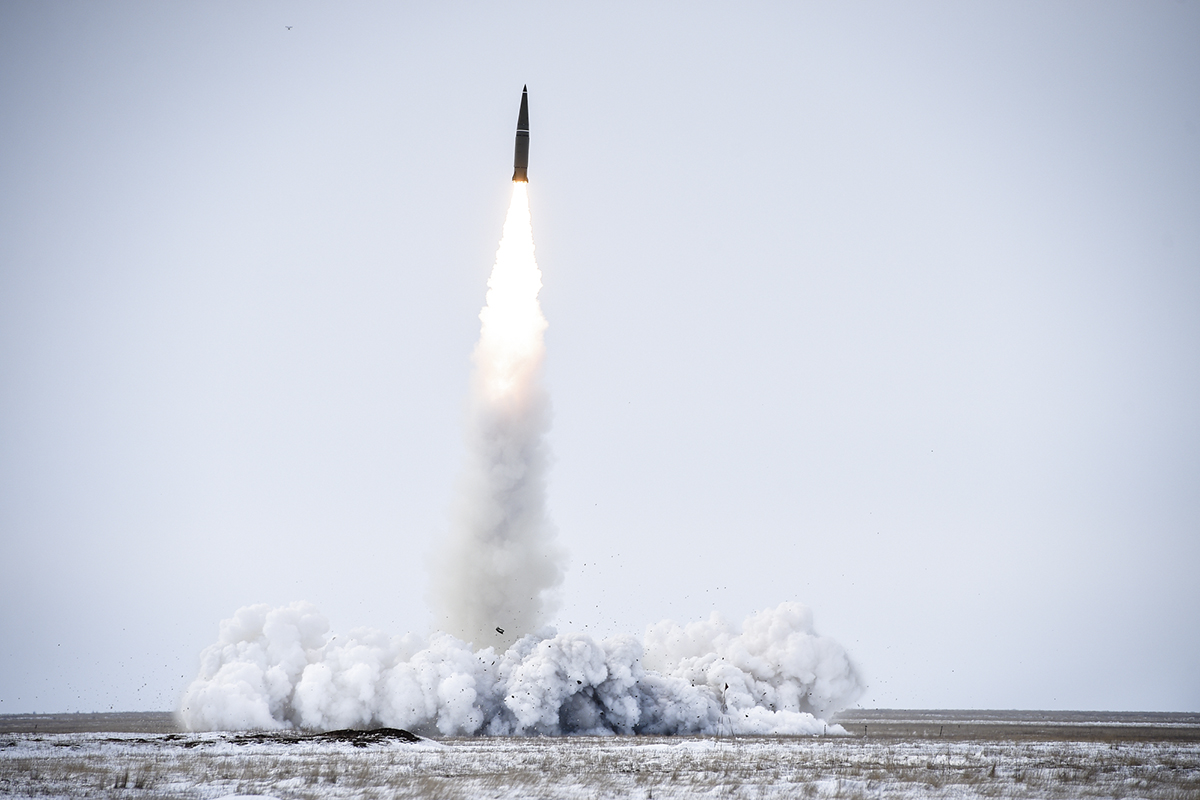
An Iskander-M, launched in 2018

Russia began a slow evacuation of its embassy staff at Kyiv in January 2022. The motives for the evacuation were, at the time, unknown and subjected to multiple speculations. By mid-January, an intelligence assessment produced by the Ukrainian Ministry of Defence estimated that Russia was in its final stages of completing a military buildup at the Russo-Ukrainian border, amassing 127,000 troops in the region. Among the troops, 106,000 were land forces, with the remainder comprising naval and air forces. In addition, 35,000 Russian-backed separatist forces and another 3,000 Russian forces were reported to be present in rebel-held eastern Ukraine. The assessment estimated that Russia had deployed 36 Iskander short-range ballistic missile (SRBM) systems near the border, many stationed within striking distance of Kyiv. The assessment also noted intensified Russian intelligence activity. An analysis conducted by the Atlantic Council on 20 January concluded that Russia had deployed additional critical combat capabilities to the region.

In mid-January, six Russian troop carrier landing ships (Olenegorsky Gornyak, Georgy Pobedonosets, Pyotr Morgunov, Korolyov, Minsk, and Kaliningrad), mostly of the Ropucha class, were redirected from their home ports to the Port of Tartus, and from there entered the Black Sea on 8 and 9 February. On 20 January, Russia announced plans to hold major naval drills in the month to come that would involve all of its naval fleets: 140 vessels, 60 planes, 1,000 units of military hardware, and 10,000 soldiers, deploying in the Mediterranean, the northeast Atlantic Ocean off Ireland, the Pacific, the North Sea and the Sea of Okhotsk.

Beginning on 17 January, major Russian military units were relocated and deployed to Belarus under the auspices of previously planned joint military exercises to be held in February that year. Namely, the headquarters of the Eastern Military District was deployed to Belarus along with combat units drawn from the District's 5th, 29th, 35th, and 36th Combined Arms Army, 76th Guards Air Assault Division, 98th Guards Airborne Division and the Pacific Fleet's 155th Naval Infantry Brigade. Ukrainian and American officials believed that Russia would attempt to use Belarus as a platform to attack Ukraine from the north, due to the close proximity of the Belarusian–Ukrainian border to the capital Kyiv.

On 28 January, Reuters reported that three anonymous U.S. officials had revealed that Russia had stockpiled medical supplies. Two of the three officials claimed that the movements were detected in "recent weeks", adding to fears of conflict. This was preceded by a report on 19 January, in which U.S. president Joe Biden said his "guess" was that Russia "w[ould] move in" to Ukraine although Putin would pay "a serious and dear price" for an invasion and "would regret it". Biden further asserted, "Russia will be held accountable if it invades. And it depends on what it does." In an interview with The Washington Post the next day, Zelenskyy warned that Russian forces could invade and take control of regions in eastern Ukraine. He also argued that an invasion would lead to a large-scale war between Ukraine and Russia.

==== February 2022 ====
On 5 February 2022, two anonymous U.S. officials reported that Russia had assembled 83 battalion tactical groups, estimated to be 70 percent of its combat capabilities, for a full-scale invasion of Ukraine, and predicted that a hypothetical invasion would result in 8,000 to 35,000 military casualties and 25,000 to 50,000 civilian casualties. The officials anticipated that the possible launch window could start on 15 February and persist until the end of March, when extremely cold weather would freeze roads and assist in the movement of mechanised units.

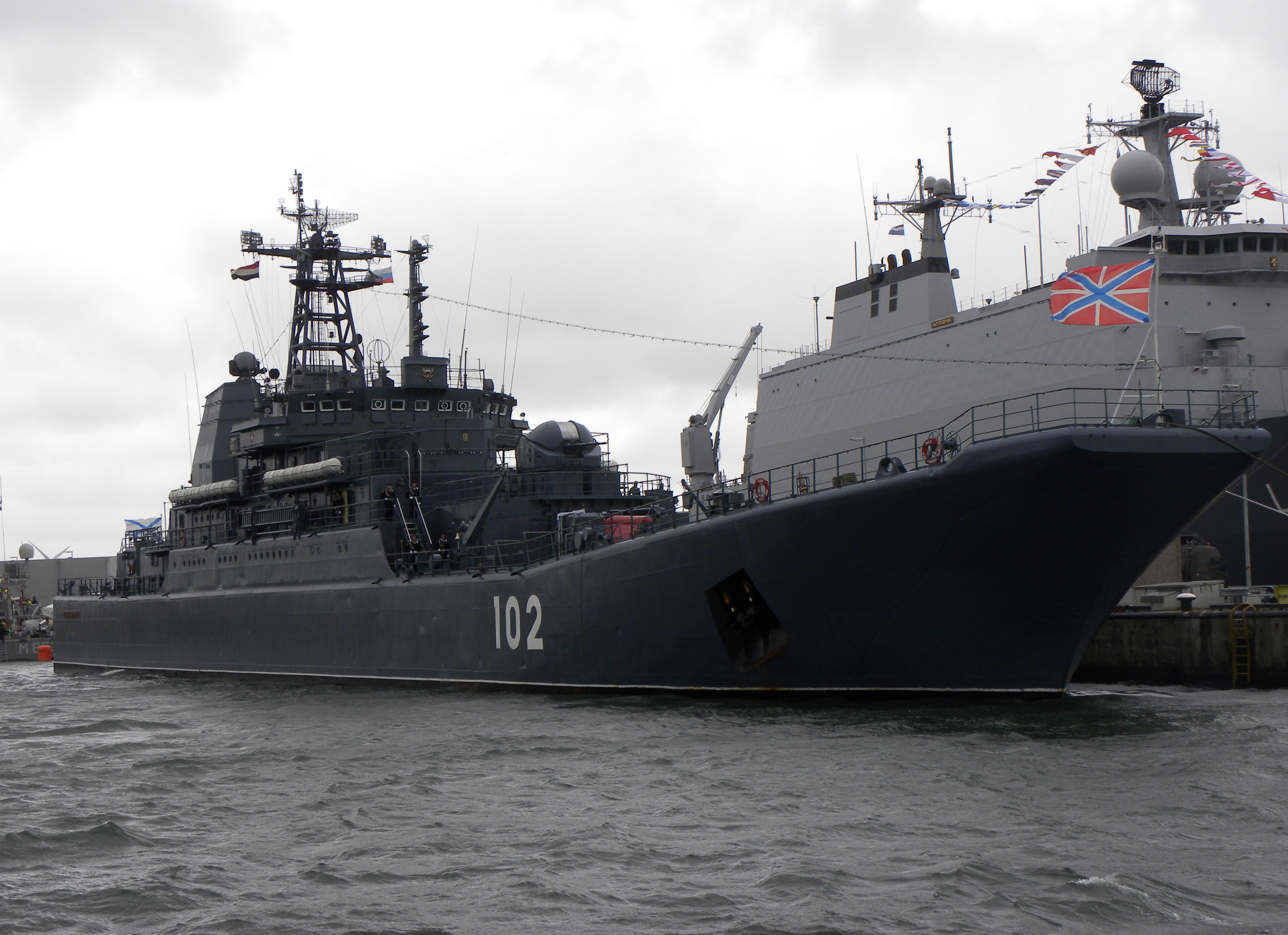
The Kaliningrad, a Ropucha-class landing ship, was among the six landing ships which departed for Sevastopol on 8 February 2022.

On 8 February, a fleet of six Russian landing ships, namely the Korolyov, the Minsk, and Kaliningrad from the Baltic Fleet, and the Pyotr Morgunov, the Georgiy Pobedonosets, and the Olenegorskiy Gornyak from the Northern Fleet, reportedly sailed to the Black Sea for naval exercises. The fleet arrived at Sevastopol two days later, with Russia announcing two major military exercises following their arrival. The first was a naval exercise on the Black Sea, which was protested by Ukraine as it resulted in Russia blocking naval routes in the Kerch Strait, the Sea of Azov, and the Black Sea. The second consisted of a joint military exercise between Belarus and Russia held in regions close to the Belarusian–Ukrainian border, involving 30,000 Russian troops and almost all of the Belarusian armed forces. Responding to the latter, Ukraine held separate military exercises of their own, involving 10,000 Ukrainian troops. Both exercises were scheduled for 10 days.

While NATO and the U.S. had rejected Russia's demand to keep Ukraine out of NATO in January, by early February, the Biden administration had reportedly shifted its position, offering to prevent Ukraine's NATO accession if Russia backed away from the imminent invasion. Referring to unspecified intelligence, U.S. National Security Advisor Jake Sullivan stated an attack could begin at any moment before 20 February, the conclusion of the 2022 Winter Olympics at Beijing. Separately, the media published several reports based on acquired U.S. intelligence that had been briefed to several allies with specific references to 16 February as a potential starting date for a ground invasion. Following these announcements, the U.S. ordered most of its diplomatic staff and all military instructors in Ukraine to evacuate. Numerous countries, including Japan, Germany, Australia, and Israel also urged their citizens to leave Ukraine immediately. The next day, KLM suspended its flights to Ukraine, while other airlines shifted their flight schedules to limit exposure across the country. By 11 February, Biden had issued a public warning to Americans to leave Ukraine as soon as possible.

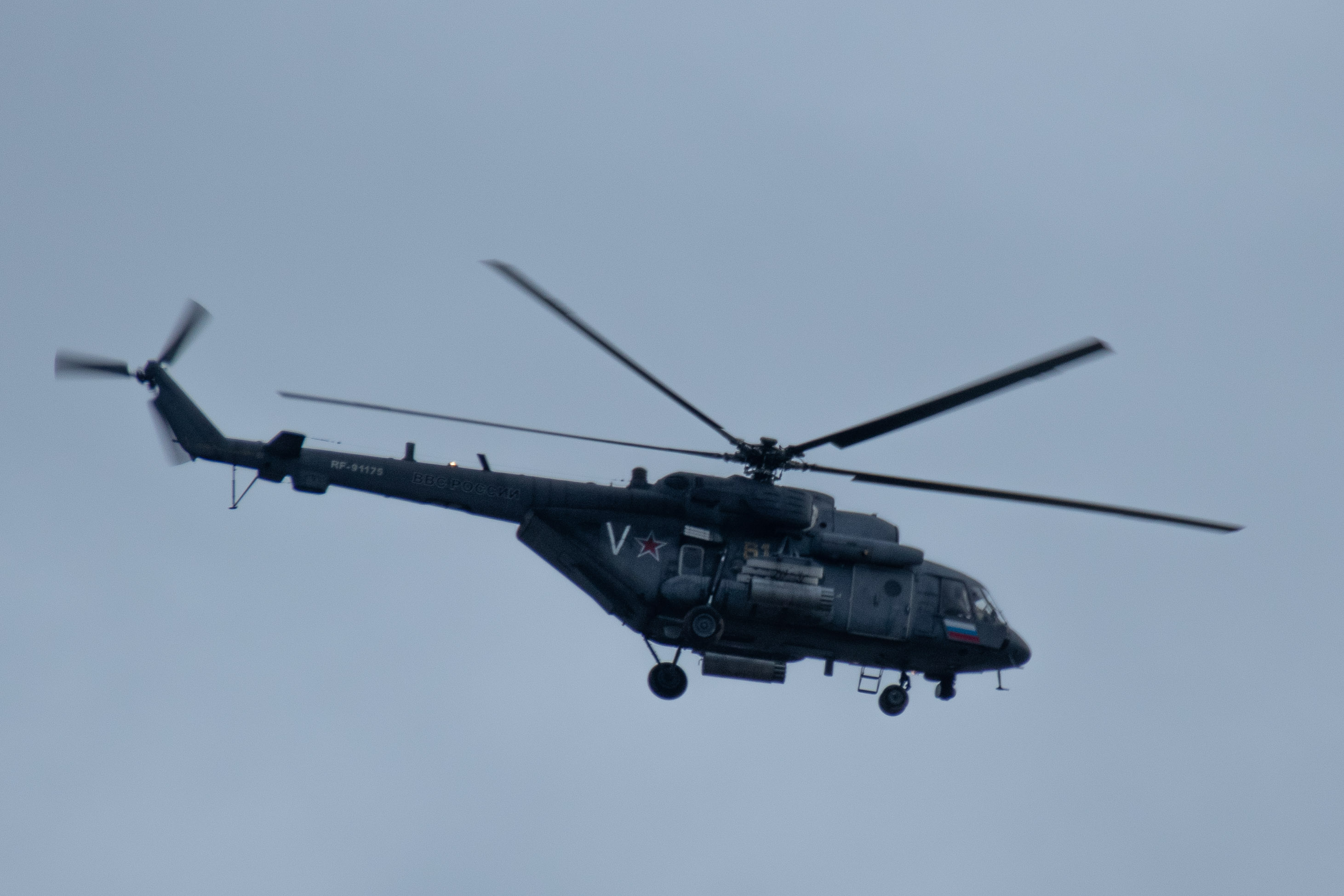
A Russian military helicopter heading south from Minsk, 23 February 2022 (note the "V" symbol)

On 10 February, the Baltic states invoked provisions of the Vienna Document requesting an explanation from Belarus regarding the unusual military activities. The move was followed by Ukraine a day after, where it too invoked Chapter III (risk reduction) of the Vienna Document, requesting Russia to provide "detailed explanations on military activities in the areas adjacent to the territory of Ukraine and in the temporarily occupied Crimea". The request was refused, with Russia asserting that it had no obligation to share the information, although it allowed a Swiss inspection team to enter the territories of Voronezh and Belgorod. On 12 February, the Russian cruise missile submarine Rostov-on-Don (B-237) transited the Dardanelles on its way back to the Black Sea. The Russian Black Sea Fleet conducted live missile and gun firing exercises from 13 to 19 February 2022. In response to Russian military activities, Ukraine requested on 13 February that an emergency meeting within the OSCE be held within the following 48 hours, at which Russia was expected to provide a response.

On 14 February, a telephone conversation was made by Reznikov and his Belarusian counterpart, Viktor Khrenin, where they agreed on mutual confidence-building and transparency measures. These measures included visits by both defence ministers to their respective country's military exercises (Reznikov to the Russo–Belarusian Allied Resolve 2022 exercise, and Khrenin to the Ukrainian Zametil 2022 exercise). The emergency meeting of the OSCE requested by Ukraine was held on 15 February. However, the Russian delegation to the OSCE was absent from the meeting.

On 14 February, Shoigu said units from Russia's Southern and Western military districts had begun returning to their barracks following the completion of "exercises" near Ukraine. However, in a press conference held the subsequent day, Biden commented that they could not verify such reports. NATO Secretary General Jens Stoltenberg refuted Russian claims of retreating troops, stating on 16 February that Russia had continued the military buildup. The Russia Foreign Ministry called earlier Western warnings of a Russia invasion on this day "anti-Russian hysteria" while President Zelenskyy called for a "day of unity" in anticipation of Russian threats.

Top officials from the U.S. and NATO reported on 17 February that the threat of an invasion remained as Russia still actively looked for a casus belli for the invasion, with attempts being made to conduct a false flag operation. On 18 February, Biden announced that he was convinced that Putin had made a decision to invade Ukraine. On 19 February, two Ukrainian soldiers were killed while another five were wounded by artillery fire from separatists. On 20 February, the Belarusian Ministry of Defence announced the continuation of the Allied Resolve 2022 military exercises. According to Khrenin, it was due to the "escalation in military activity along the external borders of the Union State and the deterioration of the situation in Donbas". On the same day, several news outlets reported that U.S. intelligence assessed that Russian commanders had been ordered to proceed with the invasion.

=== Alleged Russian subversion attempts ===
On 26 November 2021, Zelenskyy accused the Russian government and Ukrainian billionaire Rinat Akhmetov of backing a plan to overthrow the Ukrainian government. Russia subsequently denied the claims. On 10 January 2022, the SBU announced that it had arrested a Russian military intelligence agent who was attempting to recruit operatives to conduct attacks at Odesa. Three days later, Ukraine was struck by a cyberattack that affected the official websites of several Ukrainian government ministries. It was later suspected that Russian hackers might be responsible for the incident.

The HUR MOU accused Russian special services of preparing "provocations" against Russian soldiers stationed at Transnistria, a breakaway unrecognised state internationally considered part of Moldova, to create a casus belli for a Russian invasion of Ukraine. The Biden administration later revealed that the Russian government deployed Russian operatives, trained in urban warfare and explosives, as saboteurs to stage a fabricated attack against Russian proxy separatists at eastern Ukraine, to provide Russia with another pretext for an invasion. The Russian government denied the claims. On 3 February, the U.S. said that Russia was planning to use a fabricated video showing a staged Ukrainian "attack" as a pretext for a further invasion of Ukraine. The Russian government denied any plans to orchestrate a pretext for an invasion.

U.S. intelligence sources warned in mid-February that Russia had compiled "lists of Ukrainian political figures and other prominent individuals to be targeted for either arrest or assassination" in the event of an invasion, while U.S. ambassador Bathsheba Nell Crocker wrote that Russia "will likely use lethal measures to disperse peaceful protests [...] from civilian populations".

==== 2022 Ukrainian coup d'état attempt ====
Between January and February 2022, the Russian Federal Security Service (FSB) and up to 500 recruited ATO veterans allegedly attempted to overthrow the Ukrainian government and install pro-Russian rule in various cities for their further surrender to the Russian Army. Amongst those recruited include the Chechen Kadyrovites, Wagner Group mercenaries, and other pro-Russian forces, particularly past Party of Regions members (including former Yanukovych officials) and individuals affiliated with Ukrainian Choice. The plan was ultimately cancelled after its key individuals were detained in Ivano-Frankivsk, Khmelnytskyi, and Odesa oblasts by SBU and National Police forces. Before their arrests, the agents managed to conduct one successful operation to ensure the capture of Chornobyl.

According to a detained agent who was set to participate in the coup, Russia was to send an appeal to Ukrainian authorities asking them to surrender; if the appeal was declined, pro-Russian agents would stage a coup. The coup would begin by creating false-flag incidents in Kyiv and along Ukraine's border with Transnistria to create a pretext for invasion. After the invasion started, agents would seize the administrative buildings of multiple cities, install pro-Russian officials, and ultimately surrender and transfer them to Russian troops. To further destabilise the situation, mass riots with the use of fake blood, clashing with law enforcement officers, terrorist attacks, and the assassination of President Zelenskyy were also planned. After the coup, the Verkhovna Rada would be dissolved and replaced by a pro-Russian "People's Rada", playing the role of a puppet government on Russian-occupied territory and newly created "people's republics" in Western Ukraine. The agent also claimed a pro-Russian president was planned to be installed in Ukraine.

On 22 January 2022, the UK Foreign Office corroborated parts of the agent's account, stating that Russia was preparing a plan to "install a pro-Russian leader in Kyiv as it considers whether to invade and occupy Ukraine," with Yevhen Murayev, a former member of the Ukrainian parliament, alleged to be one of Moscow's potential candidates. The Russian Foreign Ministry denied the claims, calling the statements "disinformation", and accusing the UK as well as NATO of "escalating tensions" around Ukraine. Murayev, who had stated in a Facebook post on 23 January 2022 that "Ukraine needs new politicians", dismissed the allegation as "nonsense", saying he had already been "under Russian sanctions for four years".

=== Russian accusations of genocide in eastern Ukraine ===
On 9 December 2021, Putin spoke of discrimination against Russian speakers outside Russia, saying: "I have to say that Russophobia is a first step towards genocide. You and I know what is happening in Donbass. It certainly looks very much like genocide." Russia also condemned the Ukrainian language law. On 15 February 2022, Putin told the press: "What is going on in Donbas is exactly genocide." Several international organisations, including the UN High Commissioner for Human Rights (OHCHR), OSCE Special Monitoring Mission to Ukraine, and the Council of Europe found no evidence supporting the Russian claims. The genocide allegations have been rejected by the European Commission as Russian disinformation.

The U.S. embassy in Ukraine described Russian genocide claims as a "reprehensible falsehood", while U.S. State Department Spokesperson Ned Price said the Russian government was making such claims as "an excuse for invading Ukraine". On 18 February, Russian Ambassador to the U.S. Anatoly Antonov replied to a question about U.S. officials, who doubted the fact of the genocide of Russians in Donbas, by posting a statement on the Embassy's Facebook page that said: 'This causes outrage and indignation. [...] We see here not just double standards of the United States, but quite a primitive and crude cynicism. [...] The main geopolitical goal of the United States is to push Russia back to the East as far possible. To that end, a policy to force the Russian-speaking population out of their current places of residence is needed. Therefore, Americans prefer not only to ignore the attempts of forced assimilation of Russians in Ukraine, but also strongly condone them with political and military support."

=== Ukrainian defences ===
In preparation for a possible renewed Russian invasion, the Ukrainian Ground Forces announced a meeting in April 2021 regarding territorial defences to strengthen and protect the nation's borders and critical facilities, and to combat sabotage and reconnaissance groups in southern Ukraine. During the same month, Zelenskyy visited Ukrainian defensive positions in Donbas. According to Russia, Ukraine deployed 125,000 troops to the Donbas conflict zone in December 2021.

The United States estimated in December 2021 that Russia could assemble over 175,000 troops to invade Ukraine. Oleksii Reznikov, Ukrainian Minister of Defence, stated that "we have 250,000 official [...] members of our army. Plus, I said 400,000 veterans and 200,000 reservists. 175,000 [is] not enough to go to Ukraine." Reznikov claimed that Russia could launch a large-scale attack on Ukraine in late-January 2022.

Ukraine's Territorial Defence Forces (the reserve component of the Ground Forces established after the 2014 conflict) recruited additional citizens and trained them in urban guerrilla tactics and firearms use. Such insurgency tactics, as reported by The New York Times, could support a resistance movement if the Russian military were able to overwhelm the Ukrainian military. Andrii Zahorodniuk, former Ukrainian Minister of Defence, wrote in January that in the case of a Russian invasion, the Russian forces would likely destroy "key elements of the country's military infrastructure" and will be able to "advance deep into Ukrainian territory", but would face difficulty in securing it. Zahorodniuk further stated, "Russian occupation forces will face highly motivated opponents fighting in familiar surroundings."

==== Foreign support ====
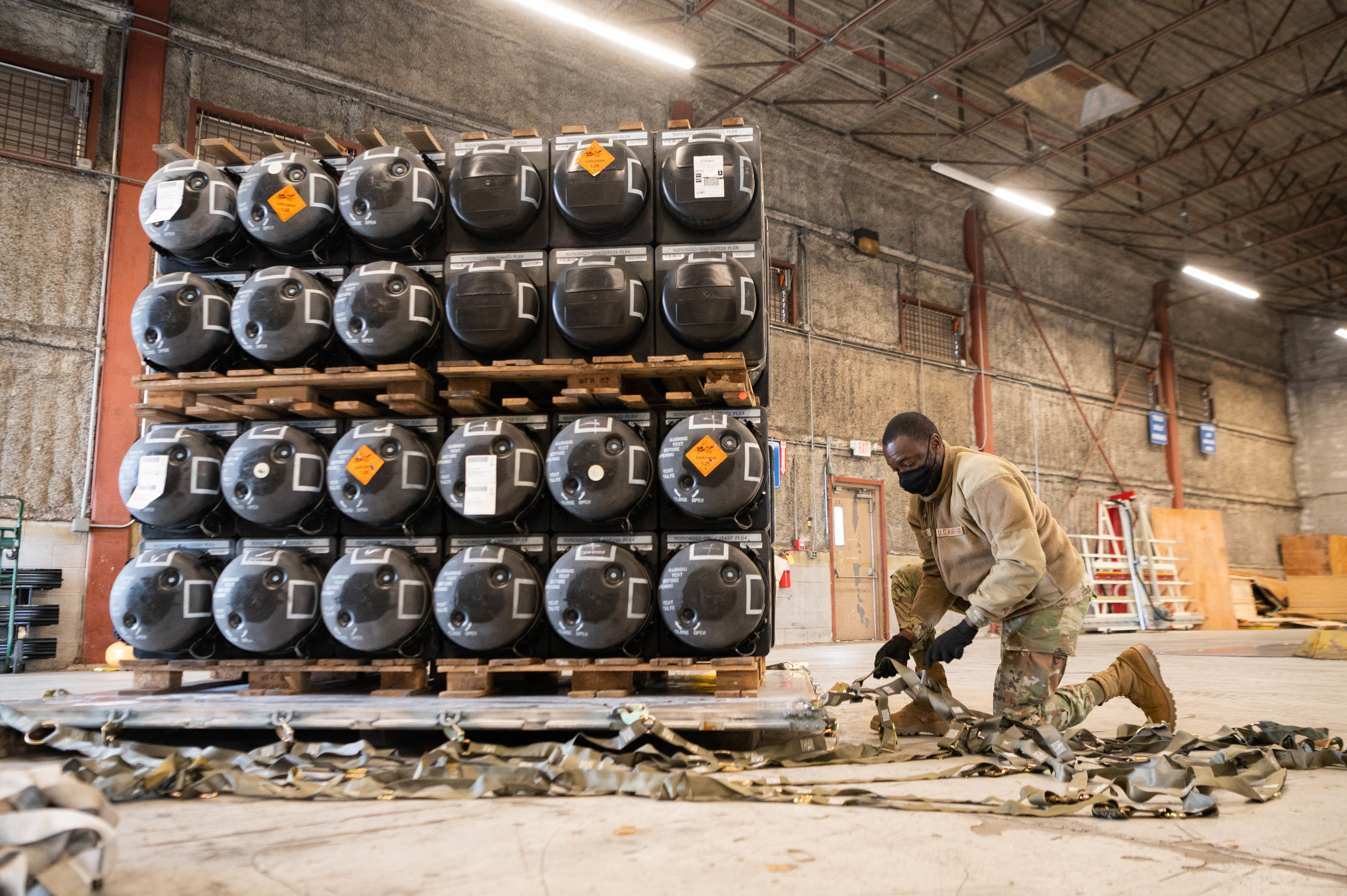
A U.S. airman of the 436th Aerial Port Squadron at Dover Air Force Base preparing FGM-148 Javelins to be delivered to Ukraine, 21 January 2022

In response to expectations of a renewed invasion with Russia's buildup of over 100,000 troops, some NATO member nations in January 2022 began providing military aid, including lethal weapons, with the U.S. giving approval to its NATO allies to send anti-armour missiles and other U.S.-made weapons. The first U.S. shipment of some 90 tonnes (200,000 lb) of lethal weapons arrived in Ukraine on 22 January 2022. The U.S. provided FGM-148 Javelin antitank missiles, anti-armour artillery (including M141 Bunker Defeat Munitions), heavy machine guns, small arms, ammunition, secure radio systems, medical equipment and spare parts. U.S. Secretary of Defense Lloyd Austin and Chairman of the Joint Chiefs of Staff Mark Milley threatened US support for an anti-Russian insurgency within Ukraine, similar to the CIA's assistance to anti-Soviet mujahideen rebels in Afghanistan in the 1980s.

In December 2021, the U.S. government approved additional defence aid for US$200 million to Ukraine. This was in addition to previous aid packages to Ukraine, making the total defence aid given in 2021 worth US$650 million. The U.S. also announced plans to transfer Mil Mi-17 helicopters to Ukraine, which had been previously flown by the Afghan Air Force; the first helicopters were supplied on 20 February 2022. In January 2022, the Biden administration granted permission to the Baltic nations to transfer American-made equipment to Ukraine. Estonia donated Javelin anti-tank missiles to Ukraine, while Latvia and Lithuania provided Stinger air defence systems and associated equipment. On 19 January, the Biden administration provided $200 million in additional security aid to Ukraine while on February 28, it approved the first deliveries of American-made FIM-92 Stinger surface-to-air missiles to the country.

Other NATO members also provided aid to Ukraine, with the UK and Canada bolstering pre-existing military training programs in January 2022. The British deployed additional military trainers and provided light anti-armour defence systems, while the Canadians deployed a small special forces delegation to aid Ukraine. On 17 January, British Defence Secretary Ben Wallace announced that Britain had supplied Ukraine with 1,100 short-range anti-tank missiles. On 20 January, Sky News reported that 2,000 short-range anti-tank NLAW missiles had been delivered via numerous Royal Air Force C-17 transport aircraft between the UK and Ukraine. On 21 January, the UK Defence Journal reported that there had been an increase in Royal Air Force RC-135W Rivet Joint surveillance aircraft being deployed to monitor Russian forces on the Russo-Ukrainian border.

In addition, multiple EU members individually gave support to Ukraine, with the Danish government announcing on 16 January 2022 that they would provide Ukraine with a €22 million (US$24.8 million) defence package. This was followed by a public statement on 21 January by the Dutch Minister of Foreign Affairs Wopke Hoekstra who said that the Netherlands was ready to deliver "defensive military support" and explained that Ukraine request to the country for arms assistance the previous day was supported by majority in parliament. On 31 January, Poland announced its decision to supply Ukraine with lethal weapons. It intended to provide significant quantities of light ammunition, artillery shells, light mortar systems, reconnaissance drones, and Polish-made Piorun MANPADS. A trilateral pact was launched between Poland, Ukraine and the United Kingdom on 17 February 2022 with the aim of responding to European security threats and deepening bilateral relationships in matters of cyber security, energy independence and countering disinformation.

=== Reinforcements deployed in NATO ===
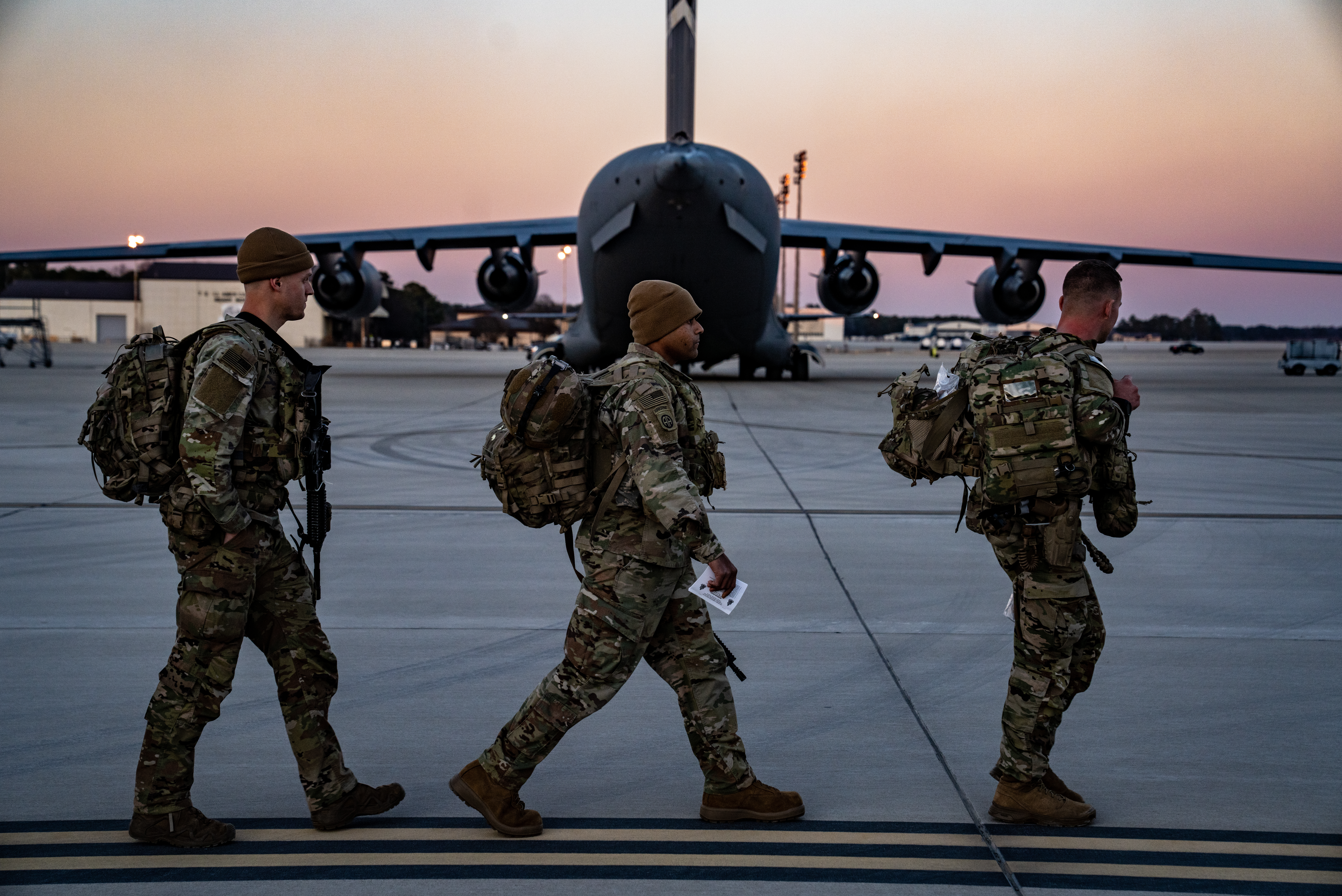
U.S. paratroopers of the Immediate Response Force were deployed to eastern Europe to reinforce NATO's eastern flank amid the crisis in February 2022.

The Dutch and Spanish governments deployed forces to the region in support of NATO. On 20 January 2022, Spanish Defence Minister Margarita Robles announced the deployment of the Spanish Navy to the Black Sea. The patrol vessel Meteoro, acting as a minesweeper, was already en route and the frigate Blas de Lezo departed on 22 January. Robles announced that the Spanish government was considering deploying the Spanish Air Force to Bulgaria, a fellow NATO member; four Eurofighters were deployed on 12 February. The Netherlands stated it would send two F-35s to the Graf Ignatievo Air Base in Bulgaria to assist NATO's expanded air surveillance mission.

The first of 2,000 newly deployed U.S. soldiers to Europe arrived in Germany and Poland on 5 February, part of the U.S.'s attempt to bolster NATO's eastern flank during Russia's military buildup. Two days later, British prime minister Johnson said the country would not "flinch" as he prepared to deploy Royal Marines, RAF aircraft, and Royal Navy warships to eastern Europe. On 11 February, the U.S. announced an additional deployment of 3,000 troops to Poland and sent F-15 jets to Romania. Further deployments included four Danish F-16 fighter jets being sent to Lithuania, in addition to a frigate travelling to the Baltic Sea. The chief of staff of the Belgian army also stated that the country was ready to send more forces to NATO's eastern allies.

== Escalation and invasion (February 2022 – present) ==
=== Alleged clashes between Russia and Ukraine ===
Fighting in the Donbas escalated significantly on 17 February 2022. There was a sharp increase in artillery shelling by Russian-led militants in Donbas, which Ukraine and its allies considered to be an attempt to provoke the Ukrainian army or create a pretext for invading. While the daily number of attacks over the first six weeks of 2022 was 2 to 5, the Ukrainian military reported 60 attacks on 17 February. Russian state media also reported over 20 artillery attacks on separatist positions the same day. Russian separatists shelled a kindergarten at Stanytsia Luhanska using artillery, injuring three civilians. The Luhansk People's Republic said that its forces had been attacked by the Ukrainian government with mortars, grenade launchers, and machine gun fire.

On 18 February, the Donetsk People's Republic and the Luhansk People's Republic ordered emergency mandatory evacuations of civilians from their respective capital cities, although it has been noted that full evacuations would take months to accomplish. A BBC analysis found that the video announcing the "emergency" evacuation had been filmed two days before its purported date, indicated by its metadata. Russian state media also reported a "car bombing", allegedly targeting the separatist government headquarters in Donetsk.

On 21 February, Russia's FSB said that Ukrainian shelling had destroyed an FSB border facility 150 m from the Russia–Ukraine border in Rostov Oblast. Separately, the press service of the Southern Military District said that Russian forces had killed a group of five saboteurs that morning near the village of Mityakinskaya, Rostov Oblast. The press release alleged that the saboteurs had penetrated the border from Ukraine in two infantry fighting vehicles, which were destroyed in the act. Ukraine denied being involved in both incidents and called them a false flag. Additionally, two Ukrainian soldiers and a civilian were reported killed by shelling in the village of Zaitseve, 30 km north of Donetsk. The Ukrainian News Agency reported that the Luhansk Thermal Power Plant, located close to the contact line, was forced to shut down on 21 February after being shelled by unknown forces. Several analysts, including the investigative website Bellingcat, published evidence that many of the claimed attacks, explosions, and evacuations in Donbas were staged by Russia.

=== Recognition of the Donetsk and Luhansk People's Republics ===
Vladimir Putin, alongside Denis Pushilin and Leonid Pasechnik, signing decrees recognising the independence of the self-proclaimed Donetsk and Luhansk people's republics on 21 February 2022

On 21 January 2022, the Communist Party of the Russian Federation announced on Pravda that its deputies would introduce a non-binding resolution in the State Duma to ask Putin to officially recognise the breakaway Donetsk People's Republic and Luhansk People's Republic. The resolution was adopted by the State Duma on 15 February in a 351–16 vote, with one abstention; it was supported by United Russia, the Communist Party of the Russian Federation, A Just Russia - For Truth and the Liberal Democratic Party of Russia, but was opposed by the New People party.

On 21 February, the leaders of the self-proclaimed Donetsk and Luhansk people's republics, respectively Denis Pushilin and Leonid Pasechnik, requested that Putin officially recognise the republics' independence; both leaders also proposed signing a treaty on friendship and cooperation with Russia, including on military cooperation. Concluding the extraordinary session of the Security Council of Russia held on that day, Putin said that the decision on recognition thereof would be taken that day.

The request was endorsed by Minister of Defence Sergey Shoigu. Prime Minister Mikhail Mishustin said the government had been laying the groundwork for such move for "many months already". Later that day, Putin signed decrees of recognition of the republics. Additionally, treaties "on friendship, co-operation and mutual assistance" between Russia and the republics were inked. Following the recognition, Putin ordered Russian forces to enter both separatist republics.

==== Putin's denial of Ukrainian statehood ====
In a speech on 21 February 2022, Putin claimed that "modern Ukraine was wholly and fully created by Bolshevik, communist Russia". Putin denounced anti-communist Ukrainians as "ungrateful descendants" saying, "This is what they call decommunization. Do you want decommunization? Well, that suits us just fine. But it is unnecessary, as they say, to stop halfway. We are ready to show you what real decommunization means for Ukraine." Sarah Rainsford wrote in BBC News that Putin's speech was "rewriting Ukraine's history", and that his focus on the country was "obsessive". BBC Ukrainian correspondent Vitaly Chervonenko noted how carefully Putin kept silent about the independent Ukrainian state formations of 1917–1920 and Kyiv's war with Lenin's Bolshevik government, whose purpose was to include Ukraine in Bolshevik Russia.

In response to Putin's speech, Professor of Ukrainian history at Harvard University Serhii Plokhy asserted that, "[o]f course, Lenin did not create Ukraine. In 1918, he started a war against an independent Ukrainian state and then replaced it with a puppet state called the Ukrainian Soviet Socialist Republic", later taking away Ukraine's formal independence by integrating it into the Soviet Union in 1922. According to Plokhy, the "modern Ukrainian state came into existence not thanks to Lenin but against his wishes and in direct reaction to the Bolshevik putsch in Petrograd in [...] 1917. The Bolsheviks tried to take control of Kyiv as well but were defeated, jumpstarting the process of the modern Ukrainian state-building." Instead, Lenin is responsible for the creation of the Russian Federation, "a state that received its constitution in 1918 and became part of the USSR four years later", and thus, "Lenin was the creator of modern Russia, not Ukraine, and should be considered as such."

==== International sanctions on Russia ====
In response to the recognition of the two breakaway republics, Western countries rolled out sanctions against Russia. On 22 February 2022, British prime minister Boris Johnson announced sanctions on five Russian banks, namely Rossiya Bank, Industrialny Sberegatelny Bank, General Bank, Promsvyazbank, and Black Sea Bank, as well as three billionaire associates of Putin (Gennady Timchenko, Boris Romanovich Rotenberg, and Igor Rotenberg). German chancellor Scholz announced a halt to the certification process of the Nord Stream 2 pipeline.

EU foreign ministers blacklisted all members of the Russian Duma who voted in favour of the recognition of the breakaway regions, banned EU investors from trading in Russian state bonds, and targeted imports and exports with separatist entities. U.S. president Joe Biden announced sanctions on banks VEB.RF and Promsvyazbank and comprehensive sanctions on Russia's sovereign debt.

=== Invasion ===
On 21 February 2022, following the recognition of the Donetsk and Luhansk republics, Putin ordered additional Russian troops into Donbas, in what Russia called a "peacekeeping mission". Later on the same day, several independent media outlets confirmed that Russian forces were entering Donbas. On 22 February, the United States declared this movement an "invasion". On the same day, the Federation Council unanimously authorised Putin to use military force outside Russia. Zelenskyy ordered reservists called up, while not committing to general mobilisation yet.

On 6 February, U.S. officials warned that Kyiv could fall within days and prompt a refugee crisis in Europe. On 23 February, an unidentified senior U.S. defense official was quoted by news media as saying that "80 percent" of Russian forces assigned and arrayed along Ukraine's border were ready for battle and that a ground incursion could commence at any moment. On the same day, the Ukrainian parliament approved Zelenskyy's decree on the introduction of a state of emergency from 00:00 on 24 February 2022 across the territory of all Ukraine, except the Donetsk and Luhansk regions, for a period of 30 days. The Ukrainian Ministry of Foreign Affairs recommended that Ukrainian citizens refrain from travel to Russia and those living in Russia leave the country "immediately".

At about 4 a.m. Moscow time on 24 February 2022, President Putin announced the beginning of a "special military operation" in the Donbas region. Shortly after, reports of big explosions came from multiple cities in central and eastern Ukraine, including Kyiv and Kharkiv. The U.S. announced that it would not send its combat troops into Ukraine to intervene militarily due to fears that it may provoke full-scale war between the United States and Russia. Many observers at the time believed that Russian military operations in Ukraine would inevitably lead to the capitulation of the Ukrainian government and end to the country's national sovereignty. This proved to be untrue, with Russia unable to eliminate the Ukrainian government following the failure of the Russian offensive on Kyiv, and experiencing major setbacks as a result of Ukrainian counteroffensives in the Kharkiv and Kherson regions.

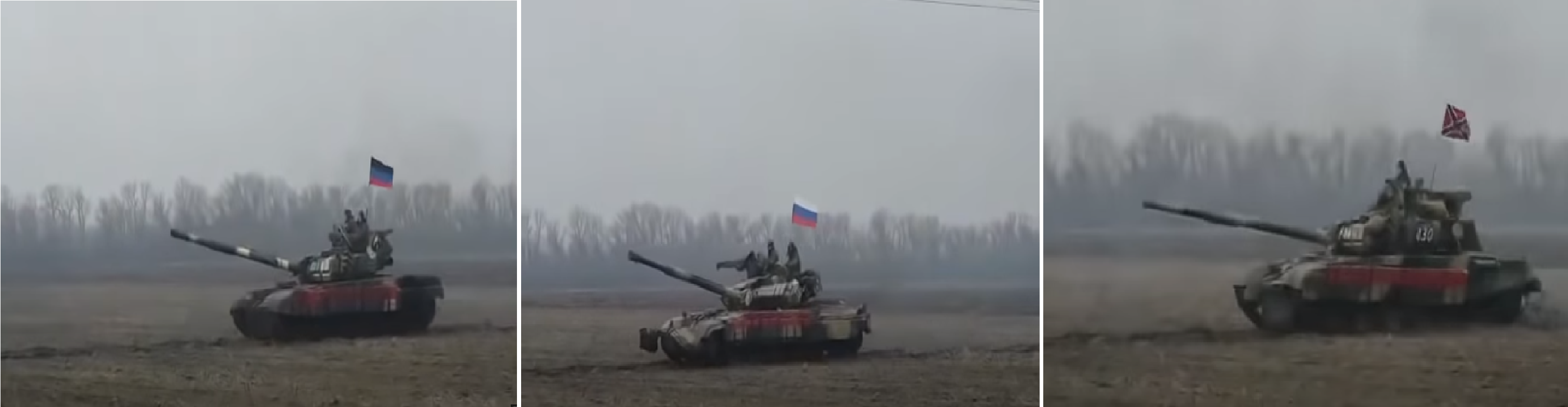
Pre-invasion day panorama from southeastern Ukraine, 23 February 2022

== Diplomatic negotiations ==
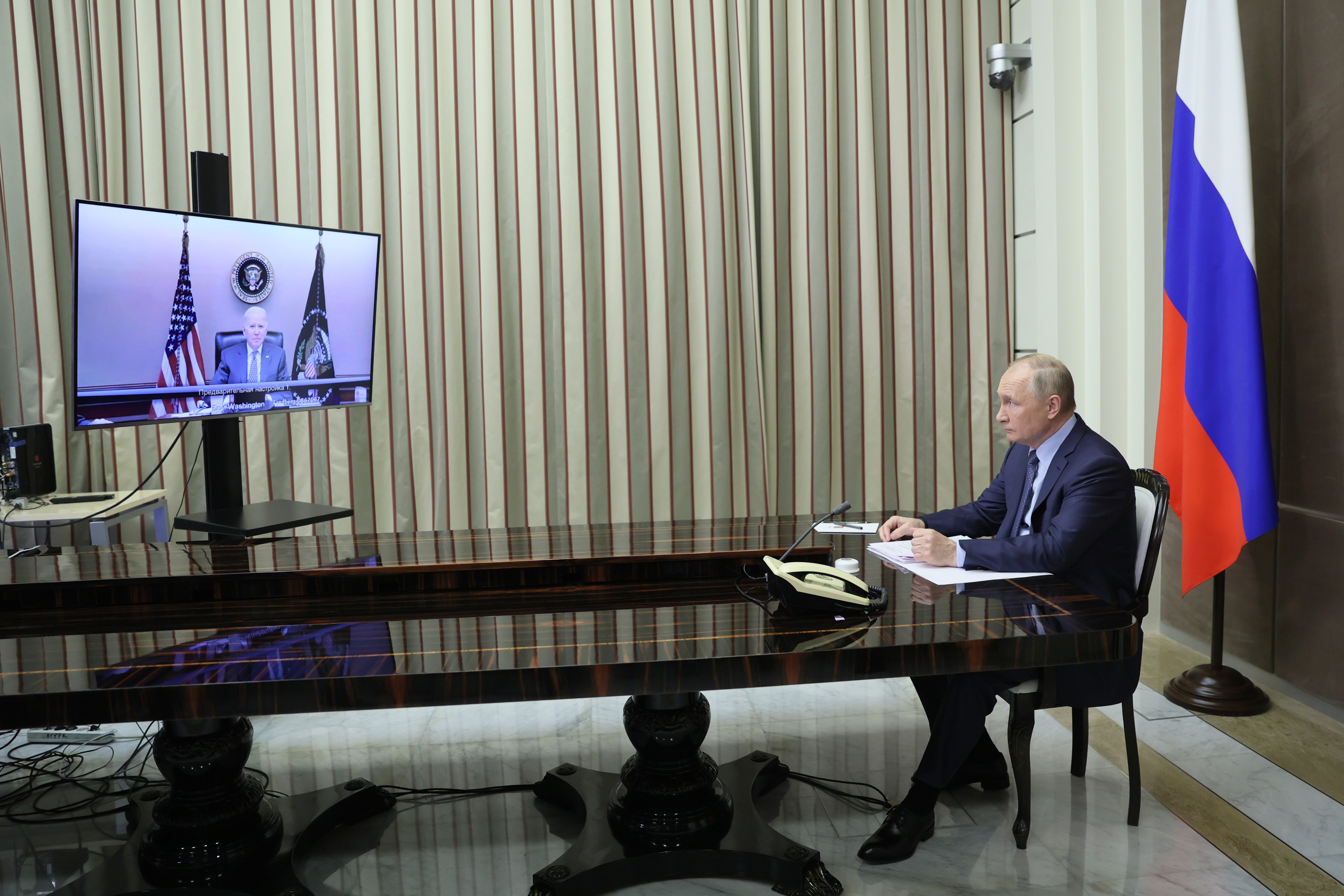
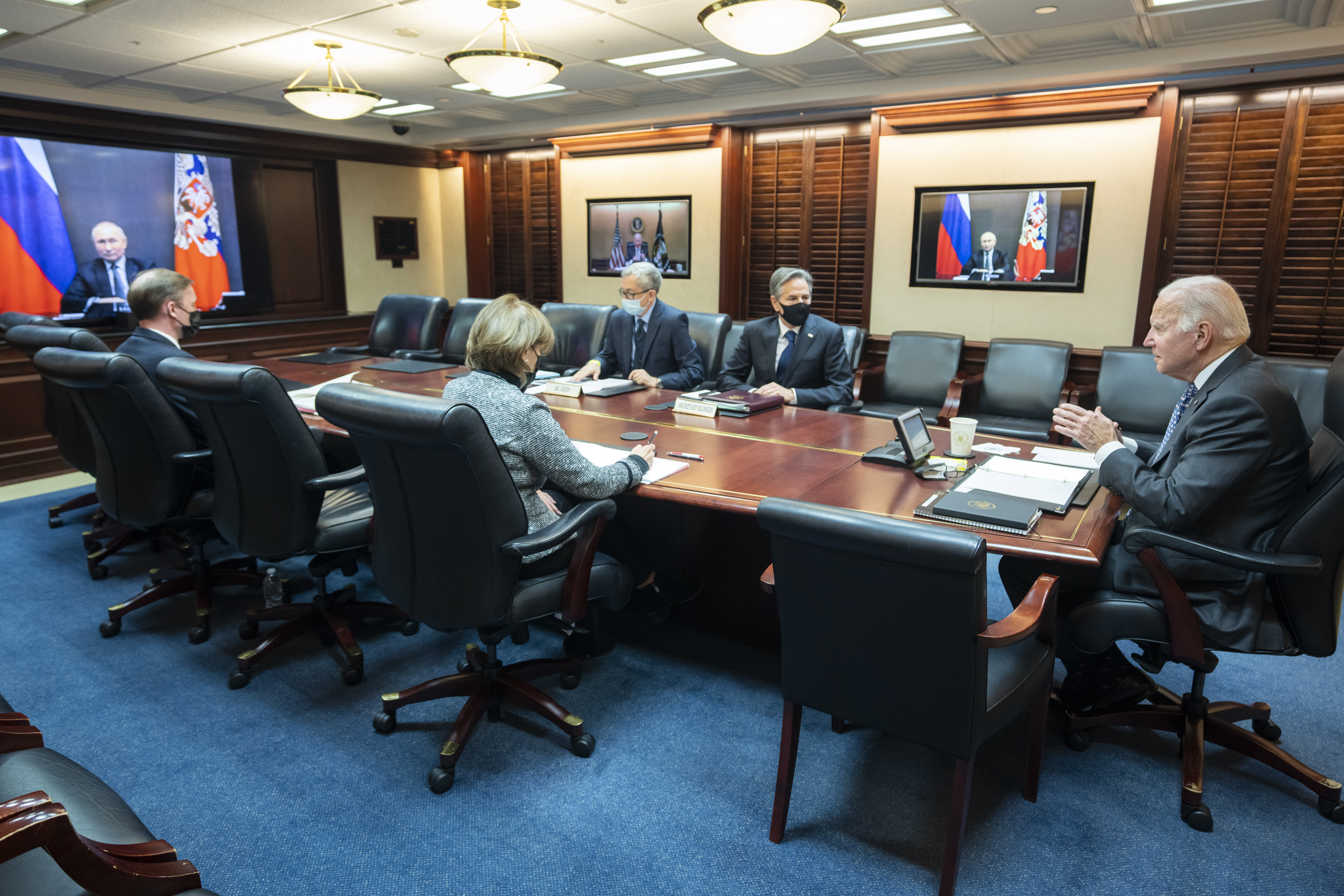
U.S. president Joe Biden holding a video call with Russian president Vladimir Putin on 7 December 2021

Between 2 and 3 November 2021, CIA director William Burns met with senior Russian intelligence officials in Moscow to convey to the Kremlin Biden's concern about the situation on the Russo-Ukrainian border. Burns and U.S. Ambassador to Russia John Sullivan met in Moscow with Putin's national security adviser Nikolai Patrushev and informed him that they knew about Russia's invasion plans. Burns warned that if Putin proceeded down this path, the West would respond with severe consequences for Russia. Sullivan recounted that Patrushev was undeterred, "supremely confident". CNN reported that Burns spoke by phone with Zelenskyy following the meeting in Moscow. Simultaneously, a high-ranking U.S. Department of State official was dispatched to Ukraine.

On 15 November, acting German Foreign Minister Heiko Maas and French Foreign Minister Jean-Yves Le Drian expressed concern in a joint communique about "Russian movements of troops and hardware near Ukraine", calling on both sides to adopt and maintain "a posture of restraint". At the same time, Pentagon Press Secretary John Kirby confirmed that the United States continued to observe "unusual military activity" by Russia near the Russo-Ukrainian border. U.S. Secretary of State Antony Blinken discussed reports of "Russian military activity" in the area with Le Drian. On 16 November, NATO Secretary General Jens Stoltenberg told reporters that it was important NATO "doesn't increase tensions, but we have to be clear-eyed, we need to be realistic about the challenges we face". Stoltenberg added that the alliance saw an "unusual concentration" of Russian forces, which Russia might be willing to use "to conduct aggressive actions against Ukraine".

In early November 2021, Ukrainian intelligence assessed the information about the transfer of additional Russian troops to the Ukrainian borders as "an element of psychological pressure." A week later, the Office of the President of Ukraine acknowledged that Russia was building up "specific groups of troops" near the border. Ukrainian foreign minister Dmytro Kuleba urged the French and German governments to prepare for a possible military scenario of Russia's actions against Ukraine.

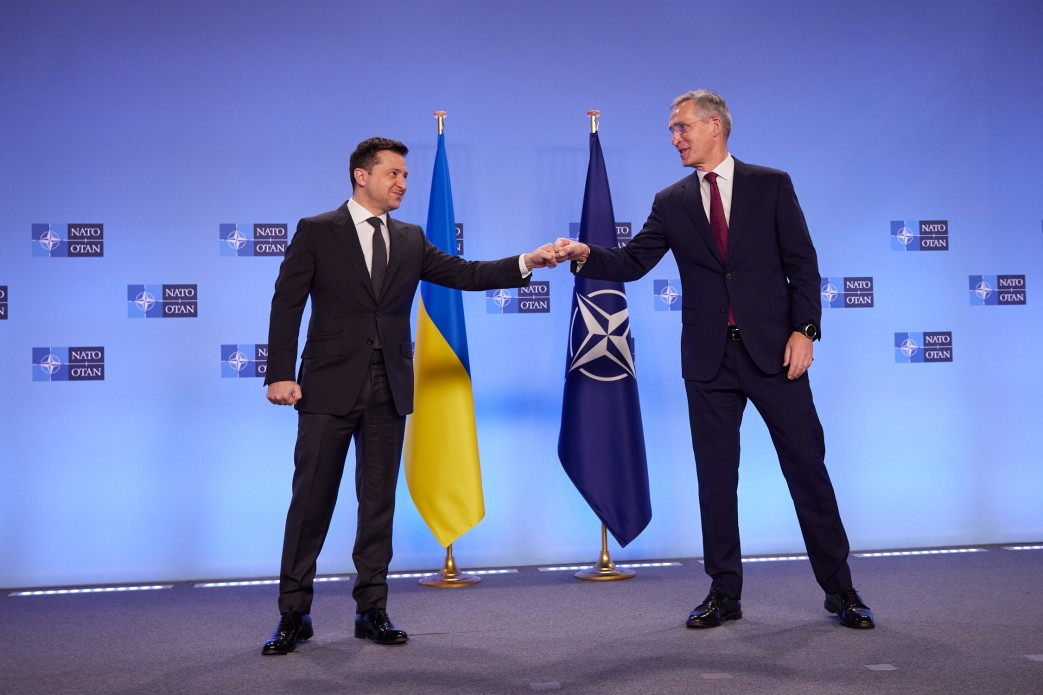
Ukrainian president Volodymyr Zelenskyy and NATO Secretary General Jens Stoltenberg in Brussels, 16 December 2021

On 15 November, Zelenskyy and the head of the European Council (EUCO) Charles Michel discussed "the security situation along the borders of Ukraine." On the same day, Kuleba held talks on the same issues in Brussels. Ukrainian defence minister Oleksii Reznikov went to Washington D.C., where on 18 November he met with U.S. secretary of defense Lloyd Austin. On 16 November, British defence secretary Ben Wallace visited Kyiv.

Israel maintains a strong relationship with both Ukraine and Russia, and sometimes acts as an interlocutor between the two. In April 2021, Zelenskyy asked the Israeli prime minister Benjamin Netanyahu to mediate the situation between himself and Putin. Israel raised the idea with Russia, who declined. In a meeting at Kyiv in October with Zelenskyy, Israeli president Isaac Herzog told Zelenskyy that the new Israeli government under Prime Minister Naftali Bennett was willing to resume efforts at Ukrainian-Russian mediation. Bennett raised the idea in a meeting with Putin two weeks later at Sochi, but Putin declined.

In late January, the United States was again discussing sanctions with European allies in case of a Russian invasion. Biden said the sanctions would be "swift and severe, including a "game over" strategy of targeting Russian banks, bond markets and the assets of elites close to Putin. This approach was also criticised, and the proposed cut-off of Russian banks from the Visa, Mastercard, and SWIFT payment systems was withdrawn. The challenge for U.S. and NATO vis-à-vis Russia is the creation of credible deterrence with a plan for a de-escalatory sequence, including a reduction in inflammatory rhetoric, Russian troop withdrawals from the Russo-Ukrainian border, renewed Donbas peace talks, as well as a temporary halt on military exercises at the Black and Baltic Seas by the U.S., NATO or Russia.

A Normandy Format meeting was planned between Russian, Ukrainian, German and French senior officials at Paris on 26 January 2022, with a follow-up phone call between the French president Emmanuel Macron and Putin on 28 January. Ukraine fulfilled Russia's condition for a meeting at Paris and decided to withdraw a controversial draft law on the reintegration of Crimea and Donbas from the Ukrainian parliament, as contradicting the Minsk peace agreements.

On 7 February 2022, Macron met Putin in Moscow, with mixed outcomes: Macron said that Putin told him that Russia will not further escalate the crisis; Putin scoffed at assertions that NATO is a "defensive alliance" and warned the Western countries that if Ukraine joined NATO and "decided to take back Crimea using military means, European countries will automatically be in a military conflict with Russia." Putin promised Macron not to carry out new military initiatives near Ukraine.

=== NATO–Russia security talks ===
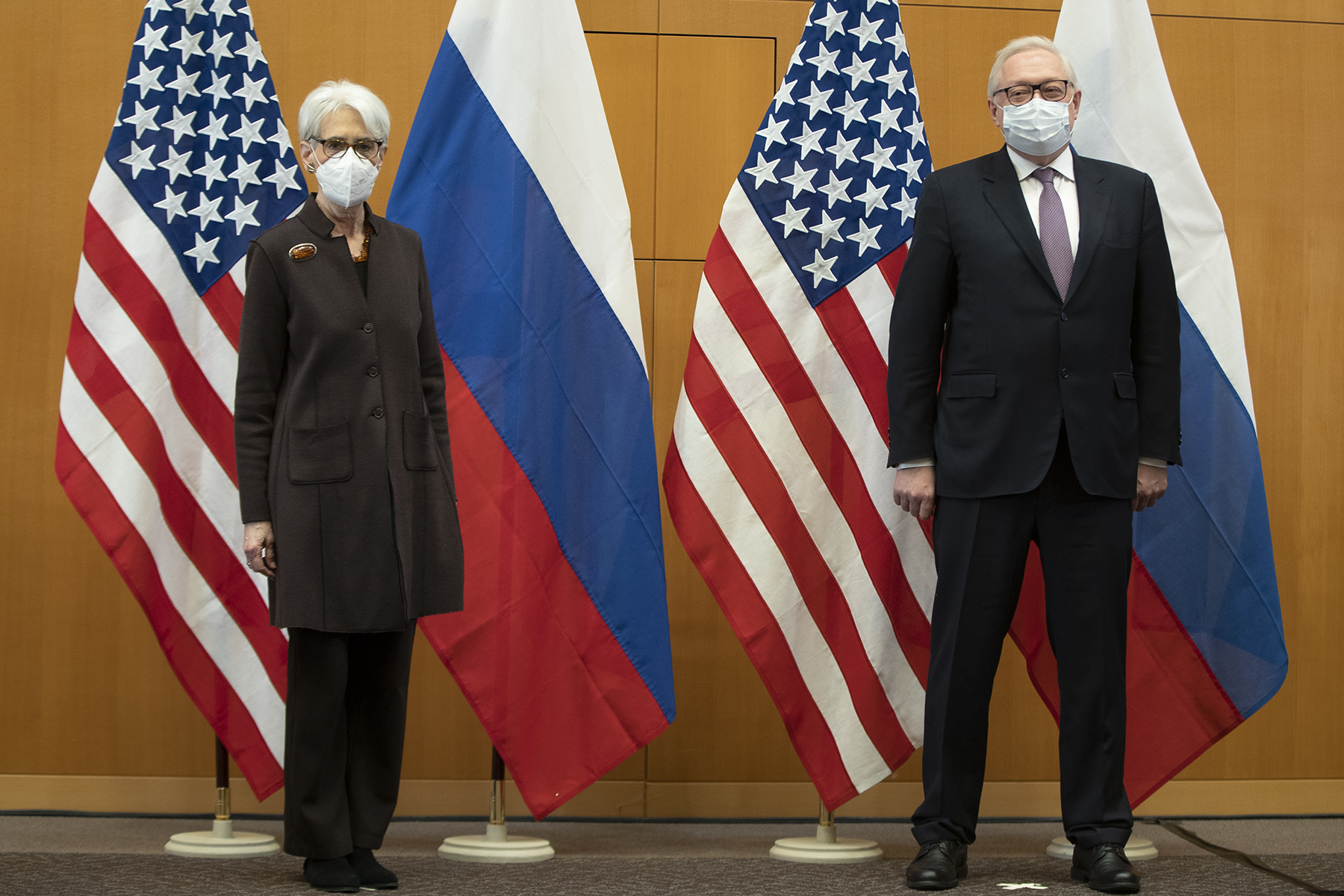
U.S. Deputy Secretary of State Wendy Sherman meeting with Russian Deputy Foreign Minister Sergei Ryabkov in Geneva on 10 January 2022

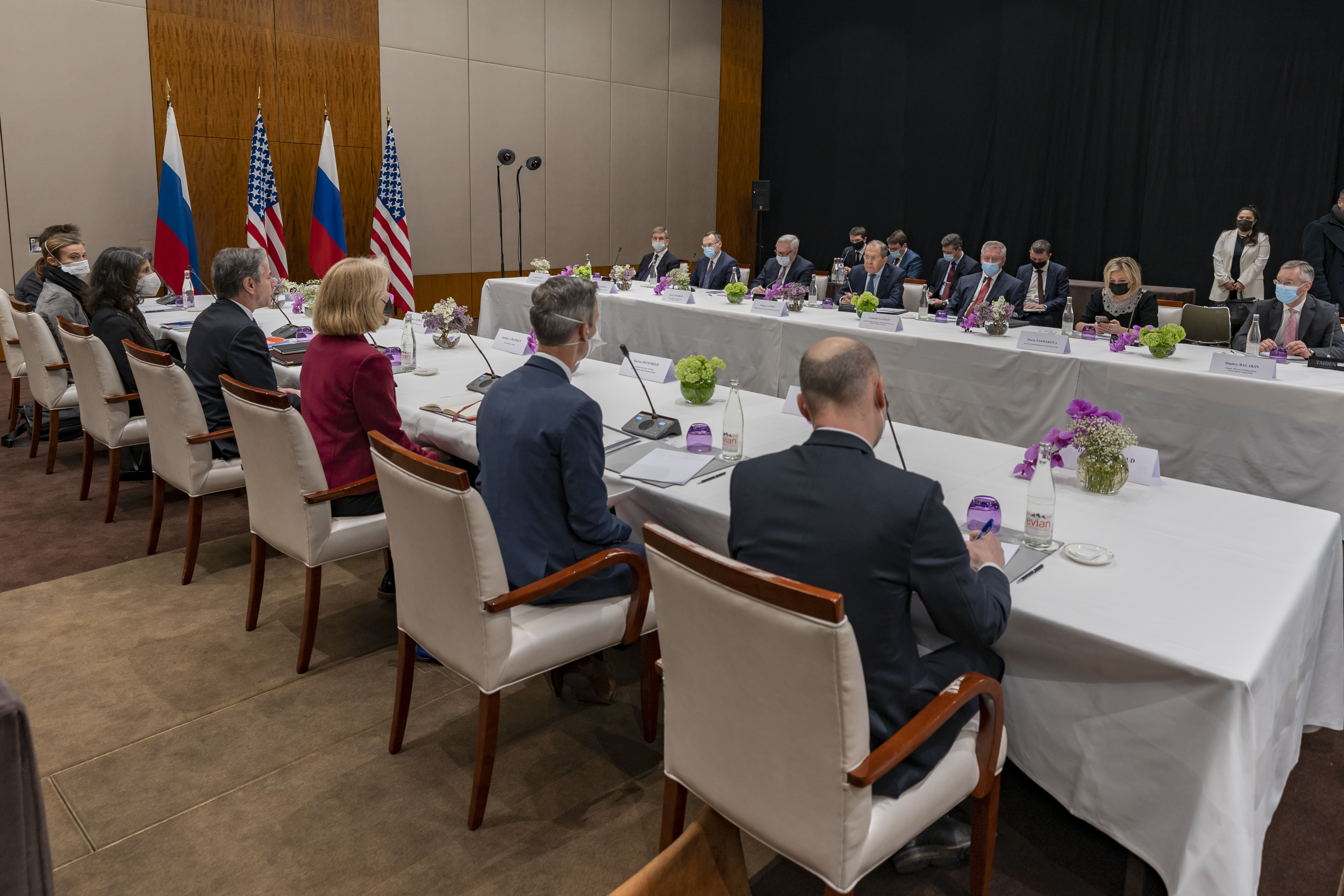
U.S. Secretary of State Antony Blinken meeting with Russian Foreign Minister Sergey Lavrov in Geneva on 21 January 2022

On 7 December 2021, U.S. president Joe Biden and Russian president Vladimir Putin talked via videoconference. One of the topics discussed was the crisis over Ukraine, the Russian side issuing a statement that said Putin highlighted the fact that it was "NATO that was undertaking dangerous attempts to develop Ukrainian territory and increase its potential along [Russia's] borders". He demanded "reliable, legal guarantees" that would preclude NATO from expanding its territory toward Russia or deploying its strike weapon systems in countries bordering Russia.

On 15 December 2021, Russia formally handed over to the U.S. its two draft treaties on security guarantees whereby the U.S. as well as NATO would, among other things, undertake not to deploy troops in ex-Soviet states that were not NATO members, rule out any further expansion of the Alliance eastward, undertake not to deploy any forces in other countries in addition to that which were deployed as of 27 May 1997, and refrain from conducting any military activity in Ukraine as well as in other states in eastern Europe, the South Caucasus and Central Asia.

Biden and Putin had a 50-minute phone call on 30 December 2021. In a White House statement released afterwards, on the call, Biden urged Putin to "de-escalate tensions with Ukraine". According to Putin's aide, Biden told Putin that the U.S. did not plan to deploy offensive weapons in Ukraine. Biden also warned that if Russia continued aggression against Ukraine, it would lead to "serious costs and consequences" such as the U.S. imposing additional economic sanctions on Russia, increasing U.S. military presence in the eastern members of NATO, and increased assistance to Ukraine. According to Putin's aide, Putin responded by saying that it would "cause a total severance of relations" between Russia and the U.S. as well as the West at large.

The following day, Russian foreign minister Sergey Lavrov addressed the question about what Russia expected in response to its "security guarantees" proposals by saying that "we will not allow anyone to drag out our initiatives in endless discussions. If a constructive response does not follow within a reasonable time and the West continues its aggressive course, Russia will be forced to take every necessary action to ensure a strategic balance and to eliminate unacceptable threats to our security."

On 10 January 2022, the US and Russia held bilateral talks in Geneva, whose purpose had been defined by the two sides as "to discuss concerns about their respective military activity and confront rising tensions over Ukraine". The talks were led by Russian Deputy Foreign Minister Sergei Ryabkov, and U.S. Deputy Secretary of State Wendy Sherman.

The Geneva meeting was followed by a meeting of the NATO–Russia Council in Brussels on 12 January that involved delegations from all thirty NATO countries and one from Russia to discuss (according to the official statement issued by NATO), "the situation in and around Ukraine, and the implications for European security". The Russian MoD statement following the meeting stated that Russia "brought Russian assessments of the current state in the field of Euro-security, and also gave explanations on the military aspects of the Russian draft agreement on security guarantees." The talks were judged by Russia to be unsuccessful. Following the meeting, NATO Secretary General Jens Stoltenberg said that, with respect to Ukraine's potential accession to NATO, all NATO Allies were "united on the core principle that each and every nation has the right to choose his own path" and "Russia doesn't have a veto on whether Ukraine can become a NATO member. [...] at the end of the day, it has to be NATO Allies and Ukraine that decides on membership."

On 21 January 2022, Lavrov and Blinken met in Geneva. Blinken noted afterwards that the meeting "was not a negotiation but a candid exchange of concerns and ideas". Following the meeting, Blinken said that the U.S. had made clear to Russia that its renewed invasion would "be met with swift, severe and a united response from the United States and our partners and allies."

The US delivered a formal written response to Russia's security demands on 26 January 2022. The response rejected Moscow's demand that NATO renounce its promise that Ukraine would be able to join NATO. Commenting on the content of the U.S. response, Blinken said that the document "include[d] concerns of the United States and our allies and partners about Russia's actions that undermine security, a principled and pragmatic evaluation of the concerns that Russia has raised, and our own proposals for areas where we may be able to find common ground."

On 1 February 2022, Putin said the U.S. response had failed to address Moscow's "three key demands", namely the non-expansion of NATO, refusal to deploy offensive weapon systems close to the Russian borders, and bringing back NATO's military infrastructure to the status quo of 1997. On 17 February, as the risk of Russian invasion of Ukraine was being assessed by the U.S. and NATO as very high, Russia handed a letter to the U.S. ambassador that blamed Washington for having ignored its main security demands.

=== United Nations Security Council ===
A UN Security Council meeting was convened on 31 January 2022 to discuss the ongoing crisis. Russia tried to block the meeting, but the request was rejected with ten votes for the meeting to go ahead, two against and three abstentions. No resolution was agreed at the meeting although the U.S. and Russia exchanged accusations during the debate. U.S. ambassador to the UN, Linda Thomas-Greenfield, accused Russia of "aggressive behavior", and posing a "clear threat to international peace and security". She said Russia had made the "largest military mobilization for decades in Europe", and was trying "to paint Ukraine and Western countries as the aggressors to fabricate a pretext for attack".

Russia's ambassador to the UN, Vasily Nebenzya, accused the West of "hysterics" and of "whipping up tensions" over Ukraine. He accused the U.S. of "stoking the conflict" and said the UNSC meeting was "an attempt to drive a wedge between Russia and Ukraine". According to him, Ukraine was not abiding by the Minsk Protocols of 2014 and 2015 to end the conflict with the separatists, and Western nations were "pumping Ukraine full of weapons" contrary to the Minsk Protocols. Nebenzya added that Ukraine's violation of the Minsk Protocols could end in the 'worst way'. Ukrainian permanent representative at the UN Sergiy Kyslytsya said Russia had deployed 112,000 troops near Ukraine's borders and in Crimea, with 18,000 deployed at sea off Ukraine's coast. China's permanent representative, Zhang Jun, said the meeting was counterproductive and "quiet diplomacy, not megaphone diplomacy" was needed.

Later, the 21 February intervention in the Donbas was widely condemned by the UN Security Council, and did not receive any support. Kenya's ambassador, Martin Kimani, compared Putin's move to colonialism and said "We must complete our recovery from the embers of dead empires in a way that does not plunge us back into new forms of domination and oppression." Another UN Security Council meeting was convened on 23–24 February 2022 meant to defuse the crisis; however, Russia launched its invasion of Ukraine during the meeting. Russia invaded while holding the presidency of the UN Security Council for February 2022, and has veto power as one of five permanent members.

=== International treaties and negotiation structures ===
On 15 December 2021, Russia proposed documents that it referred to as "draft treaties", which referred to multiple international agreements, including the Charter for European Security and the NATO–Russia Council (NRC). Responses from NATO and the U.S. in January 2022 referred to NRC, the Treaty on Conventional Armed Forces in Europe (CFE), the United States–Russia Strategic Stability Dialogue (SSD), the Helsinki Final Act, the Organization for Security and Co-operation in Europe (OSCE), the Normandy Format, and other treaties and forums.

Treaties and negotiation forums
| Name | Main parties | First signatures or date formed | Legal status | Discussed in | References |
|---|---|---|---|---|---|
| Budapest Memorandum on Security Assurances | Ukraine, Russia, United States, United Kingdom | 1994 | Non-binding | Jan 2022 U.S. response to Russia | |
| Charter for European Security | OSCE members | 1999 | Non-binding | Dec 2021 Russian draft for U.S.–Russia Agreement | |
| NATO–Russia Council (NRC) | NATO, Russia | 2002 | Informal forum | Dec 2021 Russian draft for Russia–NATO Treaty | |
| Normandy Format | France, Germany, Russia, Ukraine | 2014 | Informal forum | Jan 2022 U.S. response to Russia | |
| Trilateral Contact Group on Ukraine | Ukraine, Russia and OSCE | 2014 | Informal forum | Jan 2022 U.S. response to Russia | |
| United States–Russia Strategic Stability Dialogue (SSD) | U.S., Russia | 2021 | Informal forum | Jan 2022 U.S. response to Russia | |

On 4 March 2022, Russia informed Norway that it would be unable to attend Norway's Cold Response, a biennial exercise that involves 30,000 troops from 27 countries. (Note: "(70) No participating State will carry out a military activity subject to prior notification involving more than 40,000 troops or 900 battle tanks or 2,000 ACVs or 900 self-propelled and towed artillery pieces, mortars and multiple rocket launchers (100 mm calibre and above) unless it has been the object of a communication as defined above and unless it has been included in the annual calendar, not later than 15 November each year.")

=== Lavrov–EU correspondence ===
On the pan-European level, Lavrov sent separate letters to European Union (EU) and NATO countries on 30 January 2022, asking them "not to strengthen their security at the expense of the security of others" and demanding an individual reply from each. Even though the text repeatedly referred to the OSCE, not all OSCE members received the letters.

A few days later, on 3 February 2022, European Commission president Ursula von der Leyen and other EU leaders stated that a collective EU response to Lavrov's letter was forthcoming, coordinated with NATO. On 10 February, the EU High Representative Josep Borrell sent a response on behalf of all 27 EU member states, offering "to continue dialogue with Russia on ways to strengthen the security of all" and asking Russia to de-escalate by withdrawing troops from around Ukraine.

== See also ==
- 2008 Russo-Georgian diplomatic crisis
  - Russo-Georgian War
- 2022 Russian mobilisation
- Armenia–Azerbaijan border crisis
- Assassination attempts on Volodymyr Zelenskyy
- Baker-Gorbachev Pact
- International relations since 1989
- Outline of the Russo-Ukrainian war
- Prelude to the Iraq War
- Prelude to the 2026 Iran war
- Reactions to the 2021–2022 Russo-Ukrainian crisis
- Second Cold War
- Timeline of the prelude to the Russian invasion of Ukraine
- Ukrainian refugee crisis (2022–present)
