= Global Exchange of Military Information =

Function of the Organization for Security and Co-Operation in Europe

Global Exchange of Military Information is an arms control annual exchange of information sponsored by the Organization for Security and Co-Operation in Europe. Under this agreement, all participating states exchange information about all of their military forces throughout the world. This exchange differs from that under the Vienna Document in that it is not limited to forces in Europe, that is, between the Atlantic and the Urals. The information that is exchanged includes:

- Location and personnel strength of general staff.
- Command organizations, chain of command, location, and personnel strength.
- Total authorized personnel strength of armed forces.
- Total holdings of weapon systems by category and subcategory, and their locations.

This exchange is conducted annually in April and reflects holdings as of 1 January.

The Russian Federation continued submitting GEMI data even after the invasion and annexation of Crimea in 2014.
