= Confidence-building measures =

Actions taken to reduce fear of conflict

Confidence-building measures (CBMs) or confidence- and security-building measures (CSBMs) are actions taken to reduce fear of attack by both (or more) parties in a situation of conflict. The term is most often used in the context of armed conflict, but is similar in logic to that of trust and interpersonal communication used to reduce conflictual situations among human individuals.

== History ==
=== Embassies and people to people contacts ===
Confidence-building measures between sovereign states for many centuries included the existence of and increased activities by embassies, which are state institutions geographically located inside the territory of other states, staffed by people expected to have extremely good interpersonal skills who can explain and resolve misunderstandings due to differences in language and culture which are incorrectly perceived as threatening, or encourage local knowledge of a foreign culture by funding artistic and cultural activities.

A much more grassroots form of confidence building occurs directly between ordinary people of different states. Short visits by individual children or groups of children to another state, and longer visits (6–12 months) by secondary and tertiary students to another state, have widely been used in the European Union as one of the methods of decreasing the tensions which had earlier led to many centuries of inter-European wars, culminating in the first and second world wars.

=== Cold War ===
The use of confidence-building measures (CBMs) as an explicit security management approach emerged from attempts by the Cold War superpowers and their military alliances (the North Atlantic Treaty Organization and the Warsaw Pact), as well as the European neutral and non-aligned states, to avoid conventional or nuclear war by accident or miscalculation. The term appears to have been first used in United Nations General Assembly resolution 914 (x) in 1955, prompted by the U.S. "Open Skies" proposal. CBMs became a significant component of arms control during a series of negotiations and agreements produced by the Conference on Security and Co-operation in Europe (CSCE; which later become the Organization for Security and Cooperation in Europe, OSCE) of the early 1970s. CBMs were a major component of the Helsinki Final Act Document (August 1975), the Stockholm CSBM Document (September 1986), and the Vienna Document (November 1990) and its iterations of 1992, 1994, 1999, and 2011. Other CBMs during the Cold War included Latin American joint military manoeuvres and exchanges of military observers, with a meeting on 8 January 1984 of Central American states agreeing to set up a detailed registry of military installations, weapons and personnel and methods of direct communication; and the 1975 Sinai Interim Agreement between Israel and Egypt. There are also other historical instances of what appears to be confidence building prior to the Cold War and outside of the European context.

== Role of confidence-building measures ==
In international relations, the way that confidence-building measures are intended to reduce fear and suspicion (the positive feedbacks) is to make the different states' (or opposition groups') behaviour more predictable. This typically involves exchanging information and making it possible to verify this information, especially information regarding armed forces and military equipment. Here, "positive" and "negative" refer to the mathematical nature of the feedback; positive feedback leads to worsening intensity in a conflict, while negative feedback leads to de-escalation of the conflict, a "peace spiral" or Gradual Reduction in Tension (GRIT).

More in-depth modelling of peace and armed conflict situations as complex dynamical systems suggests that intractable long-term armed conflict can be interpreted as the result of the reduced dimensionality of a system, in which the system is changing but remains near an attractor that maintains the conflict. The existing negative and positive feedbacks prevent a change to a state of peace. Confidence-building measures can change the properties of the system, increasing its dimensionality, so that in the higher dimensional system, positive feedback loops to resolve the conflict are able to overcome the negative feedbacks that tend to maintain the conflict.

=== Validity of the model in the Internet era ===
If the feedback model assumed by the confidence-building measure mechanism is correct, then the rapidly developing improvement in communication between ordinary people by the internet should provide extremely robust, fast methods of information exchange and verification, as well as improved people-to-people contacts and general building of trust networks, reducing the intensity and frequency of wars. Evidence, however, suggests that the Internet is as likely to inflame opinion and increase conflict (or at least tensions) as individuals are exposed to significantly different points of view.

== Typology of confidence-building measures ==
Existing and proposed confidence-building measures in the context of arms control, also called confidence and security-building measures (CSBMs), can be categorized by three main types. Confidence building can also be viewed as an overall process, rather than a collection of individual measures. In a monograph distributed to the Conference on Disarmament in 1997, James Macintosh divides CSBMs into informational type (A), verification type (B) and constraint (C) measures.

=== Type A: Information, interaction, and communication measures ===
Informational and similar type measures include:

1. Information measures: measures requiring or encouraging the provision (exchange) of information about military forces, facilities, structures, and activities. Examples include: publication of defence information; weapon system and force structure information exchange; consultative commissions; publication of defence budget figures; and publication of weapon system development information.
2. Experience measures: measures requiring or encouraging the opportunity to interact with officials or experts from other countries. Examples include: military personnel exchanges; security expert exchanges; transnational secondments; joint military training and joint military exercises; and seminars discussing doctrine, strategy, and technology issues.
3. Communication measures: measures requiring or encouraging the creation and/or use of shared means of communication. Examples include: "hot lines" for the exchange of crisis-related information; joint crisis control centres; and "cool lines" for the regularized distribution of required and/or requested information.
4. Notification measures: measures requiring or encouraging the advance, accurate notification of specified military activities. Examples include: advance notification of exercises, force movements, and mobilizations - including associated information about forces involved.

=== Type B: Verification and observation facilitation measures ===
Verification and similar measures, such as those of the Treaty on Conventional Armed Forces in Europe, include:

1. Observation-of-movement conduct measures: measures requiring or encouraging the opportunity to observe specified military activities. Examples include: mandatory and optional invitations to observe specified activities (with information about the activity) and rules of conduct for observers and hosts.
2. General observation measures: measures requiring or encouraging the opportunity to engage in non-focused "looks" at relatively small and generally-specified sections of territory within which activities of interest and/or concern may be occurring or may have recently occurred. Examples include: Open Skies agreements.
3. Inspection measures: measures requiring or encouraging the opportunity to inspect constrained or limited military forces, facilities, structures, and activities. Examples include: special observers for sensitive movements and activities; on-site inspections of various forms; and the use of special tagging and tracking devices.
4. Monitoring measures: measures requiring or encouraging the opportunity to monitor constrained or limited military forces, facilities, structures, and activities, principally through the use of monitoring devices. Examples include: perimeter monitors; motion sensors for no-go areas; sensors for use in restricted access areas; and activity sensors.
5. Facilitation of verification measures: measures requiring or encouraging participants to facilitate and/or not interfere with agreed verification efforts. Examples include: agreement to not interfere with inspection and/or monitoring efforts and agreements specifying how verification efforts are to be assisted or facilitated.

=== Type C: Constraint measures ===
Types of limitations include:

1. Activity constraint measures: measures requiring or encouraging participants to avoid or limit specified types of provocative military activity. Examples include: no harassing activities such as "playing chicken" on the high seas; no harassing or provocative close encounters between military aircraft and/or military aircraft and naval or ground forces; and no harassing activities in airspace near territorial boundaries.
2. Deployment constraint measures: measures requiring or encouraging participants to avoid or limit the provocative stationing or positioning of military forces. Examples include: no threatening manoeuvres or equipment tests; no threatening deployments near sensitive areas (such as tanks near borders); equipment constraints such as no attack aircraft within range of a neighbour's rear area territory; manpower limits; and nuclear free zones.
3. Technology constraint measures: measures requiring or encouraging participants to avoid or limit the development and/or deployment of specified military technologies, including systems and subsystems, believed by participating states to have a destabilizing character or impact. Examples include: no replacement of deployed military equipment of certain types (typically tanks, heavily armoured combat vehicles, self-propelled artillery, combat aircraft, and combat helicopters) with new, more advanced and capable types; no modernization of deployed military equipment of certain specified types in certain key, well-defined respects; no training with new systems; no field testing of new designs; and no production of specified new systems and/or subsystems.

== Confidence building viewed as a process ==
An alternative analytic approach to understanding confidence building looks at broader process concepts rather than concentrating on specific measures.

Confidence building, according to the transformation view, is a distinct activity undertaken by policy makers with the minimum intention of improving some aspects of a traditionally antagonistic security relationship through security policy coordination and cooperation. It entails the comprehensive process of exploring, negotiating, and then implementing tailored measures, including those that promote interaction, information exchange, and constraint. It also entails the development and use of both formal and informal practices and principles associated with the cooperative development of CBMs. When conditions are supportive, the confidence building process can facilitate, focus, synchronize, amplify, and generally structure the potential for a significant positive transformation in the security relations of participating states. Confidence building in this view is a process that constitutes more than the sum of its parts.

When confidence building leads to the institutionalization of a collection of new rules and practices stipulating how participating states and non-state actors should cooperate and compete with each other in their security relationship, the restructured relationship can reduce the likelihood of armed conflict by redefining expectations of normal behaviour among participating states in a way that is more likely to handle conflict by non-military means.

== See also ==
- Appeasement
- Conflict resolution
- Confidence-building measures in South America
- Preventive diplomacy
