= Union Resolve 2022 =

February 2022 joint military exercises by Russia and Belarus

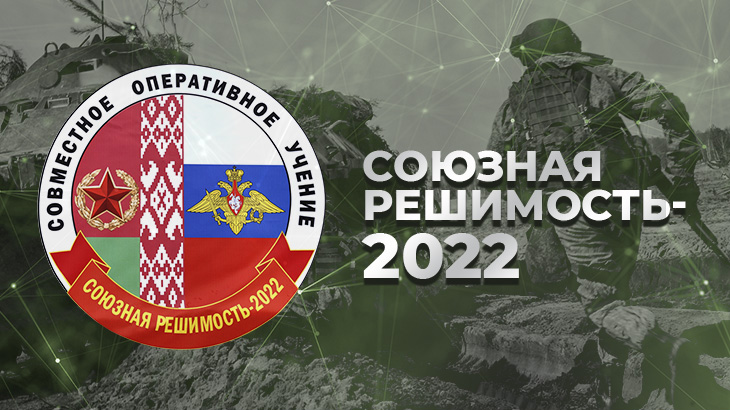
Union Resolve 2022

Union Resolve 2022 (Russian: Союзная решимость — 2022, romanized: Soyuznaya reshimost' — 2022) was a joint military exercise between the Armed Forces of the Russian Federation and the Republic of Belarus, which were held from February 10 to 20, 2022. The exercise is considered to be part of the prelude to the Russian invasion of Ukraine.

== See also ==
- Zametil 2022, Ukrainian military exercise within the same time frame
