= United States–Russia Strategic Stability Dialogue =

The United States–Russia Strategic Stability Dialogue (SSD) is a series of meetings and working groups, started in 2021, aiming to reduce the risk of nuclear war between the United States and Russia.

== Creation ==
The United States–Russia Strategic Stability Dialogue was created following a June 2021 meeting between United States (US) president Joe Biden and Russian president Vladimir Putin, aiming at reducing the risk of nuclear war. The two presidents stated that "a nuclear war cannot be won and must never be fought".

== Aims ==
The aims of the SSD are to prevent nuclear war by creating stability that prevents or reverses an arms race in nuclear weapon development, and to create stability that prevents or dampens crises in which nuclear weapons could be used. These aims tending towards nuclear disarmament included preparing a broader treaty than New START, which is legally binding through to 2026. Cybersecurity of nuclear weapons systems is among the issues to be covered.

== Structure ==
The SSD is planned to include plenary meetings and technical working groups.

== Meetings ==
The first plenary SSD meeting took place in Geneva on 28 July 2021. A second meeting, in September 2021, agreed to create a Principles and Objectives for Future Arms Control working group and a Capabilities and Actions with Strategic Effects working group. A third meeting was planned for December 2021 but did not take place.

An extraordinary meeting of the SSD was held between the US and Russian delegations in Geneva on 10 January 2022. Discussions included the issue of the location of missiles, including those in Europe, in a similar way to rules of the Intermediate-Range Nuclear Forces Treaty, from which the US withdrew in 2019. The talks also included issues related to the 2021–2022 Russo-Ukrainian crisis.

== Analysis ==
In October 2021, astrophysicist Robert J. Goldston recommended that the SSD cover the four different issues of limiting ballistic missile defence, eliminating intercontinental ballistic missiles based in underground missile silos, banning nuclear-armed intermediate-range ballistic missiles, and agreeing on a common policies on the use of nuclear bombs.
