= Zametil 2022 =

Ukrainian military exercise

Zametil 2022 (Ukrainian: Заметіль-2022, "Blizzard-2022") was a command and staff military exercise of the Armed Forces of Ukraine in February 2022, in preparation for a possible military attack by Russia, responding to the build-up of Russian military near the Ukrainian borders and the Belarus-Russia military exercise Union Resolve 2022.

Disguised as a military exercise, troops were dispersed from their permanent bases to defense positions ensuring that troops and equipment survived the initial attack on 24.02.2026.
