= Flag of the Organization for Security and Co-operation in Europe =

Official symbol used by the Organization for Security and Co-operation in Europe

Organization for Security and Co-operation in Europe
- Adopted: c. 2000
- Design: A white field charged with the logo of the OSCE

The flag of the Organization for Security and Co-operation in Europe is a flag used to represent the Organization for Security and Co-operation in Europe, an intergovernmental organisation with member states in Europe, Central Asia and North America.

== Design ==
The flag consists of a white field charged the logo of the organisation, i.e. four blue squares containing the lower-case letters "o", "s", "c" and "e". Variants also exist in the German and Russian languages.

=== Variants ===
German language variant

Russian language variant

Variant used by the Parliamentary Assembly

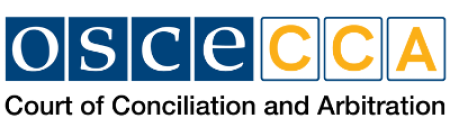
Variant used by the Court of Conciliation and Arbitration

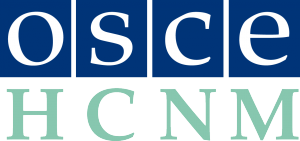
Variant used by the High Commissioner on National Minorities

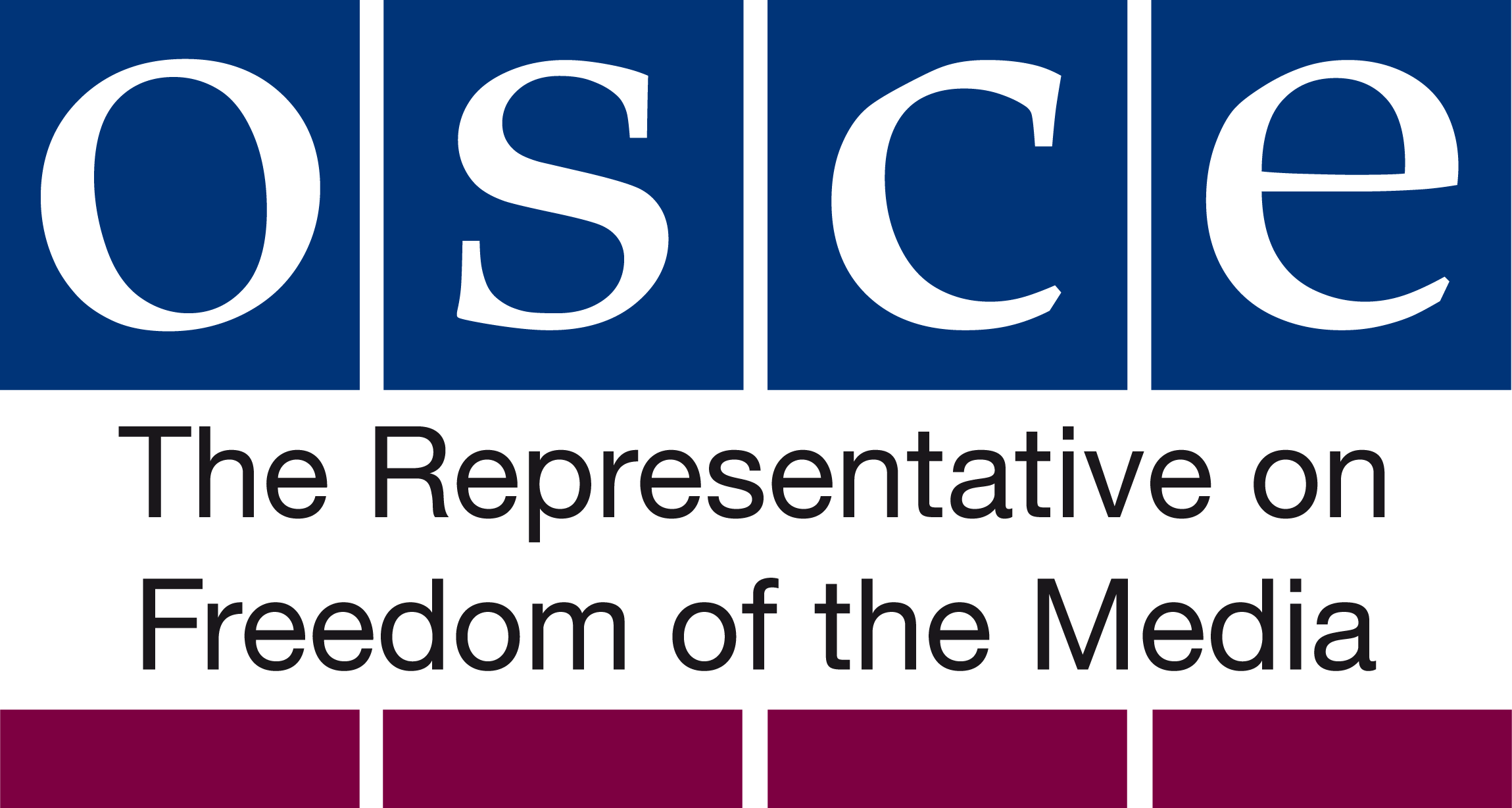
Variant used by OSCE Representative on Freedom of the Media

== Gallery ==
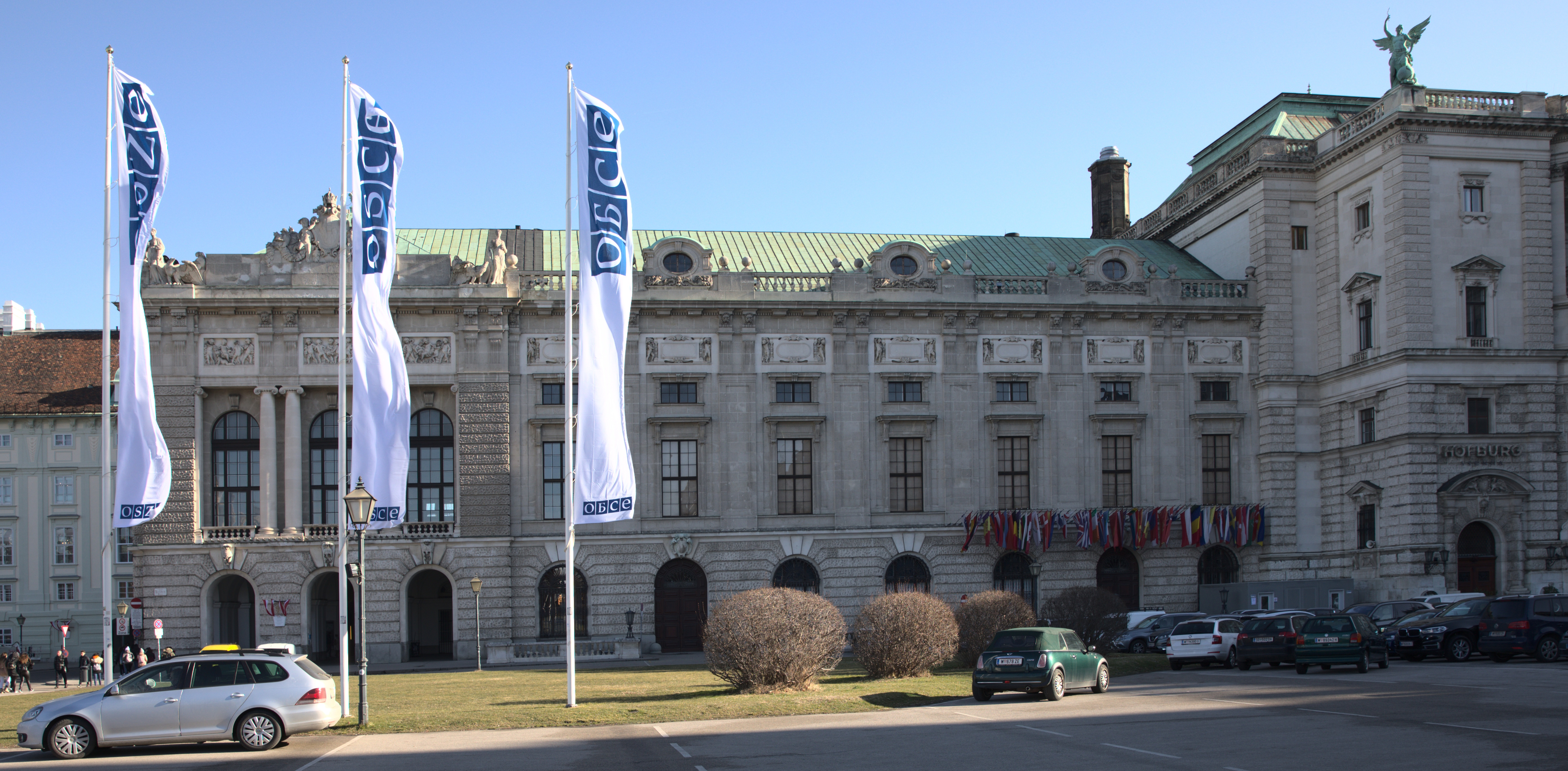
Banners flying at the OSCE headquarters at the Hofburg in Vienna

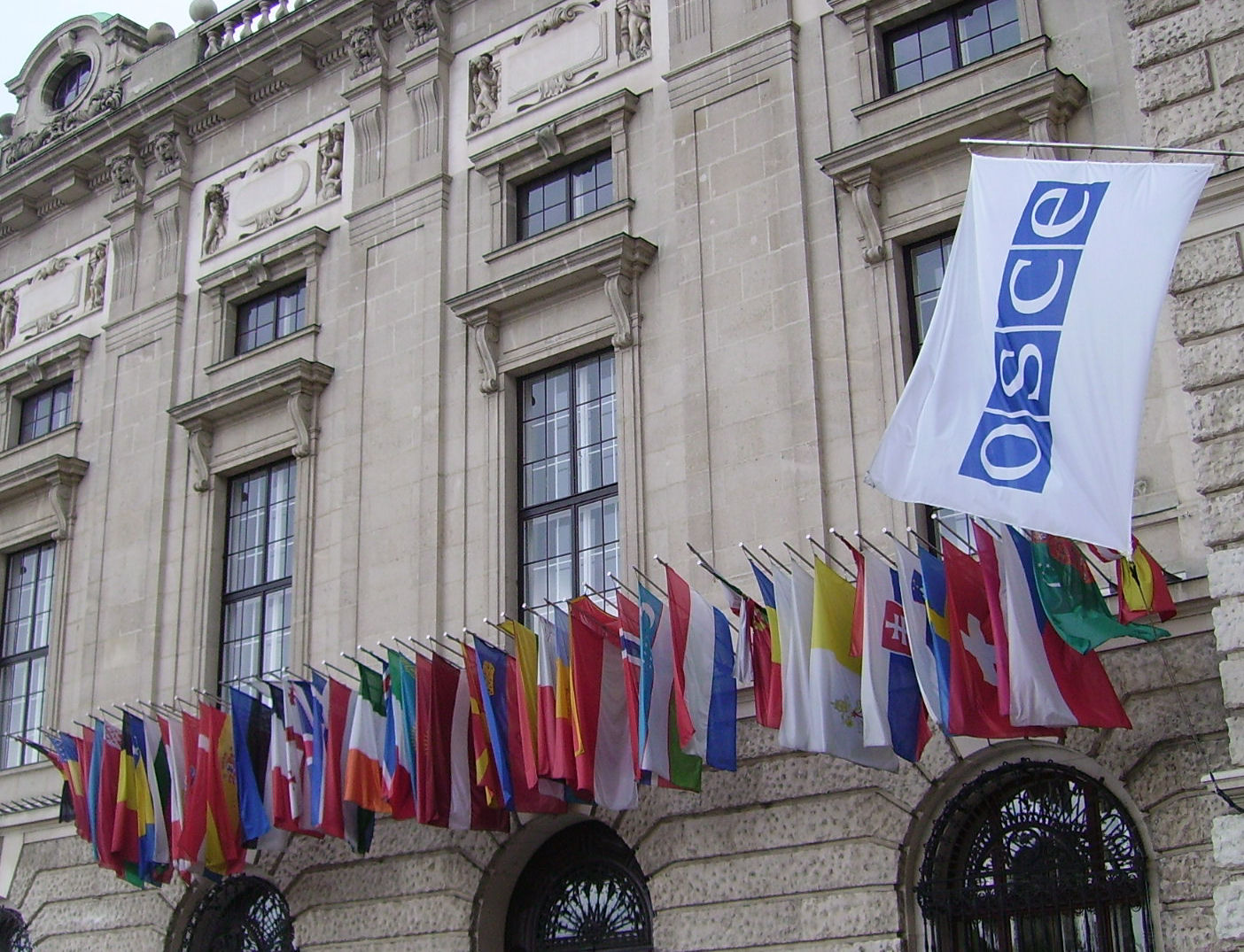
Flags of the OSCE and member states

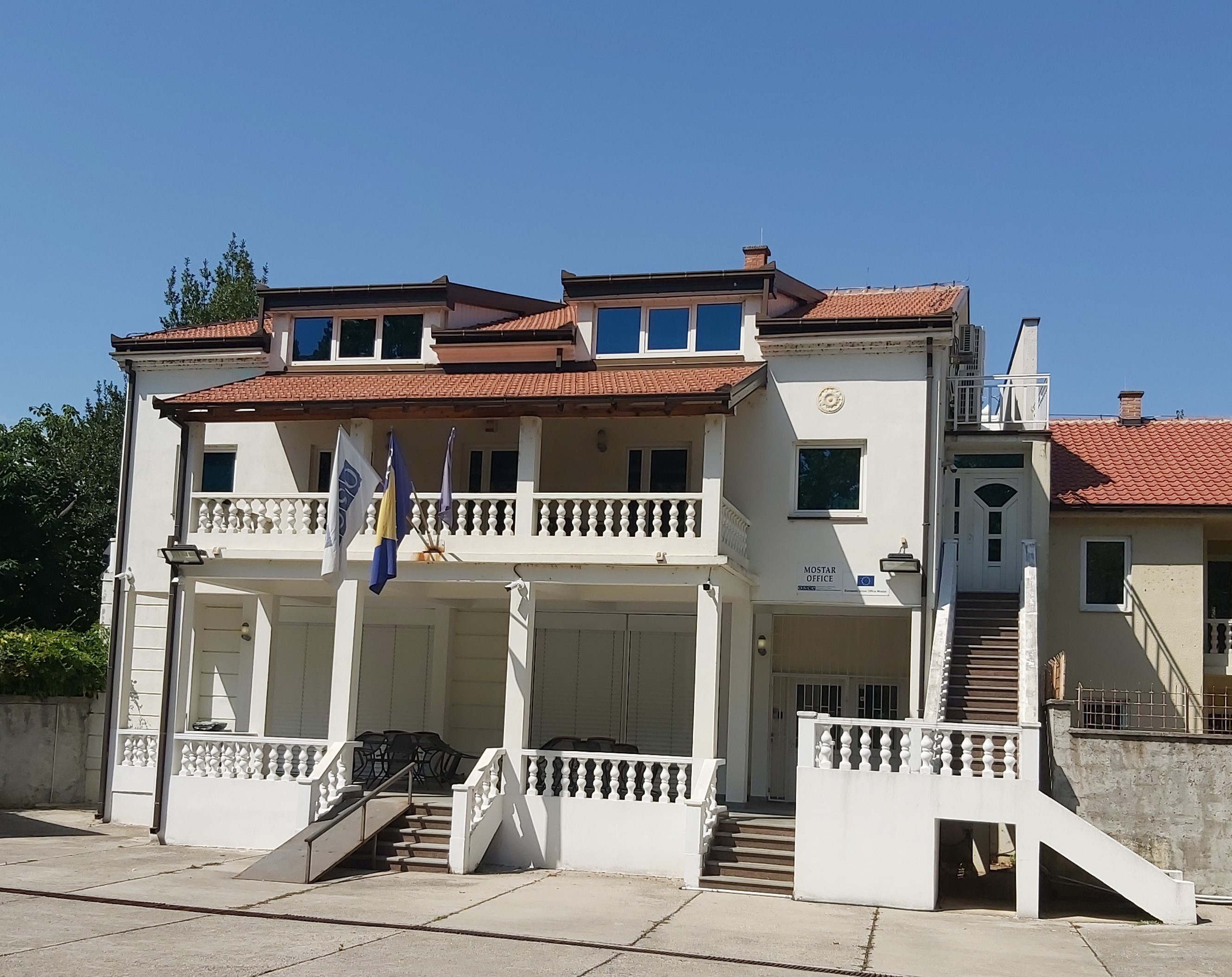
OSCE flag being flown at a field office in Mostar, Bosnia and Herzegovina
