= Integration and Development Centre for Information and Research =

Ukrainian non-governmental organization

The Integration and Development Centre for Information and Research or IDC (Ukrainian: Інформаційно-дослідницький центр "Інтеграція та розвиток", Russian: Информационно-исследовательский центр "Интеграция и развитие") is a non-governmental organization from Simferopol, Crimea, Ukraine, founded in 1997 (28 years ago). It aims to promote civil society, democracy, tolerance and intercultural relations in Crimea.

In 2009, the centre was chosen by an international jury led by the OSCE High Commissioner on National Minorities to receive the Max van der Stoel Award from the Ministry for Foreign Affairs of the Netherlands.
