= 1999 Istanbul summit =

Intergovernmental meeting

The 1999 Istanbul Summit was the 6th Organization for Security and Co-operation in Europe (OSCE) summit and was held in Istanbul, Turkey from November 18 until November 19, resulting in the adoption of the Istanbul Summit Declaration and the signing of the Charter for European Security. Also in Istanbul, 30 OSCE states signed the Agreement on the Adapted Conventional Armed Forces in Europe Treaty, which amended the 1990 Treaty on Conventional Armed Forces in Europe to reflect the changes since the end of the Cold War. There was a verbal clash between Russia and the West concerning NATO intervention in the Kosovo Conflict and the beginning of the Second Chechen War.

The Transnistria conflict, the Abkhaz–Georgian conflict and the Georgian–Ossetian conflict were also discussed.

== Russian forces in Moldova ==
Russia agreed to withdraw its 14th Army from Moldovan territory in an agreement signed 21 October 1994 and acknowledged in the December Budapest declaration of the Conference on Security and Co-operation in Europe. The OSCE expressed concern over the lack of progress in its 1996 Lisbon Document. At the 1999 OSCE summit, Russia again promised to withdraw its forces from Moldova (and from Georgia), this time with a firm commitment to a deadline of 31 December 2002 written into the summit documents. This did not happen.
