= Treaty on Conventional Armed Forces in Europe =

1990 treaty to limit the size of conventional militaries in Europe

- Signed: 19 November 1990
- Location: Paris, France
- Effective: 9 November 1992
- Condition: Ratification by NATO and Warsaw Pact member countries
- Replaced by: Adapted Conventional Armed Forces in Europe Treaty
- Expiry: No expiration
- Signatories: Bulgaria: Hungary; Poland; Romania; Soviet Union; Belgium; Canada; Denmark; France; Germany; Greece; Iceland; Italy; Luxembourg; Netherlands; Norway; Portugal; Spain; Turkey; United Kingdom; United States
- Parties: Armenia; Azerbaijan; Belarus (suspended in 2024); Bulgaria (suspended in 2023); Czech Republic (suspended in 2023); Georgia (suspended in 2023); Hungary (suspended in 2024); Kazakhstan (suspended in 2025); Moldova (suspended in 2024); Poland (suspended in 2024); Romania (suspended in 2023); Russia (suspended in 2007, withdrew in 2023); Slovakia (suspended in 2023); Ukraine (suspended in 2025); Belgium (suspended in 2024); Canada (suspended in 2023); Denmark (suspended in 2023); France (suspended in 2023); Germany (suspended in 2024); Greece (suspended in 2023); Iceland (suspended in 2024); Italy (suspended in 2023); Luxembourg (suspended in 2024); Netherlands (suspended in 2023); Norway (suspended in 2024); Portugal (suspended in 2024); Spain (suspended in 2024); Turkey (suspended in 2024); United Kingdom (suspended in 2023); United States (suspended in 2023)
- The Adapted CFE was intended to replace the 1990 CFE Treaty, but legally speaking it never entered into force because it was not ratified by NATO.

The original Treaty on Conventional Armed Forces in Europe (CFE) was negotiated and concluded during the last years of the Cold War and established comprehensive limits on key categories of conventional military equipment in Europe (from the Atlantic to the Urals) and mandated the destruction of excess weaponry. The treaty proposed equal limits for the two "groups of states-parties", the North Atlantic Treaty Organization (NATO) and the Warsaw Pact. In 1999, the Adapted CFE was signed to take in consideration the changed geopolitical realities and the disbanding of the Warsaw Pact, but NATO refused to ratify it, citing Russian failure to comply to the Istanbul Commitments. In 2007, Russia "suspended" its participation in the treaty, citing the US presence in Eastern Europe and NATO's refusal to ratify the Adapted CFE treaty. On 10 March 2015, citing NATO's alleged de facto breach of the Treaty, Russia formally announced it was "completely" halting its participation as of the next day. On 7 November 2023, Russia withdrew from the treaty, and in response the United States and its NATO allies suspended their participation in the treaty. Almost all other parties have since suspended their participation.

== History ==
=== Background ===
In 1972, US president Richard Nixon and Soviet General Secretary Leonid Brezhnev reached a compromise agreement to hold separate political and military negotiations. The Conference on Security and Cooperation in Europe (CSCE) would deal with political issues, and Mutual and Balanced Force Reductions (MBFR) with military issues. The CSCE resulted in 1975 in 35 nations signing the concluding document: the Helsinki Final Act. Negotiations for MBFR were stalled by the USSR in 1979 because of NATO's decision to deploy new intermediate-range nuclear weapons in Europe. In 1986, Soviet General Secretary Mikhail Gorbachev proposed in the context of MBFR negotiations to reduce ground and air forces, and to include conventional and nuclear weapons from the Atlantic to the Urals. This proposal was formalized later that year during a Warsaw Treaty meeting. NATO's North Atlantic Council of foreign ministers issued the Brussels Declaration on Conventional Arms Control, which called for two distinct sets of negotiations: one to build on the Confidence and Security-Building Measures (CSBM) results of the Stockholm Conference and the other to establish conventional stability in Europe through negotiations on conventional arms control from the Atlantic to the Urals (ATTU). In 1987, the Stockholm Document entered into force and for the first time provided a negotiated right to conduct on-site inspections of military forces in the field.

Informal talks between the 16 NATO and the 7 Warsaw Treaty nations began in Vienna on 17 February 1987 on a mandate for conventional negotiations in Europe, which would set out the treaty negotiating guidelines. Several months later, on 27 June, NATO presented a draft mandate during the 23-nation conference in Vienna. The mandate called for elimination of force disparities, capability for surprise attack, and large-scale offensive operations, and the establishment of an effective verification system. Meanwhile, in December the INF Treaty between the United States and the Soviet Union was signed, effectively allowing mutual inspections. During the May–June 1988 Moscow Summit, US President Ronald Reagan and General Secretary Gorbachev emphasized the importance of stability and security in Europe, specifically calling for data exchange, verification of these data, and then reductions. In December 1988, Gorbachev announced in the United Nations a unilateral withdrawal of 50,000 troops from Eastern Europe, and demobilization of 500,000 Soviet troops.

=== CFE negotiations ===
In January 1989, NATO and the Warsaw Treaty members produced the Mandate for the Negotiation on Conventional Armed Forces in Europe. The mandate set out objectives for the CFE Treaty and established negotiating principles, and formal negotiations began on 9 March 1989 in Vienna. When US President George H. W. Bush and France's President François Mitterrand met in May, Bush announced the acceptance of reductions of combat aircraft and helicopters. He also proposed a ceiling of 275,000 personnel stationed in Europe by the US and Soviet Union. Bush's proposal was formally adopted during the 1989 Brussels NATO summit and subsequently presented in Vienna.

In July, the 1989 Polish legislative election held in accord with the Polish Round Table Agreement resulted in the appointment on 24 August 1989 of the first non-communist Prime Minister, considered an effective end of communist rule in Poland, followed in November by the fall of the Berlin Wall in Germany. In the following months revolutions broke out in Hungary, Czechoslovakia, Romania, Bulgaria and Albania. Bush and Gorbachev agreed to speed up arms control and economic negotiations. Bush proposed even steeper reductions, and the Soviet Union negotiated and concluded troop withdrawal agreements with Warsaw Treaty states. The ensuing German reunification would lead to the Treaty on the Final Settlement with Respect to Germany linked to the CFE treaty by specifying that certain military limits imposed on Germany would come into force upon the conclusion of the CFE Treaty.

The text of the treaty was approved by the 22 negotiating states on 15 November 1990 in Vienna.

The Vienna Document on confidence- and security-building measures, also first adopted in 1990, and the CFE Treaty, were seen as parallel peace process components by the Organization for Security and Co-operation in Europe (OSCE).

=== 1990 signature ceremony in Paris ===
All members of the two blocs (NATO in blue, Warsaw Treaty in red) signed the CFE treaty in 1990.

The Treaty was signed in Paris on November 19, 1990 by 22 countries. These were divided into two groups:

- the then-16 NATO members: the United States, Canada, Denmark, France, Germany, Greece, Iceland, Italy, Luxembourg, the Netherlands, Norway, Portugal, Spain, Turkey, the United Kingdom, and Belgium.
- the then-six Warsaw Treaty states: Bulgaria, Czechoslovakia, Hungary, Poland, Romania, and the Soviet Union

=== Ratification ===
The CFE treaty members of 1992 differ from the signatories in 1990 due to the collapse of the Soviet Union and the split of Czechoslovakia.

The treaty entered into force on 9 November 1992. In 1991 the USSR and the Warsaw Treaty dissolved and Czechoslovakia was in the middle of splitting into the Czech Republic and Slovakia, which explains why the treaty was ratified by 30 rather than 22 states:

- The then-16 NATO members
- The eight former USSR republics that have territory west of the Urals. These former USSR republics include Armenia, Azerbaijan, Belarus, Georgia, Kazakhstan, Moldova, Russia, and Ukraine.
- the six former Warsaw Treaty members: Bulgaria, the Czech Republic and Slovakia, Hungary, Poland, Romania.

=== Military blocs reshuffle in Europe and former Soviet Union ===
In 1994, the Collective Security Treaty Organization (CSTO) was formed and currently includes Armenia, Belarus, Kazakhstan, Russia, as well as Kyrgyzstan and Tajikistan, though the latter two states did not join the treaty, while Russia suspended its participation in 2015. In September 2022, the lack of Russian support during the Armenia–Azerbaijan border clashes prompted a national debate in Armenia, as an increasing percentage of the population put into doubt whether it is beneficial to continue CSTO membership, calling for realignment of the state with NATO instead.

In contrast, most former non-USSR Warsaw Treaty members subsequently joined NATO, followed later by the Baltic states and the states of the former Yugoslavia (except Serbia, Kosovo and Bosnia and Herzegovina) which however did not join the treaty. Furthermore, the former Soviet Union republics of Georgia, Moldova, and Ukraine, also aspire to join.

Azerbaijan in turn balances between the blocs without joining any.

=== 1996 amendment ===
On 31 May 1996, the treaty was amended by the so-called flank agreement, which relaxed the restrictions for Russia and Ukraine in the flank region defined in Article V, subparagraph 1(A) of the treaty.

=== 2007–2015 partial suspension of Russian participation ===
On 14 July 2007, Vladimir Putin announced that Russia would suspend implementation of its Treaty obligations, effective after 150 days. Moscow continued to participate in the JCG, because it hoped that dialogue could lead to the creation of an effective, new conventional arms control regime in Europe.

In 2007 Russia specified steps that NATO could take to end the suspension. "These include [NATO] members cutting their arms allotments and further restricting temporary weapons deployments on each NATO member's territory. Russia also want[ed] constraints eliminated on how many forces it can deploy in its southern and northern flanks. Moreover, it is pressing NATO members to ratify a 1999 updated version of the accord, known as the Adapted CFE Treaty, and demanding that the four alliance members outside the original treaty, Estonia, Latvia, Lithuania, and Slovenia, join it."

=== 2015 indefinite total withdrawal of Russian participation ===
In March 2015, the Russian Federation announced that it had taken the decision to completely withdraw its participation in the Treaty. Russian diplomat Mikhail Ulyanov said Russia would be unlikely to return to compliance because the accord, "created when the Warsaw Pact was still in existence, is 'anachronistic' and 'absolutely out of sync with the present realities'".

=== 2023 Russia denounces TCAFE ===
On 7 November 2023 Russia denounced the TCAFE. On the same day in response NATO announced its members would suspend participation.

=== 2024 suspension of Greek participation ===
On 9 February 2024, Greece suspended its participation in the TCAFE.

=== 2024 suspension of Polish participation ===
On 29 March 2024, President Duda of Poland suspended his country's participation in the TCAFE. This had been foreseen by the NATO statement, and the vote in the Sejm.

=== 2024 suspension of Turkish participation ===
On 5 April 2024, Turkish president Recep Tayyip Erdoğan issued a presidential decree that suspended the Turkish participation in the treaty.

== Content ==
=== Arms ceilings ===
The CFE Treaty set equal ceilings for each bloc (NATO and the Warsaw Treaty Organization), from the Atlantic to the Urals, on key armaments essential for conducting surprise attacks and initiating large-scale offensive operations. Collectively, the treaty participants agreed that neither side could have more than:

- 20,000 tanks;
- 20,000 artillery pieces;
- 30,000 armored combat vehicles (ACVs);
- 6,800 combat aircraft; and
- 2,000 attack helicopters.

To further limit the readiness of armed forces, the treaty set equal ceilings on equipment that could be deployed with active units. Other ground equipment had to be place in designated permanent storage sites. The limits for equipment each side could have in active units were:

- 16,500 tanks;
- 17,000 artillery pieces; and
- 27,300 armored combat vehicles (ACVs);

The treaty further limited the proportion of armaments that could be held by any one country in Europe to about one-third of the total for all countries in Europe – the "sufficiency" rule.

All sea-based Naval forces were excluded from CFE Treaty accountability.

=== Regional arrangements ===
In addition to limits on the number of armaments in each category on each side, the treaty included regional limits intended to prevent destabilizing force concentrations of ground equipment.

=== Destruction ===
To meet required troop ceilings, equipment had to be destroyed or, if possible, converted to non-military purposes.

=== Verification ===
The treaty included unprecedented provisions for detailed information exchanges, on-site inspections, challenge inspections, and on-site monitoring of destruction. Treaty parties received an unlimited right to monitor the process of destruction. Satellite surveillance was used to verify placement and progress on destruction of large military equipment like vehicles and tanks.

=== Joint Consultative Group ===
Finally, the Treaty established in Vienna a body composed of all Treaty members, which was called the Joint Consultative Group (JCG), and which dealt with questions relating to compliance with the provisions of the Treaty. The group aimed to:

- Resolve ambiguities and differences in interpretation
- Consider measures that enhance the Treaty's viability and effectiveness
- Resolve technical questions
- Look into disputes that may arise from the Treaty's implementation

== Implementation ==
After the treaty entered into force, a 4-month baseline inspection period began. Twenty-five percent of the destruction had to be completed by the end of 1 year, 60% by the end of 2 years, and all destruction required by the treaty completed by the end of 3 years.

The principal accomplishment was the large-scale reduction or destruction of conventional military equipment in the Atlantic Ocean to the Ural Mountains (ATTU) region during the first 5 years the Treaty was in effect. By the end of the Treaty's reduction period in 1995, when equipment limits took effect, the 30 States Parties completed and verified by inspection the destruction or conversion of over 52,000 battle tanks, armored combat vehicles, artillery pieces, combat aircraft and attack helicopters. In addition, they have conducted/accepted over 4,000 intrusive on-site inspections of military units/installations, and of specified areas.

NATO mostly fulfilled its obligations by destroying its oldest equipment. Also, NATO members with newer equipment, such as the United States, agreed to transfer some of this equipment to allies with older equipment.

=== Compliance ===
==== NATO ====
In 2007, the United States' plans to create bases in Romania and Bulgaria constituted, according to Russia, a breach of the treaty. NATO officials disputed this and stated that the US bases were not intended as permanent and thus could not be seen as a breach. However, it was then reported that the agreements signed with both Romania and Bulgaria in 2006 specifically allowed for permanent bases under direct US control and The Washington Times also had obtained the confirmation of a senior United States official that the facilities were intended to be permanent.

==== Former Soviet republics ====
A June 1998 Clinton administration report stated that Russia, Ukraine, Belarus, Armenia and Azerbaijan were not in compliance with the CFE treaty. Violations ranged from holdings of treaty-limited equipment (TLE) in excess of CFE ceilings to denial of full access during treaty inspections. The report concluded that the compliance issues were not "militarily significant" and Russia and Ukraine, the former USSR republics with the largest holdings among the Eastern bloc, remained within their treaty limits.

In the run-up to the Organization for Security and Co-operation in Europe's (OSCE) November 1999 Istanbul summit, NATO members perceived three treaty compliance problems. First of all, the continuing existence of Russian equipment holdings in the "flank" region (i.e. Russia's North Caucasus Military District) were in excess of agreed treaty limits. Secondly, the Russian military presence in Georgia was beyond the level authorised by the Georgian authorities. Thirdly, the Russian military presence in Moldova lacked the explicit consent of the Moldovan authorities. During the summit, 30 OSCE members signed the adapted CFE treaty and Russia assumed an obligation to withdraw from the Republic of Moldova, reduce her equipment levels in Georgia and agree with the Georgian authorities on the modalities and duration of the Russian forces stationed on the territory of Georgia, and reduce their forces in the flanks to the agreed levels of the Adapted CFE Treaty. These agreements became known as the "Istanbul Commitments" and were contained in 14 Annexes to the CFE Final Act and within the 1999 Istanbul Summit Declaration. NATO members however refused to ratify the treaty as long as Russia refused, as they saw it, to completely withdraw its troops from Moldovan and Georgian soil. (Note: Most of the Russian troops present were actually in the process of withdrawing from Georgia (see Russian Group of Forces of the Transcaucasus) at the time, though the then current agreements would have left Russian troops in Gudauta in Abkhazia, and with peacekeeping forces in South Ossetia and the Abkhaz/Georgian boundary line.) While Russia partially withdrew troops and equipment from Georgia and Moldova, it did not do so completely as requested by NATO.

===== South Caucasus =====
According to a 2019 report, Azerbaijan continues to significantly violate the treaty. In its data as of 1 January 2018, Azerbaijan declared equipment totals that exceeded its overall limits by over 900 pieces of Treaty-Limited Equipment:

- over 300 battle tanks in excess of Azerbaijan's limit of 220 battle tanks, surpassing 136% of the limit,
- over 160 armored combat vehicles (ACV) in excess of Azerbaijan's limit of 220 ACVs, surpassing 72% of the limit,
- over 670 artillery pieces in excess of Azerbaijan's limit of 285 artillery pieces surpassing 235% of the limit,
- over 5 attack helicopters in excess of Azerbaijan's limit of 50 attack helicopters surpassing 10% of the limit.

In May 2019, Armenia dismantled and decommissioned 21 armored combat vehicles in accordance with the requirements of treaty.

== Follow-up agreements ==
=== Concluding Act of the Negotiation on Personnel Strength of Conventional Armed Forces in Europe (CFE-1A) ===
CFE-1A negotiations began shortly after the original CFE Treaty was signed in 1990. CFE-1A was unlike the original CFE treaty not a legally binding treaty, but a political commitment that simultaneously came into force with the CFE treaty and served as a follow-up agreement. The commitment was that all signatories of the CFE Treaty would undertake steps to improve further confidence and security in the ATTU region. CFE-1A committed the 30 members of the treaty to establish manpower limits and, if deemed necessary, to reduce the existing manpower levels within the CFE area of application to reach these limits. The United States was limited under this commitment to have no more than 250,000 troops in the area of application. As an additional source of security assurance, the CFE-1A agreement required the parties to provide advanced notification of any increases made to the force levels. The compliance with the CFE-1A agreement by a member was evaluated during on-site inspections conducted under the CFE Treaty.

=== Agreement on Adaptation of the Treaty on Conventional Armed Forces in Europe (CFE-II) ===
The Agreement on Adaptation of the Treaty on Conventional Armed Forces in Europe (also known as the adapted CFE treaty) was a revision of the original treaty and was signed during the November 1999 Istanbul summit and took into account the different geopolitical situation of the post-Cold War era by setting national instead of bloc-based limits on conventional armed forces. NATO members refused however to ratify the treaty so long as Russia refused to completely withdraw its troops from Moldovan and Georgian soil. While Russia partially withdrew troops and equipment from Georgia and Moldova, it did not do so completely as demanded by NATO. The linkage between the ratification of the adapted treaty and the complete withdrawal was a political decision made by NATO members based on fundamental principles of international law pertaining to the territorial integrity of sovereign states.

== 2007 suspension by the Russian Federation ==
After the Russian Federation was not willing to support the US missile defense plans in Europe, Russian President Vladimir Putin called for "moratorium" on the treaty in his address on 26 April 2007. Then he raised most of his points for rewriting the treaty during the Extraordinary Conference of States Parties to the Treaty on Conventional Forces in Europe, held in Vienna on 11–15 June at Russia's initiative. As his requests were not met during this conference, Putin issued a decree intended to suspend the observance of its treaty obligations on 14 July 2007, effective 150 days later, stating that it was the result of "extraordinary circumstances ... which affect the security of the Russian Federation and require immediate measures", and notified NATO and its members. The suspension applies to the original CFE treaty, as well as to the follow-up agreements.

=== Motives ===
An explanatory document from Russia's presidential administration outlined several reasons for its original suspension of compliance in 2007. First of all, Russia considered the linkage between the adapted treaty ratification and the withdrawal of troops from Georgia and Moldova as "illegitimate" and "invented". Russia also considered the troop-withdrawal issue a bilateral Russia–Georgia and Russia–Moldova issue, not a NATO–Russia issue. Secondly, the three Baltic states, which border Russia unlike the rest of NATO (excluding Poland and Norway), were not covered under the original CFE treaty as they were still occupied by the Soviet Union when the treaty was signed. Also, the Baltic states like all NATO members did not ratify the adapted CFE treaty. Russia's request for a ratification and accession of the Baltic states to a ratified treaty was not fulfilled.

Thirdly, Russia emphasized that NATO's 1999 and 2004 enlargements increased the alliance's equipment above the treaty limits. Consequently, Russia demanded a "compensatory lowering" of overall NATO numerical ceilings on such equipment. Fourthly, Russia mentioned that the then planned basing of U.S. military units in Romania and Bulgaria "negatively affects" those countries' compliance with the CFE Treaty's force ceilings. Fifthly, the document demanded a "removal" of the flank (i.e., North Caucasian) ceilings on Russian forces by a "political decision" between NATO and Russia, ostensibly to "compensate" Russia for the alliance's enlargement. Sixthly, Russia wanted to re-negotiate and "modernize" the 1999–adapted CFE treaty as soon as it was brought into force. Russia's position was that it would proceed unilaterally to suspend the treaty's validity unless NATO countries brought the updated version into force by 1 July 2008, or at least complied with its terms on a temporary basis, pending a re-negotiation of the treaty.

Most likely, but not mentioned in Russia's explanatory document, the above-mentioned "extraordinary circumstances" referred to the US plans for a missile defense complex in Poland, with a radar component in the Czech Republic. (Note: These US plans would not have been possible without the 2002 unilateral withdrawal from the Anti-Ballistic Missile Treaty by the US as this treaty prevented the establishment of new anti-missile defenses sites. As Russia saw it, the CFE treaty could thus become (after the ABM treaty) the second major Cold War treaty that was suspended.) Another likely reason is that NATO members refused to ratify the Adapted CFE Treaty due to the continuing presence of several hundred Russian troops in Moldova—something they considered as a violation of the obligations Russia assumed during the 1999 Istanbul summit. However, there was no legal connection between the Adapted CFE treaty and the Russian withdrawal from Georgia and Moldova. The linkage between these two security issues was a decision made by NATO member states to protest against the Second Chechen War and was used as a reason not to ratify the treaty. Russia never accepted this decision—a decision also made six months after the Istanbul summit. Russia also considered the original CFE treaty to be outdated and strategically flawed as it did not take into account the dissolutions of the Warsaw Treaty or the Soviet Union.

In Russia, even Vladimir Ryzhkov, an opposition leader and an independent member of the Duma, agreed that Russia had been forced to respond. However, he also speculated that Putin's suspension by decree was "primarily an election-year message to the country: 'Your leader won't budge, no matter who formally becomes next President'."

=== Reactions ===
NATO immediately expressed regret over Russia's decision to suspend the treaty, describing it as "a step in the wrong direction", but hoped to engage Moscow in what was described as constructive talks on this issue. The United States along with European states such as Germany, Poland and Romania also expressed their disappointment. Collective Security Treaty Organisation (CSTO) General Secretary Nikolai Bordyuzha and former Soviet president Mikhail Gorbachev expressed support for Putin's decree. On 25 November 2011, the UK stopped sharing military data with Russia.

The Russian Foreign Ministry also said that the consequences of the suspension would be the halting of inspections and verifications of its military sites by NATO countries and that it would no longer have the obligation to limit the number of its conventional weapons. In practice, Russia had already halted such verification visits in June 2007 after an extraordinary CFE treaty conference held in Vienna turned a deaf ear to Russia's complaints. Consequently, military delegations from Bulgaria and Hungary had been denied entry to Russian military units.

Yuri Zarakhovich speculated in Time that the above-mentioned "immediate measures" would be a build-up of its forces in areas bordering NATO eastern members, in particular Poland and the Baltic states. Time further speculated at the time that other measures could include troop buildups along southern borders in the Caucasus, new pressures on Ukraine to maintain the Russian Black Sea Fleet in the Crimea beyond the (then planned) 2017 withdrawal deadline, and a refusal to leave Moldova.

== See also ==
- Budapest Memorandum on Security Assurances
- Helsinki Accords
