= Christophe Kamp =

Dutch diplomat

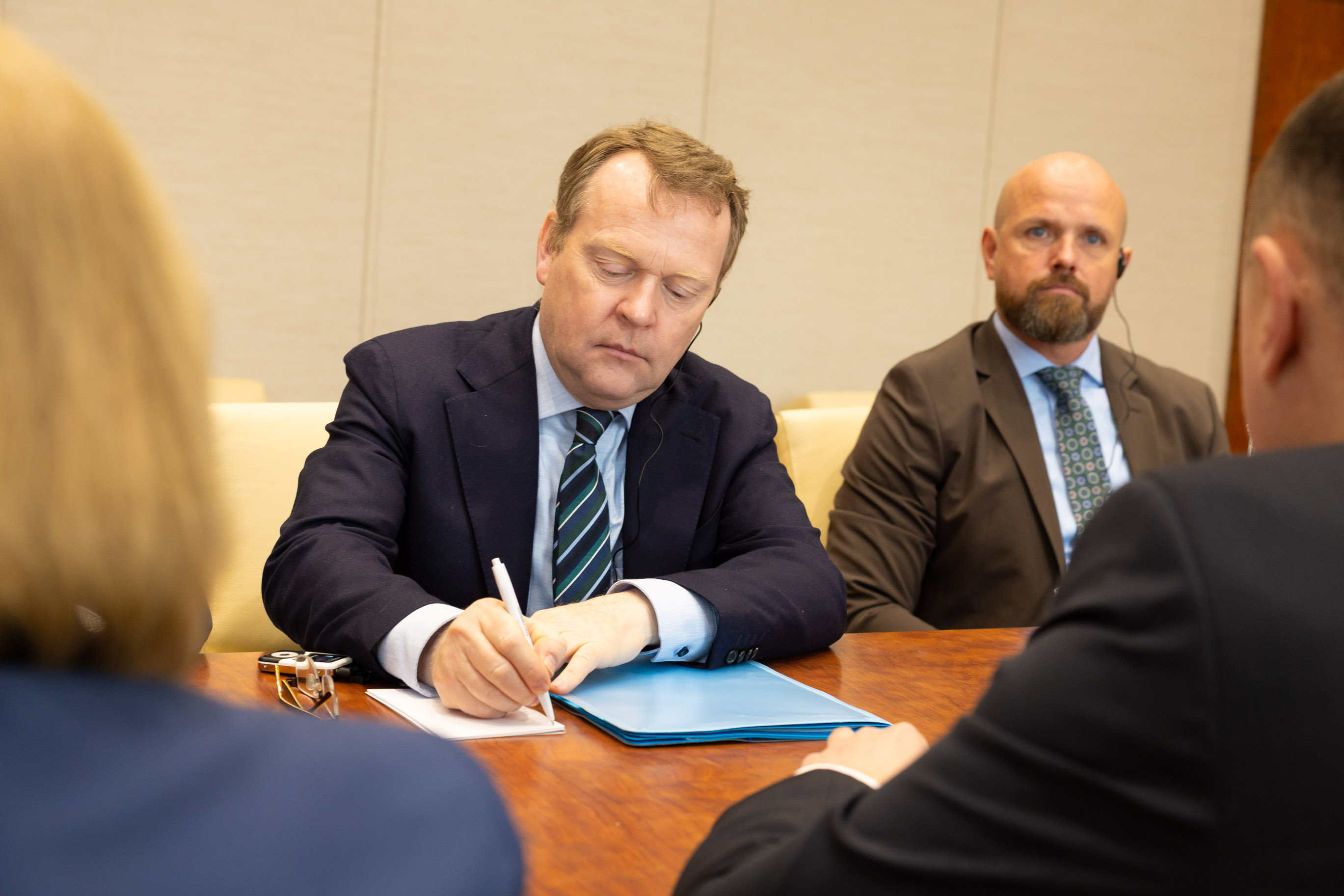
Christophe Kamp.jpg

Christophe Kamp is a Dutch diplomat who has served as the seventh High Commissioner on National Minorities (HCNM) of the Organization for Security and Co-operation in Europe (OSCE) since December 2024.

== Early life and education ==
Kamp was born in Amsterdam in 1969.

He has a Masters in political science from Leiden University and a Masters in public administration from the Harvard Kennedy School.

== Career ==
Kamp worked at the United Nations Department of Political and Peacebuilding Affairs at New York and the UN Human Rights Field Operation in Rwanda before becoming a part of the foreign department of the Netherlands in 2001.

Other positions before this also include the Permanent Representative of the Netherlands to the OSCE, Deputy Permanent Representative of the EU to the OSCE and spokesperson for the Netherlands Foreign Minister.
