= Organization for Security and Co-operation in Europe =

Security-oriented intergovernmental organization

- Flag Logo

- Secretariat: Vienna, Austria
- Official languages: English, French, German, Italian, Russian, Spanish
- Type: Intergovernmental organization with no legal personality
- Membership: 57 participating countries 11 partners for co-operation

Leaders
  - Chairman-in-Office: Ignazio Cassis
  - Office for Democratic Institutions and Human Rights: Maria Telalian
  - Representative on Freedom of the Media: Jan Braathu
  - High Commissioner on National Minorities: Christophe Kamp
  - Secretary General: Feridun Sinirlioğlu

Establishment
  - As the Conference on Security and Co-operation in Europe: July 1973
  - Helsinki Accords: 30 July – 1 August 1975
  - Paris Charter: 21 November 1990
  - Renamed OSCE: 1 January 1995

Area
  - Total: 55,511,860 km^{2} (21,433,250 sq mi)

Population
  - 2025 estimate: 1,314,210,638 (3rd)
  - Density: 25/km^{2} (64.7/sq mi)
- GDP (nominal): 2025 estimate
  - Total: US$63.316 trillion
  - Per capita: US$48,179
- Website osce.org

The Organization for Security and Co-operation in Europe (OSCE) is a regional security-oriented intergovernmental organization comprising member states in Europe, North America, and Asia. Its mandate includes issues such as arms control, the promotion of human rights, freedom of the press, and free and fair elections. It employs around 3,460 people, mostly in its field operations but also in its secretariat in Vienna, Austria, and its institutions. It has observer status at the United Nations.

The OSCE had its origins in 1975, when—amidst the Cold War—its predecessors came together to create a forum for discussion between the Western Bloc and the Eastern Bloc. Most of its 57 participating countries are in Europe, but with some members in Asia or in North America. The participating countries comprise approximately 55.4% of the land area of the Northern Hemisphere.

The OSCE is concerned with early warning, conflict prevention, crisis management and post-conflict rehabilitation.

== History ==
=== Roots ===
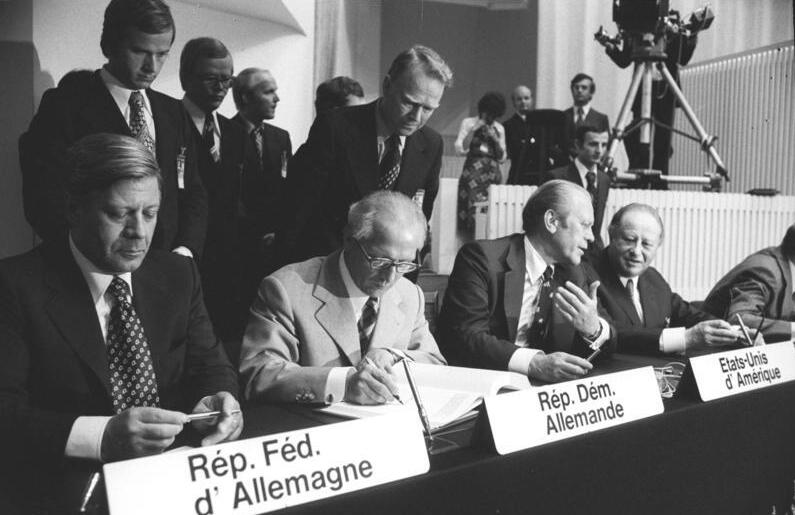
Helmut Schmidt, Erich Honecker, Gerald Ford and Bruno Kreisky at the 1975 CSCE summit in Helsinki, Finland

The Organization has its roots in the 1975 Conference on Security and Co-operation in Europe (CSCE). Talks had been mooted about a European security grouping since the 1950s but the Cold War prevented any substantial progress until the talks at Dipoli in Espoo began in November 1972. These talks were held at the suggestion of the Soviet Union which wished to use the talks to maintain its control over the communist states in Eastern Europe, and President of Finland Urho Kekkonen hosted them in order to bolster his policy of neutrality. Western Europe, however, saw these talks as a way to reduce the tension in the region, furthering economic cooperation and obtaining humanitarian improvements for the populations of the communist bloc.

The recommendations of the talks, in the form of "The Blue Book", gave the practical foundations for a three-stage conference called the "Helsinki process". The CSCE opened in Helsinki on 3 July 1973 with 35 states sending representatives. Stage I took only five days to agree to follow the Blue Book. Stage II was the main working phase and was conducted in Geneva from 18 September 1973 until 21 July 1975.

The result of Stage II was the Helsinki Final Act. This was signed by the 35 participating states during Stage III, which took place in Finlandia Hall between 30 July – 1 August 1975. It was opened by the Holy See's diplomat Cardinal Agostino Casaroli, who was the chairman of the conference.

The concepts of improving relations and implementing the act were developed over a series of follow-up meetings, with major gatherings in Belgrade (4 October 1977 – 8 March 1978), Madrid (11 November 1980 – 9 September 1983), and Vienna (4 November 1986 – 19 January 1989).

The Copenhagen commitment was written "to ensure that individuals are permitted to exercise their rights to peaceful assembly and freedom of association, including the right to form, join and participate effectively in non-governmental organizations, which seek the promotion and protection of human rights and fundamental freedoms."

The Moscow Mechanism was agreed in 1991.

=== CSCE becomes OSCE ===
The fall of the Soviet Union required a change of role for the CSCE. The Charter of Paris for a New Europe, signed on 21 November 1990, marked the beginning of this change. The process was capped by the renaming of the CSCE as the OSCE on 1 January 1995, in accordance with the results of a conference held in Budapest in 1994. The OSCE now had a formal secretariat, a Senior Council, a Parliamentary Assembly, a Conflict Prevention Centre, and an Office for Free Elections, which later became the Office for Democratic Institutions and Human Rights.

In December 1996, the "Lisbon Declaration on a Common and Comprehensive Security Model for Europe for the Twenty-First Century" affirmed the universal and indivisible nature of security on the European continent.

In Istanbul on 19 November 1999, the OSCE ended a two-day summit by calling for a political settlement in Chechnya and adopting a Charter for European Security.

Through its Office for Democratic Institutions and Human Rights (ODIHR), the OSCE observes and assesses elections in its member states, in order to support fair and transparent democratic processes, in keeping with the mutual standards to which the organization is committed; between 1994 and 2004 the OSCE sent teams of observers to monitor more than 150 elections, typically focusing on elections in emerging democracies. In 2004, at the invitation of the United States Government, the ODIHR deployed an assessment mission, made up of participants from six OSCE member states, which observed that year's US presidential election and produced a report. It was the first time that a US presidential election was the subject of OSCE monitoring, although the organization had previously monitored state-level American elections in Florida and California, in 2002 and 2003.

==== Criticism of OSCE ====
Members of OSCE have criticized the organization for being in a position where Russia, and sometimes Belarus, can veto all OSCE decisions; Moscow has, for a number of years, not allowed the approval of the organization's budget, the organization of official OSCE events or the extension of missions. In November 2023, Russia and Belarus vetoed the appointment of Estonia as chairman for 2024.

=== OSCE missions and operations ===
==== 1992 Georgia Mission ====
The OSCE Mission to Georgia was established in November 1992 with its headquarters in the capital Tbilisi. The Mission's mandate expired on 31 December 2008. Between these dates it was powerless to control the outbreak of the August 2008 Russo-Georgian War.

==== 1993 Mission to Moldova ====
The objective of the mission to Moldova is to facilitate a comprehensive and lasting political settlement of the Transnistria conflict in all its aspects, strengthening the independence, sovereignty and territorial integrity of the Republic of Moldova within its internationally recognized borders with a special status for Transnistria.

OSCE promoted a 5+2 format as a diplomatic negotiation platform, which began in 2005, suspended by Russia and Transnistria in 2006 until it started again in 2012, before making slow progress over the next ten years. The process stopped following the 2022 Russian invasion of Ukraine as two of the parties were then at war with each other.

In December 2022 Russia blocked the renewal of the annual mandate by limiting it to a six-month period, repeated again in June 2023 to another six-month period.

==== 1995 Mission to Bosnia and Herzegovina ====
The Bosnian War concluded in 1995 with the Dayton Agreement with the ongoing OSCE Mission being mandated to help secure lasting peace and therefore to build a stable, secure, and democratic state through building sustainable democratic institutions, strengthening good governance and human rights principles, and supporting the development of a multi-national and multi-ethnic democratic society.

==== 1998 Kosovo Verification Mission ====
The OSCE Kosovo Verification Mission was authorized by the OSCE Permanent Council in October 1998, and shuttered in June 1999 amidst a lack of progress towards a political settlement (including "violent attacks... perpetrated by both sides") between the Milosevic regime and other belligerents.

The 1999 OSCE Mission in Kosovo was then later authorized to "take the lead role in matters relating to institution- and democracy-building and human rights."

The OSCE's refusal to police events surrounding the 2008 Kosovo declaration of independence still rankles in Russia.

==== 2001 Mission to Macedonia ====
The ongoing Mission to Macedonia is monitoring and supporting the implementation of the Ohrid Framework Agreement that put an end to the 2001 armed conflict in North Macedonia.

==== 2001 Mission to Serbia ====
The current mission to Serbia started after Slobodan Milošević lost his power as President of Serbia and Montenegro in 2000. The mission was mandated to assist the authorities and civil society with democratic development and human rights protection, including the rights of persons belonging to national minorities. To promote democratization, tolerance and the rule of law.

==== 2006 Mission to Montenegro ====
The current mission began with the 2006 Montenegrin independence referendum, monitored by OSCE, with a mandate being granted with the objective of assisting and promoting the implementation of OSCE principles and commitments including the politico-military and human aspects of security and stability.

==== 2012 Texas election ====
Before the U.S. presidential elections of November 2012, the OSCE announced its intention to send electoral observers to Texas and to other U.S. states. This prompted the Attorney General of Texas Greg Abbott to send letters to U.S. Secretary of State Hillary Clinton and to the OSCE, threatening to arrest OSCE officials if they should enter electoral premises in Texas and break Texas law. In reply, the U.S. Department of State stated that OSCE observers enjoyed immunities. In the event, no incidents between OSCE and Texas authorities were recorded during the elections.

==== 2017 Turkey constitutional referendum ====
In April 2017, Turkish President Recep Tayyip Erdoğan criticized the OSCE for reporting that opposition "No" campaigners in the Turkish constitutional referendum had faced bans, police interventions and arrests. Erdoğan said: "Now the Organization for Security and Cooperation in Europe says if the result is 'yes', that means there are a lot of problems. Who are you? First of all, you should know your place. This is not your duty."

==== OSCE involvement in Ukraine (2014–2021) ====
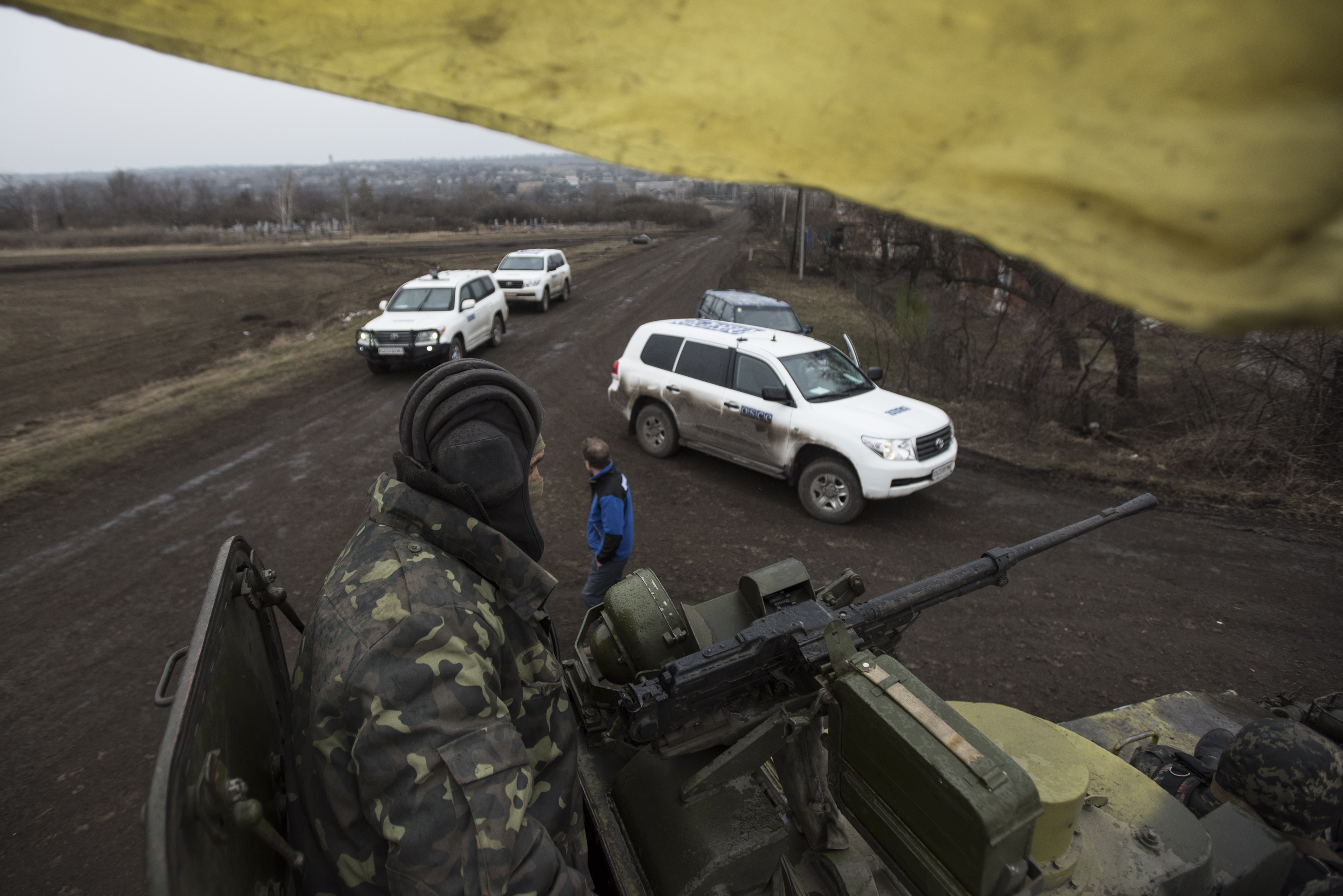
OSCE SMM monitoring the movement of heavy weaponry in eastern Ukraine

On 21 March 2014, the OSCE deployed its Special Monitoring Mission to Ukraine at the request of Ukraine's government. The mission has received mixed reviews. While some observers have applauded its function as the "eyes and ears of the international community," others have accused the mission of bias towards either Russia or Ukraine.

On 27 April 2014, the Girkin group that had taken control in the city of Sloviansk took eight members of the OSCE Special Monitoring Mission (OSCE SMM) as hostages. The group appointed Vyacheslav Ponomarev as mayor of the city.

During the war in Donbas, an OSCE observer allowed Russian separatists to travel in a vehicle with the organization's markings; this prompted allegations that the OSCE was biased in the war and not interested in carrying out its duties of mediating a ceasefire. The organization issued a statement regretting the incident.

Moreover, the OSCE Observer Mission at Russian Checkpoints Gukovo and Donetsk (which is organizationally separate from the Special Monitoring Mission) also received criticism alleging that only two checkpoints on the Russian–Ukrainian border are currently being monitored, which Daniel Baer, the US ambassador to the OSCE at the time, described as "seriously inadequate."

The mission has been criticized for taking months to deploy drones to help monitor borders as well as withdrawing them after only several weeks of use due to Russian electronic attacks. Drones have been reintroduced to observe the conflict in 2018.

In 2014, an advisor to the Ukrainian Ministry of Defence wrongly claimed that approximately 80% of the OSCE observers located near Mariupol were Russian citizens and that many had ties to Russian security agencies such as the FSB and the GRU. In reality, one observer out of 17 in Mariupol was a Russian citizen. In total, the mission reports the number of Russian citizens in its ranks as 39 out of 720, or 5.4%. The organization has also been accused of allegedly revealing the locations of Ukrainian troops to Russian forces during the conflict.

On 1 December 2014, the mission was in the area to "facilitate a local ceasefire and monitor the repair works on a power station", that it "heard an exchange of artillery fire between unspecified parties", and that "artillery rounds were impacting at approximately 1km to the east of the SMM's position; therefore the SMM left due to security concerns". Furthermore, the report states that the "SMM team in the JCCC was in constant contact with the SMM team in Staromikhailivka". No mention of a wounded observer is made.

On 27 October 2015, a suspended OSCE monitor confirmed he had been a former employee of Russia's Main Intelligence Directorate. The suspended SMM stated that he had no trouble receiving the position and neither the OSCE nor Ukraine's Security Service thoroughly checked his background. Following the report the OSCE issued a comment stating the monitor had been fired due to violations of the organization's code of conduct.

On 6 April 2016, photos of OSCE monitors attending the wedding of a Russian separatist emerged. The wedding had taken place in June 2015. The OSCE expressed regret over the incident, issuing a statement saying "The unprofessional behaviour displayed by the monitors in the picture is an individual incident that should not be abused to cast a shadow on the reputation of other mission members." The OSCE reported that the monitors were no longer with the OSCE special monitoring mission.

In April 2017, an OSCE vehicle struck a mine, which killed one SMM member and injured two. Two armoured vehicles were on patrol near Luhansk when one struck the mine. The dead man was an American paramedic, while the injured included a woman from Germany and a man from the Czech Republic.

On 18 July 2018, the German broadcaster ARD reported that Russian intelligence services had received inside information about the activities of the OSCE Special Monitoring Mission to Ukraine from a staff member of the OSCE. The insider information consisted of observers' preferences in alcohol and women, their financial situation, and their contacts in Ukraine. The OSCE issued a statement expressing concern over the alleged security breach.

Russia has accused members of the Mission of working for the Ukrainian SBU and of spying on the pro-Russian separatists. Furthermore, Russia has accused the mission of bias after it reported troop movements from separatist forces, accusing the mission of ignoring similar moves from Ukraine. Russia's foreign minister also has claimed that the mission failed to pay sufficient attention to human and minority rights within the Government-controlled areas of Ukraine. Furthermore, he criticized that the mission did not clearly attribute ceasefire violations to either side.

==== 2022 Mission to Armenia ====
An OSCE Needs Assessment Team was sent to Armenia between 21 and 27 October 2022 following the Armenia–Azerbaijan border crisis. The request was made by the government of Armenia. The OSCE sent international experts to monitor the Armenia–Azerbaijan border.

==== OSCE involvement in Ukraine (2022–present) ====
The 2022 Russian invasion of Ukraine began on 24 February. The OSCE mandate in Ukraine expired on 31 March 2022, due to objections by Russia. On 24 April 2022, the OSCE protested the detention of four staff members in Donetsk and Luhansk, without specifying who had detained them. On 20 September, two Ukrainian OSCE staffers were sentenced to 13 years of prison by a court in the Luhansk People's Republic for "alleged high treason and espionage for the United States."

In March 2022, 45 participating States promoted, with the support of Ukraine, the activation of the Moscow Mechanism for the establishment of an independent expert mission on violations and abuses committed in the war of the Russian Federation, supported by Belarus, against Ukraine. The report of the Mission of Experts was presented to the OSCE Permanent Council on 13 April 2022 and documented clear patterns of violations of international humanitarian law by the Russian Armed Forces in Ukraine. OSCE/ODIHR continues to monitor the violations of international humanitarian law and international human rights law in Ukraine.

On 2 June 2022, the same 45 participating States invoked again the Moscow Mechanism to establish a new mission of experts to consider, follow up and build upon the findings of the Moscow Mechanism report published in April 2022. The subsequent report, presented on 14 July 2022 to the OSCE Permanent Council, confirmed the outcomes of the previous mission and identified blatant violations of international humanitarian law, mainly attributable to the Russian armed forces, as well as widespread violations of human rights, especially in the territories under effective control of the Russian Federation.

The Russian delegation was not invited to the 29th OSCE Ministerial Council in December 2022 where the delegates considered the ramifications and regional security challenges created by Russia's continued war against Ukraine. There were calls to assess the reparations that Russia should be accountable for.

Since the start of its invasion of Ukraine, Russia has seized €2.7 million worth of armored vehicles that were previously part of the OSCE Special Monitoring Mission to Ukraine. According to a letter that was sent by Russian OSCE representatives to OSCE Secretary General Helga Schmid in January 2023, 71 trucks and cars were brought to the Luhansk People's Republic and the Donetsk People's Republic as "evidence" and criminal proceedings were initiated against former OSCE personnel for espionage.

On 6 February 2026, Swiss Federal Councillor and OSCE President Ignazio Cassis and Secretary General Feridun Sinirlioglu visited Moscow where they held talks with Russian Foreign Minister Sergey Lavrov on the future of the OSCE in the region. On his first visit since the invasion of Ukraine in February 2022, Cassis offered a mediating role in the conflict. He called for diplomatic efforts to alleviate the suffering of the population. The OSCE supports a negotiated peace. Secretary General Feridun Sinirlioglu demanded the release of imprisoned OSCE employees and explained the organization's central role to rebuild European security. Lavrov described the status of the organization in "deep crisis" and under the destructive influence from Western countries. Despite criticism, Russia's foreign ministry expressed interest to continue attendance, such as the OSCE Ministerial Council meeting in Lugano on December 3−4, 2026.

== OSCE Parliamentary Assembly ==
In 2004, the OSCE Parliamentary Assembly sent election observers to the U.S. presidential elections. The OSCE Parliamentary Assembly's president at the time was Democratic Congressman Alcee Hastings. Hastings had previously been impeached for corruption by the U.S. Congress. The OSCE faced criticism of partisanship and double standards due to Hastings's past and the fact that the OSCE's mandate was to promote democracy and the values of civil society.

In 2010, the Parliamentary Assembly of the Organization for Security and Co-operation in Europe was criticized from within by the Latvian delegation for lacking transparency and democracy. Spencer Oliver (b. 1938) secretary general of the OSCE Parliamentary Assembly, who held the post from the organization's inception in 1992 until 2015, faced a challenge from the Latvian Artis Pabriks. According to the rules of the OSCE Parliamentary Assembly, the incumbent general secretary can only be replaced with a full consensus minus one. Pabriks called the rules "quite shocking from the perspective of an organization that's monitoring elections."

== Synopsis and list of members ==
=== Languages ===
The six official languages of the OSCE are English, French, German, Italian, Spanish and Russian.

=== Participating states ===
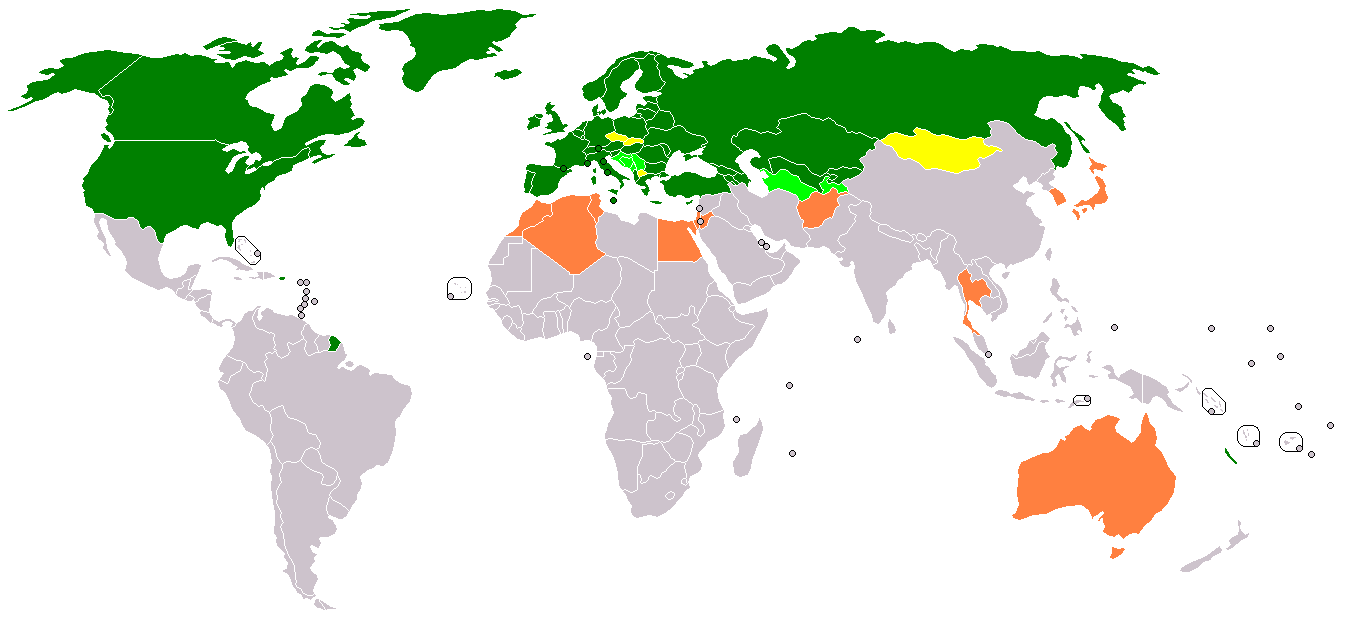
OSCE signatories as of 2012 signed Helsinki Final Act and Paris Charter signed Helsinki Final Act only non-signatory participant partner for cooperation

| State | Admission | Signed the | |
| State | Admission | Helsinki Final Act | Charter of Paris |
|---|---|---|---|
| Albania | 19 June 1991 | 16 September 1991 | 17 September 1991 |
| Andorra | 25 April 1996 | 10 November 1999 | 17 February 1998 |
| Armenia | 30 January 1992 | 8 July 1992 | 17 April 1992 |
| Austria | 25 June 1973 | 1 August 1975 | 21 November 1990 |
| Azerbaijan | 30 January 1992 | 8 July 1992 | 20 December 1993 |
| Belarus | 30 January 1992 | 26 February 1992 | 8 April 1993 |
| Belgium | 25 June 1973 | 1 August 1975 | 21 November 1990 |
| Bosnia and Herzegovina | 30 April 1992 | 8 July 1992 | (Note: Yugoslavia was an original signatory.) |
| Bulgaria | 25 June 1973 | 1 August 1975 | 21 November 1990 |
| Canada | 25 June 1973 | 1 August 1975 | 21 November 1990 |
| Croatia | 24 March 1992 | 8 July 1992 | |
| Cyprus | 25 June 1973 | 1 August 1975 | 21 November 1990 |
| Czech Republic | 1 January 1993 | (Note: Czechoslovakia was an original signatory) | |
| Denmark | 25 June 1973 | 1 August 1975 | 21 November 1990 |
| Estonia | 10 September 1991 | 14 October 1991 | 6 December 1991 |
| Finland | 25 June 1973 | 1 August 1975 | 21 November 1990 |
| France | 25 June 1973 | 1 August 1975 | 21 November 1990 |
| Georgia | 24 March 1992 | 8 July 1992 | 21 January 1994 |
| Germany → as West Germany → as East Germany | 25 June 1973 | 1 August 1975 | 21 November 1990 |
| Greece | 25 June 1973 | 1 August 1975 | 21 November 1990 |
| Holy See | 25 June 1973 | 1 August 1975 | 21 November 1990 |
| Hungary | 25 June 1973 | 1 August 1975 | 21 November 1990 |
| Iceland | 25 June 1973 | 1 August 1975 | 21 November 1990 |
| Ireland | 25 June 1973 | 1 August 1975 | 21 November 1990 |
| Italy | 25 June 1973 | 1 August 1975 | 21 November 1990 |
| Kazakhstan | 30 January 1992 | 8 July 1992 | 23 September 1992 |
| Kyrgyzstan | 30 January 1992 | 8 July 1992 | 3 June 1994 |
| Latvia | 10 September 1991 | 14 October 1991 | 6 December 1991 |
| Liechtenstein | 25 June 1973 | 1 August 1975 | 21 November 1990 |
| Lithuania | 10 September 1991 | 14 October 1991 | 6 December 1991 |
| Luxembourg | 25 June 1973 | 1 August 1975 | 21 November 1990 |
| Malta | 25 June 1973 | 1 August 1975 | 21 November 1990 |
| Moldova | 30 January 1992 | 26 February 1992 | 29 January 1993 |
| Monaco | 25 June 1973 | 1 August 1975 | 21 November 1990 |
| Mongolia | 21 November 2012 (Note: Asia partner for co-operation 2004–2012) | | |
| Montenegro | 22 June 2006 | 1 September 2006 | |
| Netherlands | 25 June 1973 | 1 August 1975 | 21 November 1990 |
| North Macedonia (Note: Previously referred to by the OSCE as the "Former Yugoslav Republic of Macedonia") | 12 October 1995 | 8 July 1992 | |
| Norway | 25 June 1973 | 1 August 1975 | 21 November 1990 |
| Poland | 25 June 1973 | 1 August 1975 | 21 November 1990 |
| Portugal | 25 June 1973 | 1 August 1975 | 21 November 1990 |
| Romania | 25 June 1973 | 1 August 1975 | 21 November 1990 |
| Russia (as USSR) | 25 June 1973 | 1 August 1975 | 21 November 1990 |
| San Marino | 25 June 1973 | 1 August 1975 | 21 November 1990 |
| Serbia (as FR Yugoslavia) | 10 November 2000 | 27 November 2000 | 27 November 2000 |
| Slovakia | 1 January 1993 | | |
| Slovenia | 24 March 1992 | 8 July 1992 | 8 March 1993 |
| Spain | 25 June 1973 | 1 August 1975 | 21 November 1990 |
| Sweden | 25 June 1973 | 1 August 1975 | 21 November 1990 |
| Switzerland | 25 June 1973 | 1 August 1975 | 21 November 1990 |
| Tajikistan | 30 January 1992 | 26 February 1992 | |
| Turkey | 25 June 1973 | 1 August 1975 | 21 November 1990 |
| Turkmenistan | 30 January 1992 | 8 July 1992 | |
| Ukraine | 30 January 1992 | 26 February 1992 | 16 June 1992 |
| United Kingdom | 25 June 1973 | 1 August 1975 | 21 November 1990 |
| United States | 25 June 1973 | 1 August 1975 | 21 November 1990 |
| Uzbekistan | 30 January 1992 | 26 February 1992 | 27 October 1993 |

==== Partners for co-operation ====
Middle East and North Africa States

- Algeria
- Egypt
- Israel
- Jordan
- Morocco
- Tunisia

Asia

- Japan (1992–present)
- South Korea (1994–present)
- Thailand (2000–present)
- Afghanistan (2003–2021) (Note: Despite the Taliban's return to power in 2021, there is no current evidence that the OSCE has removed the country from its list of partners in cooperation.)

Oceania

- Australia (2009–present)

== Legal status ==
A unique aspect of the OSCE is the non-binding status of its constitutive charter. Rather than being a formal treaty ratified by national legislatures, the Helsinki Final Act represents a political commitment by the heads of government of all signatories to build security and cooperation in Europe on the basis of its provisions. This allows the OSCE to remain a flexible process for the evolution of improved cooperation, which avoids disputes and/or sanctions over implementation.

By agreeing to these commitments, signatories for the first time accepted that the treatment of citizens within their borders was also a matter of legitimate international concern. This open process of the OSCE is often given credit for helping build democracy in the Soviet Union and Eastern Europe, thus leading to the end of the Cold War. Unlike most international intergovernmental organizations, however, the OSCE does not have international legal personality on account of the lack of legal effect of its charter. As a result, its headquarters' host, Austria, had to confer legal personality on the organization in order to be able to sign a legal agreement regarding its presence in Vienna.

== Structure and institutions ==
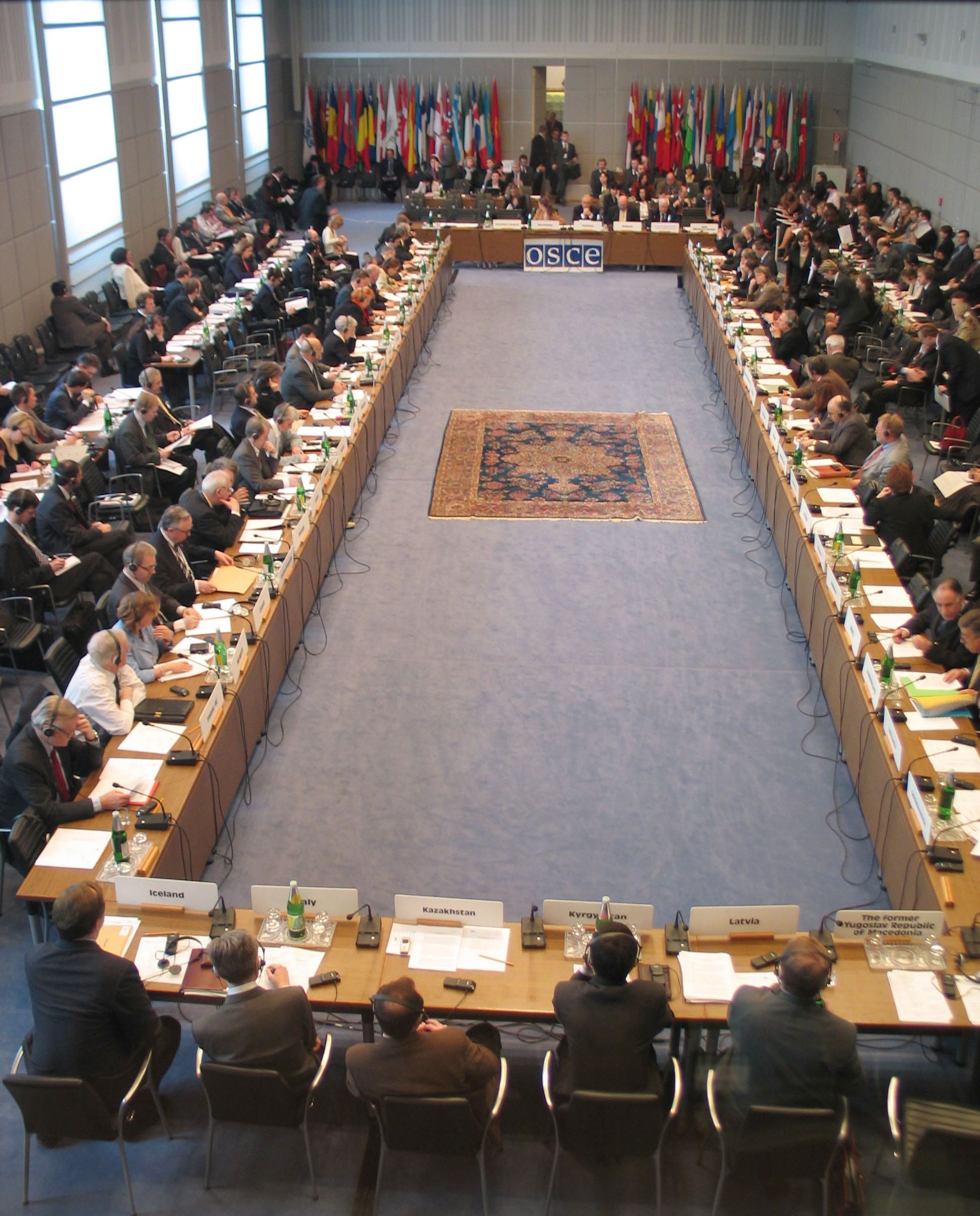
A meeting of the OSCE Permanent Council at the Hofburg in Vienna, Austria

Political direction to the organization is given by heads of state or government during summits. Summits are not regular or scheduled but held as needed. The last summit took place in Astana (Kazakhstan), on 1 and 2 December 2010. The high-level decision-making body of the organization is the OSCE Ministerial Council, which meets at the end of every year. At the ambassadorial level, the OSCE Permanent Council convenes weekly in Vienna and serves as the regular negotiating and decision-making body. The chairman of the Permanent Council is the ambassador to the Organization of the participating State which holds the chairmanship.

In addition to the Ministerial Council and Permanent Council, the Forum for Security Co-operation is also an OSCE decision-making body. It deals predominantly with matters of military co-operation, such as modalities for inspections according to the Vienna Document of 1999.

The OSCE's Secretariat is located in Vienna, Austria. The organization also has offices in Copenhagen, Geneva, The Hague, Prague and Warsaw.

As of October 2021, the OSCE employed 3,568 staff, including 609 in its secretariat and institutions and 2,959 in its 17 field operations.

The Parliamentary Assembly of the Organization for Security and Co-operation in Europe is made up of 323 parliamentarians from 57 member states. The Parliamentary Assembly performs its functions mainly via the Standing Committee, the Bureau, and 3 General Committees (Committee on Political Affairs and Security, Committee on Economic Affairs, Science, Technology and Environment, and Committee on Democracy, Human Rights and Humanitarian Questions).

The Parliamentary Assembly passes resolutions on matters such as political and security affairs, economic and environmental issues, and democracy and human rights. Representing the collective voice of OSCE parliamentarians, these resolutions and recommendations are meant to ensure that all participating states live up to their OSCE commitments. The Parliamentary Assembly also engages in parliamentary diplomacy, and has an extensive election observation program.

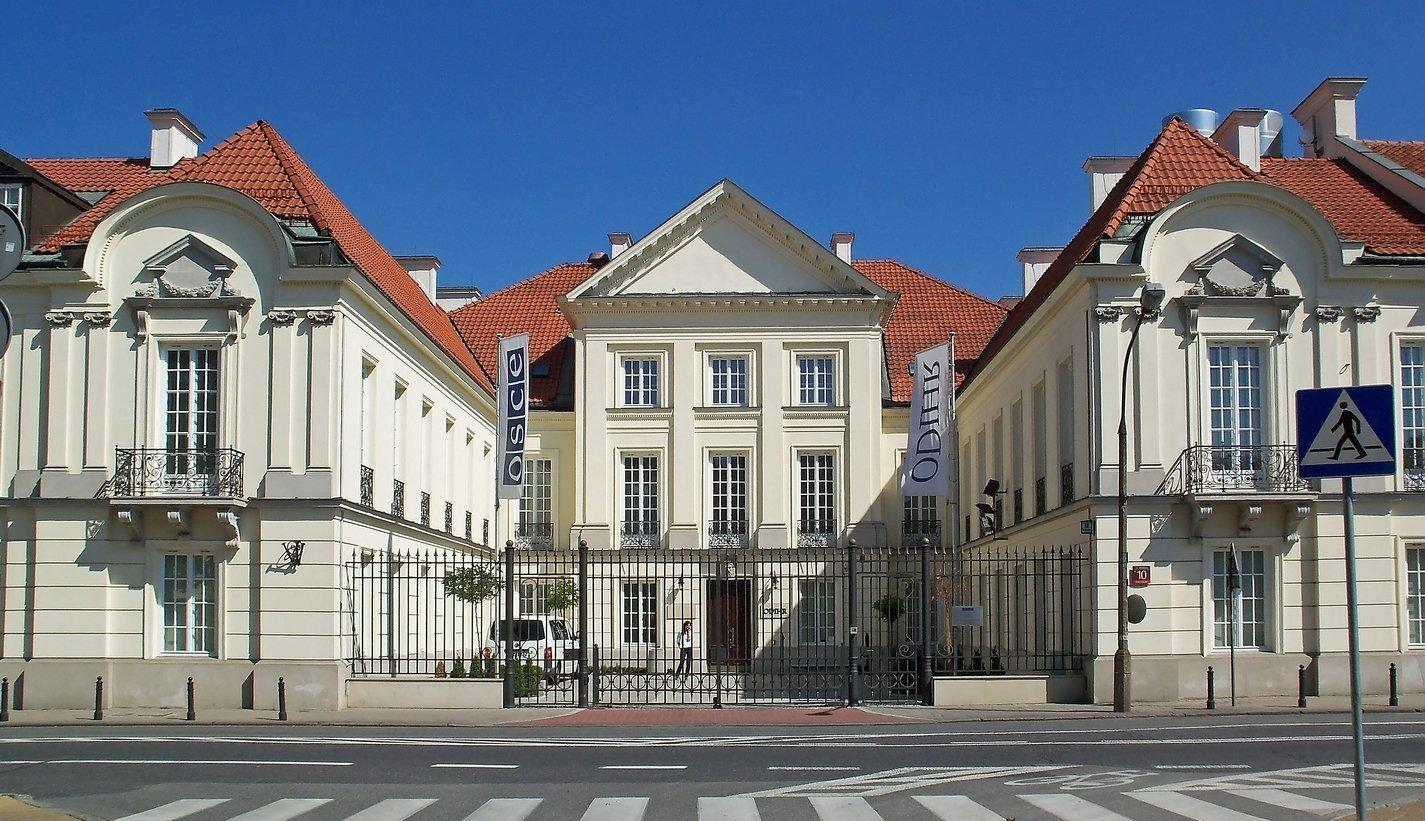
The Młodziejowski Palace in Warsaw, the seat of the ODIHR

The oldest OSCE institution is the Office for Democratic Institutions and Human Rights (ODIHR), established in 1991 following a decision made at the 1990 Summit of Paris. It is based in Warsaw, Poland, and is active throughout the OSCE area in the fields of election observation, democratic development, human rights, tolerance and non-discrimination, rule of law, and Roma and Sinti issues. The ODIHR has observed over 300 elections and referendums since 1995, sending more than 50,000 observers. It has operated outside its own area twice, sending a team that offered technical support to the 9 October 2004 presidential elections in Afghanistan, an OSCE Partner for Co-operation, and an election support team to assist with parliamentary and provincial council elections on 18 September 2005. ODIHR is headed by Matteo Mecacci, Italy.

The Office of the OSCE Representative on Freedom of the Media, established in December 1997, acts as a watchdog to provide early warning on violations of freedom of expression in OSCE participating States. The representative also assists participating States by advocating and promoting full compliance with OSCE norms, principles and commitments regarding freedom of expression and free media. As of 2020, the current representative is Teresa Ribeiro, Portugal.

The High Commissioner on National Minorities was created on 8 July 1992 by the Helsinki Summit Meeting of the Conference on Security and Cooperation in Europe. It is charged with identifying and seeking early resolution of ethnic tension that might endanger peace, stability or friendly relations between participating states. As of 2020, the current representative is Kairat Abdrakhmanov (Kazakhstan).

Each year the OSCE holds an OSCE Asian Conference with partner nations (currently Australia, Thailand, South Korea, Japan and Afghanistan).

The OSCE and the Government of the Kyrgyz Republic established the OSCE Academy in 2002. The aim of the OSCE Academy is "to promote regional cooperation, conflict prevention and good governance in Central Asia through offering post-graduate education, professional training and intellectual exchange."

=== List ===
- Court of Conciliation and Arbitration
- High Commissioner on National Minorities
- Minsk Group
- Office for Democratic Institutions and Human Rights
- Parliamentary Assembly
- Representative on Freedom of the Media
- Secretariat

== Field operations ==
Almost all field operations of OSCE have been conducted in countries of former Yugoslavia and the former Soviet Union.

=== Active ===
The following field missions are currently active:

| Mission | Region | Deployed | Notes |
|---|---|---|---|
| Presence in Albania | Albania | 1999 | |
| Mission to Bosnia and Herzegovina | Bosnia and Herzegovina | 1995 | Dayton Agreement |
| Mission in Kosovo | Kosovo | 1999 | Kosovo War |
| Mission to Montenegro | Montenegro | 2006 | |
| Mission to Serbia | Serbia | 2001 | |
| Mission to Skopje | North Macedonia | 2001 | Ohrid Agreement (2001) |
| Mission to Moldova | Moldova | 1992 | Transnistria conflict |
| Centre in Ashgabat | Turkmenistan | 1999 | |
| Programme Office in Astana | Kazakhstan | 1998 | |
| Programme Office in Bishkek | Kyrgyzstan | 1998 | |
| Programme Office in Dushanbe | Tajikistan | 1994 | |
| Project Co-ordinator in Uzbekistan | Uzbekistan | 1995 | |

=== Discontinued ===
The following field missions have been completed, closed or discontinued:

| Mission | Region | Start | End | Notes |
|---|---|---|---|---|
| Missions of Long Duration in Kosovo, Sandjak and Vojvodina | Federal Republic of Yugoslavia ∟ Kosovo ∟ Sandjak ∟ Vojvodina | 8 September 1992 | July 1993 | Yugoslav Wars |
| Mission to Georgia | Georgia | November 1992 | 31 December 2008 | |
| Mission to Estonia | Estonia | 15 February 1993 | 31 December 2001 | |
| Mission to Latvia | Latvia | 19 November 1993 | 31 December 2001 | |
| Mission to Ukraine | Ukraine | 24 November 1994 | 30 April 1999 | |
| Representative to the Estonian Expert Commission on Military Pensioners | Estonia | 1994 | 1996 | |
| OSCE Minsk Group / Personal Representative of the Chairman-in-Office on the Conflict Dealt with by the OSCE Minsk Conference | Armenia; Azerbaijan | 1995 | 2025 | Nagorno-Karabakh conflict |
| Liaison Office in Central Asia | Uzbekistan | 16 March 1995 | December 2000 | |
| Representative to the Joint Committee on the Skrunda Radar Station | Latvia | 6 April 1995 | 31 October 1999 | |
| Assistance Group to Chechnya | Russia ∟ Chechnya | 26 April 1995 | 16 December 1998 | First Chechen War |
| Personal Representative of the OSCE Chairman-in-Office for Article IV, Annex 1-B of the General Framework Agreement for Peace in Bosnia and Herzegovina | Bosnia and Herzegovina | 1995 | 2015 | Dayton Agreement |
| Mission to Croatia / Office in Zagreb | Croatia | July 1996 | 17 January 2012 | Croatian War of Independence |
| Advisory and Monitoring Group in Belarus | Belarus | January 1998 | 31 December 2002 | |
| Kosovo Verification Mission / Transitional Task Force for Kosovo | Federal Republic of Yugoslavia ∟ Kosovo | October 1998 | June 1999 | Kosovo conflict |
| Office in Yerevan | Armenia | 16 February 2000 | 31 August 2017 | |
| Office in Baku / Project Co-ordinator in Baku | Azerbaijan | July 2000 | 31 December 2015 | |
| Office in Minsk | Belarus | 1 January 2003 | 31 March 2011 | |
| Observer Mission at the Russian Checkpoints Gukovo and Donetsk | Russia | 24 July 2014 | 30 September 2021 | |
| Special Monitoring Mission to Ukraine | Ukraine | March 2014 | March 2022 | Russo-Ukrainian war |
| Project Co-ordinator in Ukraine | Ukraine | June 1999 | March 2022 | |
| Needs Assessment Team in Armenia | Armenia | 21 October 2022 | 27 October 2022 | Nagorno-Karabakh conflict |

== Chairmanship ==
OSCE Permanent Council venue at the Hofburg, Vienna

The OSCE chairmanship is assumed at yearly intervals by one participating state, which then plays the central role in managing the organization's work and in its external representation. The foreign minister of the country possessing the chair holds the OSCE's most senior position as chairman-in-office (CiO).

The responsibilities of the chairman-in-office include:

- co-ordination of the work of OSCE institutions;
- representing the OSCE;
- supervising activities related to conflict prevention, crisis management, and post-conflict rehabilitation.

The CiO is assisted by the previous and incoming chairmen-in-office; the three of them together constitute the OSCE Troika. The CiO nominates personal representatives – experts in fields of priority for the CiO. The origin of the institution lies with the Charter of Paris for a New Europe (1990), and the Helsinki Document (1992) formally institutionalized this function.

The OSCE chair for 2022 was Poland, with Zbigniew Rau serving as chairman-in-office. The chair for 2023 was North Macedonia, represented by Bujar Osmani as chairman-in-office.

=== Chairmanship history ===
Chairmanship of the OSCE is held by a member state on a calendar-year basis, with the minister for foreign affairs of that state performing the function of chairman-in-office. The table below shows the holders since 1991. Estonia was due to hold the chairmanship in 2024, however this was not approved following objections from Russia and Belarus.

| Year | Country | Chairman-in-Office |
|---|---|---|
| 1991 | Germany | Hans-Dietrich Genscher (from June) |
| 1992 | Czechoslovakia | Jiří Dienstbier (until 2 July); Jozef Moravčík (from 3 July) |
| 1993 | Sweden | Margaretha af Ugglas |
| 1994 | Italy | Beniamino Andreatta (until 11 May); Antonio Martino (from 12 May) |
| 1995 | Hungary | László Kovács |
| 1996 | Switzerland | Flavio Cotti |
| 1997 | Denmark | Niels Helveg Petersen |
| 1998 | Poland | Bronisław Geremek |
| 1999 | Norway | Knut Vollebæk |
| 2000 | Austria | Wolfgang Schüssel (until 4 February); Benita Ferrero-Waldner (from 5 February) |
| 2001 | Romania | Mircea Geoană |
| 2002 | Portugal | Jaime Gama (until 6 April); António Martins da Cruz (from 7 April) |
| 2003 | Netherlands | Jaap de Hoop Scheffer (until 3 December); Bernard Bot (from 4 December) |
| 2004 | Bulgaria | Solomon Passy |
| 2005 | Slovenia | Dimitrij Rupel |
| 2006 | Belgium | Karel De Gucht |
| 2007 | Spain | Miguel Ángel Moratinos |
| 2008 | Finland | Ilkka Kanerva (until 4 April); Alexander Stubb (from 5 April) |
| 2009 | Greece | Dora Bakoyannis (until 5 October); George Papandreou (from 6 October) |
| 2010 | Kazakhstan | Kanat Saudabayev |
| 2011 | Lithuania | Audronius Ažubalis |
| 2012 | Ireland | Eamon Gilmore |
| 2013 | Ukraine | Leonid Kozhara |
| 2014 | Switzerland | Didier Burkhalter |
| 2015 | Serbia | Ivica Dačić |
| 2016 | Germany | Frank-Walter Steinmeier |
| 2017 | Austria | Sebastian Kurz (until 18 December); Karin Kneissl (from 18 December) |
| 2018 | Italy | Angelino Alfano (until 1 June); Enzo Moavero Milanesi (from 1 June) |
| 2019 | Slovakia | Miroslav Lajčák |
| 2020 | Albania | Edi Rama |
| 2021 | Sweden | Ann Linde |
| 2022 | Poland | Zbigniew Rau |
| 2023 | North Macedonia | Bujar Osmani |
| 2024 | Malta | Ian Borg |
| 2025 | Finland | Elina Valtonen |
| 2026 | Switzerland | Ignazio Cassis |

== Secretary General ==
While the chairman-in-office is the OSCE's most senior official, on a day-to-day basis the Secretary General is the OSCE's chief administrative officer and can, when requested by the chairmanship, serve as a representative of the chairman-in-office. Since the establishment of the office in 1992, the secretaries general have been:

| Secretary General | Country | Term of office |
|---|---|---|
| Wilhelm Höynck | Germany | 1993–1996 |
| Giancarlo Aragona | Italy | 1996–1999 |
| Ján Kubiš | Slovakia | 1999–2005 |
| Marc Perrin de Brichambaut | France | 2005–2011 |
| Lamberto Zannier | Italy | 2011–2017 |
| Thomas Greminger | Switzerland | 2017–2020 |
| Helga Schmid | Germany | 2020–2024 |
| Feridun Sinirlioğlu | Turkey | 2024– |

== Summits of heads of state and government ==
| Summit | Date | Location | Country | Decisions |
|---|---|---|---|---|
| I | 30 July – 1 August 1975 | Helsinki | Finland | Closing of the Conference on Security and Cooperation in Europe (CSCE). Signing of the Final Act (Helsinki Act). |
| II | 19–21 November 1990 | Paris | France | (Second CSCE Summit). Signing of the Charter of Paris for a New Europe (Paris Charter), the Vienna Confidence and Security Building Measures (CSBM) Document and the CFE Treaty. |
| III | 9–10 July 1992 | Helsinki | Finland | Final Document: The Challenges of Change. Creation of the High Commissioner on National Minorities, the Forum for Security Co-operation and the Economic Forum. Suspension of FR Yugoslavia from membership. |
| IV | 5–6 December 1994 | Budapest | Hungary | Final Document: Towards a Genuine Partnership in a New Era. Approval of a multi-national peace-keeping force to Nagorno-Karabakh. Endorsement of the Code of Conduct on politico-military aspects of security. |
| V | 2–3 December 1996 | Lisbon | Portugal | (First OSCE Summit). Lisbon Declaration on a Common and Comprehensive Security Model for Europe for the Twenty-First Century. Adoption of a Framework for Arms Control. |
| VI | 18–19 November 1999 | Istanbul | Turkey | Signing of the Istanbul Document and the Charter for European Security. |
| VII | 1–2 December 2010 | Astana | Kazakhstan | Adoption of the Astana Commemorative Declaration, which reconfirms the Organization's comprehensive approach to security based on trust and transparency. |

=== Ministerial Council Meetings (ordinary) ===
| Council | Date | Location | Country | Decisions | Doc |
|---|---|---|---|---|---|
| 1st | 19–20 June 1991 | Berlin | Germany | Admission of Albania. | |
| | 10 September 1991 | Moscow | Russia | Question of the admission of the Republics of Estonia, Latvia and Lithuania. | |
| 2nd | 30–31 January 1992 | Prague | Czechoslovakia | Admission of ten former Soviet republics. | |
| 3rd | 14–15 December 1992 | Stockholm | Sweden | Creation of the post of Secretary General and appointment of Max van der Stoel as first High Commissioner on National Minorities. | |
| 4th | 30 November – 1 December 1993 | Rome | Italy | Establishment of the Mission to Tajikistan. | |
| 5th | 7–8 December 1995 | Budapest | Hungary | Establishment of the Mission in Bosnia and Herzegovina to carry out the tasks assigned to the OSCE in the Dayton Peace Agreements. | |
| 6th | 18–19 December 1997 | Copenhagen | Denmark | Creation of the Co-ordinator of OSCE Economic and Environmental Activities and the Representative on Freedom of the Media. | |
| 7th | 2–3 December 1998 | Oslo | Norway | | |
| 8th | 27–28 November 2000 | Vienna | Austria | Vienna Declaration on the OSCE's activities in South-Eastern Europe. Re-admission of FR Yugoslavia. | |
| 9th | 3–4 December 2001 | Bucharest | Romania | Bucharest Declaration. Bucharest Plan of Action for Combating Terrorism. Creation of the Strategic Police Matters Unit and a Senior Police Adviser in the OSCE Secretariat. | |
| 10th | 6– 7 December 2002 | Porto | Portugal | Porto Declaration: Responding to Change. OSCE Charter on Preventing and Combating Terrorism. | |
| 11th | 1–2 December 2003 | Maastricht | Netherlands | Strategy to Address Threats to Security and Stability in the Twenty-First Century. Strategy Document for the Economic and Environmental Dimension. | |
| 12th | 6–7 December 2004 | Sofia | Bulgaria | | |
| 13th | 5–6 December 2005 | Ljubljana | Slovenia | Statement on the International Convention for the Suppression of Acts of Nuclear Terrorism. Approval of the Border Security and Management Concept. | |
| 14th | 4–5 December 2006 | Brussels | Belgium | Brussels Declaration on Criminal Justice Systems. Ministerial Statement on Supporting and Promoting the International Legal Framework against Terrorism. | |
| 15th | 29–30 November 2007 | Madrid | Spain | Madrid Declaration on Environment and Security. Ministerial Statement on Supporting the United Nations Global Counter-Terrorism Strategy. | |
| 16th | 4–5 December 2008 | Helsinki | Finland | | |
| 17th | 1–2 December 2009 | Athens | Greece | Ministerial Declarations on Non-Proliferation and on the OSCE Corfu Process. | |
| | 16–17 July 2010 | Almaty | Kazakhstan | Informal discussions on Corfu Process progress, the situation in Kyrgyzstan and the forthcoming OSCE summit. | |
| 18th | 6–7 December 2011 | Vilnius | Lithuania | Decisions on responses to conflicts and transnational threats; to enhance capabilities in early warning; early action; dialogue facilitation and mediation support; and post-conflict rehabilitation. Decisions to enhance engagement with OSCE Partners for Co-operation, Afghanistan in particular. | |
| 19th | 6–7 December 2012 | Dublin | Ireland | Helsinki+40 Process: clear path to the 2015 40th anniversary of the Helsinki Final Act, intent to reinforce and revitalize the OSCE; unanimous support for Transnistrian settlement process: negotiated, comprehensive, just and viable solution to the conflict; strengthening good governance: deepening engagement in preventing and countering corruption, addressing transnational threats, and adding an anti-terrorism framework to earlier decisions on threats from information and communication technologies, drugs and chemical precursors and strategic policing; despite Ireland's hopes, a decision on human rights was not reached: greater, still, was concern for the council's trend of human rights decision-failures. | |
| 20th | 5–6 December 2013 | Kyiv | Ukraine | Decision on combating trafficking in human beings. Decision on the freedom of thought, conscience, religion or belief. Ministerial Declaration on Strengthening the OSCE's Efforts to Address Transnational Threats. Decision on improving the environmental footprint of energy-related activities in the OSCE region. Ministerial Declaration on the Update of the OSCE Principles Governing Non-Proliferation. Decision on enhancing OSCE efforts to implement the Action Plan on Improving the Situation of Roma and Sinti Within the OSCE Area, With a Particular Focus on Roma and Sinti Women, Youth and Children. Ministerial Statement on the Work of the Permanent Conference on Political Issues in the Framework of the Negotiation Process for the Transnistrian Settlement in the 5+2 format. Declaration on Furthering the Helsinki+40 Process. Decision on the small arms and light weapons and stockpiles of conventional ammunition. Decision on the protection of energy networks from natural and man-made disasters. | |
| 21st | 4–5 December 2014 | Basel | Switzerland | Declaration on further steps in the Helsinki+40 Process. Ministerial statement on the negotiations on the Transnistrian Settlement Process in the 5+2 format. Declaration on youth. Declaration on the Transfer of Ownership to the Parties to the Agreement on Sub-regional Arms Control, Annex 1B, Article IV of the General Framework Agreement for Peace in Bosnia and Herzegovina. Declaration on the OSCE role in countering the phenomenon of foreign terrorist fighters in the context of the implementation of UN Security Council resolutions 2170 and 2178. Declaration on the OSCE role in countering kidnapping and hostage-taking committed by terrorist groups in the context of the implementation of the UN Security Council resolution 2133. Decision on the prevention of corruption. Decision on enhancing disaster risk reduction. Decision on preventing and combating violence against women. Decision on an addendum to the 2004 OSCE Action Plan for the Promotion of Gender Equality. Ministerial commemorative declaration on the seventieth anniversary of the end of the Second World War. Declaration on enhancing efforts to combat anti-Semitism. Declaration on co-operation with the Mediterranean Partners. Ministerial declaration on co-operation with the Asian Partners. Decision on small arms and light weapons and stockpiles of conventional ammunition. Commemorative Declaration on the Occasion of the Twentieth Anniversary of the OSCE Code of Conduct on Politico-Military Aspects of Security. | |
| 22nd | 3–4 December 2015 | Belgrade | Serbia | Ministerial Declaration on Preventing and Countering Violent Extremism and Radicalization that lead to Terrorism. Declaration on the OSCE Activities in Support of Global Efforts in Tackling the World Drug Problem. Ministerial Declaration on Reinforcing OSCE Efforts to Counter Terrorism in the Wake of Recent Terrorist Attacks. Declaration on Youth and Security. Ministerial Statement on the Negotiations on the Transnistrian Settlement Process in the 5+2 format. | |
| 23rd | 8–9 December 2016 | Hamburg | Germany | Decision on the OSCE's role in the governance of large movements of migrants and refugees. Decision on strengthening good governance and promoting connectivity. Decision on OSCE efforts related to reducing the risks of conflict stemming from the use of information and communication technologies. Declaration on strengthening OSCE efforts to prevent and counter terrorism. Decision on enhancing the use of Advance Passenger Information. Ministerial statement on the negotiations on the Transnistrian Settlement Process in the 5+2 format. | |
| 24th | 7–8 December 2017 | Vienna | Austria | Decision on enhancing OSCE efforts to reduce the risk of conflict stemming from the use of information and communication technologies. Decision on strengthening efforts to prevent trafficking in human beings. Decision on strengthening efforts to combat all forms of child trafficking, including for sexual exploitation, as well as other forms of sexual exploitation of children. Decision on promoting economic participation in the OSCE area. Decision on small arms and light weapons and stockpiles of conventional ammunition. Ministerial Statement on the negotiations on the Transnistrian settlement process in the 5+2 format. | |
| 25th | 6–7 December 2018 | Milan | Italy | Decision on Safety of Journalists. Decision on Preventing and Combating Violence Against Women. Decision on Human Capital Development in the Digital Era. Ministerial Statement on the Negotiations on the Transnistrian Settlement Process in the 5+2 format. Declaration on the Digital Economy a Driver for Promoting Co-operation, Security and Growth. Declaration on the Role of Youth in Contribution to Peace and Security Efforts. Declaration on Security and Co-operation in the Mediterranean. Declaration on OSCE Efforts in the Field of Norms and Best Practices on Small Arms and Light Weapons and Stockpiles of Conventional Ammunition. | |
| 26th | 5–6 December 2019 | Bratislava | Slovakia | Commemorative Declaration on the Occasion of the 25th Anniversary of the OSCE Code of Conduct on Politico-Military Aspects of Security. Ministerial Statement on the Negotiations on the Transnistrian Settlement Process in the "5+2" Format. Document No. 2, Commemorative. Declaration on the Occasion of the Twenty-Fifth Anniversary of the OSCE Principles Governing Non-Proliferation and Fifteenth Anniversary of United Nations Security Council Resolution 1540. | |
| 27th | 3–4 December 2020 | Tirana | Albania | Decision on Preventing and Combating Corruption through Digitalization and Increased Transparency. Decision on Prevention and Eradication of Torture and Other Cruel, Inhuman or Degrading Treatment or Punishment. Declaration on Strengthening Co-operation in Countering Transnational Organized Crime. Declaration on Co-operation With the OSCE Asian Partners. Ministerial Statement on the Negotiations on the Transnistrian Settlement Process in the 5+2 format. | |
| 28th | 2–3 December 2021 | Stockholm | Sweden | | |
| 29th | 1–2 December 2022 | Łódź | Poland | For the first time a delegation was not invited, Russia was not permitted to attend because of the ongoing invasion of Ukraine. The President of the OSCE Parliamentary Assembly Margareta Cederfelt said: "This OSCE Ministerial Council should take steps to establish a high-level body to examine the damages inflicted by the Russian Federation on Ukraine, and to assess the reparations that Russia should be accountable for. Russia started this war, and it must pay for it." Most OSCE participating states support an initiative by Ukraine to create a special tribunal to prosecute Russia for the crime of aggression. | |
| 30th | 29 November – 1 December 2023 | Skopje | North Macedonia | | |
| 31st | 5–6 December 2024 | Valletta | Malta | | |
| 32nd | 4–5 December 2025 | Vienna | Austria | | |

=== Fiscal history ===
Since 1993, the OSCE's budget by year (in millions of euro) has been:

- 2024 ... €138.2 million
- 2023 ... €135.5 million
- 2022 ... €139.1 million
- 2021 ... €138.2 million
- 2020 ... €138.2 million
- 2019 ... €138.2 million
- 2018 ... €137.8 million
- 2017 ... €139.0 million
- 2016 ... €141.1 million
- 2015 ... €141.1 million
- 2014 ... €142.3 million
- 2013 ... €144.8 million
- 2012 ... €148.4 million
- 2011 ... €150.0 million
- 2010 ... €150.7 million
- 2009 ... €158.6 million
- 2008 ... €164.1 million
- 2007 ... €186.2 million
- 2006 ... €186.2 million
- 2005 ... €186.6 million
- 2004 ... €180.8 million
- 2003 ... €165.5 million
- 2002 ... €167.5 million
- 2001 ... €194.5 million
- 2000 ... €202.7 million
- 1999 ... €146.1 million
- 1998 ... €118.7 million
- 1997 ... €43.3 million
- 1996 ... €34.9 million
- 1995 ... €18.9 million
- 1994 ... €21 million
- 1993 ... €12 million
View source data.

== Relations with the United Nations ==
The OSCE considers itself a regional organization in the sense of Chapter VIII of the United Nations Charter and is an observer in the United Nations General Assembly. The Chairman-in-Office gives routine briefings to the United Nations Security Council.

== The three dimensions ==
=== Politico-military dimension (first dimension) ===
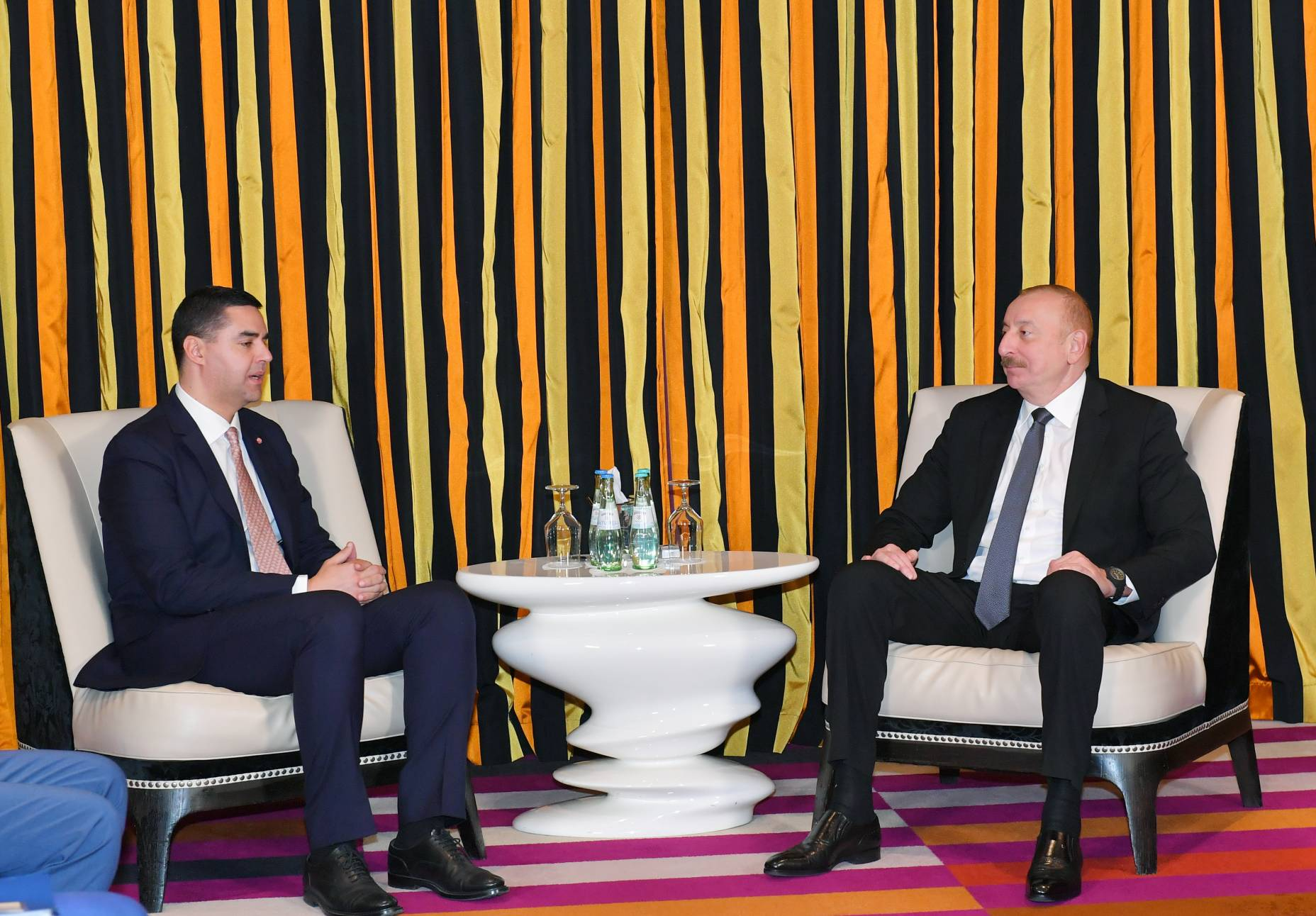
OSCE Chair-in-Office Ian Borg with Azerbaijan's President Ilham Aliyev in February 2024

The OSCE takes a comprehensive approach to the politico-military dimension of security, which includes a number of commitments by participating States and mechanisms for conflict prevention and resolution. The organization also seeks to enhance military security by promoting greater openness, transparency and co-operation.

Arms control

The end of the Cold War resulted in a huge amount of surplus weapons becoming available in what is known as the international grey market for weapons. The OSCE helps to stop the—often illegal—spread of such weapons and offers assistance with their destruction. The OSCE hosts the annual exchange of information under the Conventional Forces in Europe treaty. The OSCE has also implemented two additional exchanges of information, the Vienna Document and the Global Exchange of Military Information. The Open Skies Consultative Commission, the implementing body for the Treaty on Open Skies, meets monthly at its Vienna headquarters.

Border management

The actions taken by the OSCE in border monitoring range from conflict prevention to post-conflict management, capacity building and institutional support.

Combating terrorism

With its expertise in conflict prevention, crisis management and early warning, the OSCE contributes to worldwide efforts in combating terrorism.

Conflict prevention

The OSCE works to prevent conflicts from arising and to facilitate lasting comprehensive political settlements for existing conflicts. It also helps with the process of rehabilitation in post-conflict areas.

Military reform

The OSCE's Forum for Security Co-operation provides a framework for political dialogue on military reform, while practical activities are conducted by field operations, as well as the Conflict Prevention Centre.

Policing

OSCE police operations are an integral part of the organization's efforts in conflict prevention and post-conflict rehabilitation.

Implementation

The OSCE was a rather small organization until selection by the international community to provide electoral organization to post war Bosnia and Herzegovina in early 1996. Ambassador Frowick was the first OSCE representative to initiate national election in September 1996, human rights issues and rule of law specifically designed to provide a foundation for judicial organization within Bosnia and Herzegovina.

The OSCE had regional offices and field offices, to include the office in Brcko in northeastern Bosnia and Herzegovina which remained in limbo until the Brcko Arbitration Agreement could be decided, finalized and implemented. Brcko become a "special district" and remains so today.

The OSCE essentially took the place of the United Nations in Bosnia and Herzegovina in part because the Bosnian leadership felt deep contempt for the UN efforts to stop the war which began in 1991 and ended in 1995. During the time the United Nations were attempting a political solution, thousands of UN troops were posted in and around Bosnia and Herzegovina with special emphasis on Sarajevo. From 1991 to 1995, over 200,000 Bosnians were killed, over one million displaced and another million as refugees.

The OSCE continues to have a presence and a number of initiatives to bring a sustained peace to the region.

=== Economic and environmental dimension (second dimension) ===
Activities in the economic and environmental dimension include the monitoring of developments related to economic and environmental security in OSCE participating States, with the aim of alerting them to any threat of conflict; assisting States in the creation of economic and environmental policies, legislation and institutions to promote security in the OSCE region.

Economic activities

Among the economic activities of the OSCE feature activities related to migration management, transport and energy security. Most activities are implemented in co-operation with partner organizations.

Environmental activities

The OSCE has developed a range of activities in the environmental sphere aimed at addressing ecologic threats to security in its participating States. Among the activities feature projects in the area of hazardous waste, water management and access to information under the Aarhus Convention.

=== Human dimension (third dimension) ===
The commitments made by OSCE participating States in the human dimension aim to ensure full respect for human rights and fundamental freedoms; to abide by the rule of law; to promote the principles of democracy by building, strengthening and protecting democratic institutions; and to promote tolerance throughout the OSCE region.

Combating trafficking in human beings

Since 2003, the OSCE has had an established mechanism for combating trafficking in human beings, as defined by Article 3 of the Palermo Protocol, which is aimed at raising public awareness of the problem and building the political will within participating states to tackle it effectively.

The OSCE actions against trafficking in human beings are coordinated by the Office of the Special Representative and Co-ordinator for Combating Trafficking in Human Beings. Maria Grazia Giammarinaro, a judge in the Criminal Court of Rome, took Office as the Special Representative in March 2010. From 2006 to 2009, this Office was held by Eva Biaudet, a former Finnish Minister of Health and Social Services. Biaudet currently serves as Finnish Ombudsman for Minorities. Her predecessor was former Austrian Minister Helga Konrad, who served as the first OSCE Special Representative for Combating Trafficking in Human Beings.

The activities around Combating Trafficking in Human Beings in the OSCE Region of the Office of the Special Representative include:

- Co-operation with governments, helping them to accept and act on their responsibilities for curbing trafficking in human beings;
- Providing governments with decision and policy-making aids and offering guidance on anti-trafficking management, with the aim of arriving at solutions tailored to the needs of the individual countries and in line with international standards;
- Assisting governments to develop the national anti-trafficking structures required for efficient internal and transnational co-operation;
- Raising awareness to draw attention to the complexity of the problem and to the need for comprehensive solutions;
- Considering all dimensions of human trafficking, namely trafficking for sexual exploitation, trafficking for forced and bonded labour, including domestic servitude, trafficking into forced marriages, trafficking in organs and trafficking in children;
- Ensuring the effective interaction of all agents and stake holders involved in the fight against human trafficking, ranging from governmental authorities, law enforcement officials to NGOs, and—last but not least—international organizations, as the agencies providing support thorough expertise and know-how;
- Guaranteeing the highest possible visibility of the OSCE's fight against human trafficking to focus attention on the issue.

Democratization

The OSCE claims to promote democracy and assist the participating states in building democratic institutions.

Education

Education programmes are an integral part of the organization's efforts in conflict prevention and post-conflict rehabilitation.

Elections

As part of its democratization activities, the OSCE carries out election assistance projects in the run-up to, during, and following elections. However, the effectiveness of such assistance is arguable—Kazakhstan, for example, despite being the former chair of the OSCE, is considered by many to be one of the least democratic countries in the world. Moreover, the recent democratic advances made in other Central Asian republics, notably Kyrgyzstan, have led to rumours of Soviet-style disruption of the Kyrgyz democratic process by, in particular, Kazakhstan and Russia. This may be in large part due to fears over the long-term stability of these countries' own quasi-dictatorships.

Gender equality

The equality of men and women is an integral part of sustainable democracy. The OSCE aims to provide equal opportunities for men and women and to integrate gender equality in policies and practices.

Human rights

The OSCE's human rights activities focus on such priorities as freedom of movement and religion, preventing torture and trafficking in persons.

National and international NGOs

OSCE could grant consultative status to NGOs and INGOs in the form of "Researcher-in-residence programme" (run by the Prague Office of the OSCE Secretariat): accredited representatives of national and international NGOs are granted access to all records and to numerous topical compilations related to OSCE field activities.

Media freedom

The OSCE observes relevant media developments in its participating states with a view to addressing and providing early warning on violations of freedom of expression.

Minority rights

Ethnic conflict is one of the main sources of large-scale violence in Europe today. The OSCE's approach is to identify and to seek early resolution of ethnic tensions, and to set standards for the rights of persons belonging to minority groups and High Commissioner on National Minorities has been established.

== OSCE Democracy Defender Award ==
The Democracy Defender Award honors a person or group for contributions to the promotion of democracy and the defense of human rights "in the spirit of Helsinki Final Act and other OSCE principles and commitments." The award was established in 2016 on the initiative of Ambassadors of 8 countries, and supported by the delegations of the 18 countries of the OSCE (22 countries in 2017).

| Year | Recipient | Nationality | Notes | Ref. |
|---|---|---|---|---|
| 2022 | ZMINA; Memorial | Ukraine; Russia | Ukrainian Human Rights Centre Zmina and to the Russian Memorial Human Rights Centre in recognition of their courageous and important efforts to promote human rights and democracy. | |
| 2020 | Viasna Human Rights Centre | Belarus | Belarusian organization established in 1996 which advocates for the rights of political prisoners in Belarus and against the government of Alexander Lukashenko. | |
| 2019 | Union of Informed Citizens (UIC) | Armenia | Armenian organization which intends to raise public awareness on important issues and reduce the impact of misinformation on decision-making. | |
| 2018 | CRTA | Serbia | Serbian organization established in 2002 to improve the democratic culture, the rule of law and the freedom of the Media. | |
| 2017 | Golos | Russia | Russian organization established in 2000 to protect the electoral rights of citizens and to foster civil society. | |
| 2016 | Oleksandra Matviychuk | Ukraine | Ukrainian activist, coordinator of Euromaidan SOS and leader of Civil Rights Center. | |

== See also ==
- Adapted Conventional Armed Forces in Europe Treaty
- Armenia–OSCE relations
- Azerbaijan–OSCE relations
- Commission on Security and Cooperation in Europe
- Conference on Interaction and Confidence-Building Measures in Asia
- Council of Europe
- European Union
- International Federation for Human Rights
- International organisations in Europe
- NATO
- Organization for Security and Co-operation in Europe statistics
- OSCE Minsk Group
- Silence procedure
- Treaty on Conventional Armed Forces in Europe
- Western European Union
