= Adapted Conventional Armed Forces in Europe Treaty =

Post-Cold War treaty

The Adapted Conventional Armed Forces in Europe Treaty is a post–Cold War adaptation of the Treaty on Conventional Armed Forces in Europe (CFE), signed on November 19, 1999, during the Organization for Security and Co-operation in Europe's (OSCE) 1999 Istanbul summit. The main difference with the earlier treaty is that the troop ceilings on a bloc-to-bloc basis (NATO vs. the Warsaw Pact) would be replaced with a system of national and territorial ceilings. Furthermore, the adapted treaty would provide for more inspections and new mechanisms designed to reinforce States Parties’ ability to grant or withhold consent for the stationing of foreign forces on their territory.

The Adapted Treaty will enter into force when all 30 states-parties have ratified the agreement. As of August 2006, only Belarus, Kazakhstan, Russia, and Ukraine have done so. NATO member-states link their ratification of the Adapted CFE Treaty with the fulfillment by Russia of the political commitments it undertook at the 1999 OSCE Istanbul Summit (so called "Istanbul commitments") to withdraw its forces from Georgia and Moldova.

Russia has strongly criticized this linkage, which it considers artificial, and has on several occasions questioned the relevance of the Adapted CFE Treaty, given its continued non-ratification by NATO states.

== Linkage between Russia's withdrawal and NATO's ratification ==
In the run-up to the OSCE's 1999 Istanbul summit, NATO members were concerned by three treaty compliance problems. First of all, they emphasized that the continuing existence of Russian equipment holdings in the "flank" region were well in excess of agreed Treaty limits. Secondly, they were opposed to a Russian military presence in Georgia—a presence which was beyond the level authorised by the Georgian authorities. Thirdly, they were concerned about the Russian military presence in Moldova which lacked the explicit consent of the Moldovan authorities. NATO members insisted on a package of measures designed to address these issues.

During the summit, 30 OSCE member states—including NATO member states and Russia—signed the adapted CFE treaty. Russia agreed to withdraw from the Republic of Moldova, reduce its equipment levels in Georgia and agree with the Georgian authorities on the modalities and duration of the Russian forces stationed on the territory of Georgia, and reduce their forces in the flanks to the agreed levels of the Adapted CFE Treaty. These agreements became known as the "Istanbul Commitments" and are contained in 14 Annexes to the CFE Final Act and within the 1999 Istanbul Summit Declaration.

Concerning Moldova, the Declaration states that CFE states-parties "welcome the commitment of the Russian Federation to complete withdrawal of the Russian forces from the territory of Moldova by the end of 2002" (emphasis added). Russia, while fulfilling the other obligations, steadily denied since 2002 that it ever made a clear commitment to withdraw its troops, but Russia did withdraw 58 trainloads of equipment and ammunition from Transdniestria. No further withdrawals have occurred since 2004. Russia argues that it has fulfilled all of its obligations by signing the agreements with Georgia to close the Batumi and Akhalkalaki bases and withdraw the Russian troops stationed there by the end of 2008. As long as not all troops are withdrawn from Georgia and Moldova, NATO members refuse to ratify the treaty. This includes the dismantling of the one remaining base (after 2008) in Georgia: the Gudauta base located in Abkhazia. This has been viewed as an attempt to postpone ratification. Abkhazia is a de facto independent break-away republic within the internationally recognized borders of Georgia. In 2002 and 2006 referendums were held in which Abkhazians voted by large margins for de jure independence.

== Timeline ==
- November 1999 – Russia and Georgia sign a treaty regarding the status of Russian soldiers remaining in Georgia.
- November 1999 – Russia and Moldova sign an agreement to address the status of Russian soldiers remaining in Moldova at the Second Conference to Review the Operation of the Treaty, in 2001.
- 2000 – Russia ratifies the agreement.
- 2001 – The Second Conference to Review the Operation of the Treaty occurs, but no NATO state had yet ratified the agreement.
- 2007 – Russian president Vladimir Putin declares that the Adapted Conventional Armed Forces in Europe treaty is dead, because NATO had not ratified the agreement.
- 2007 – NATO countries demand that Russia withdraw Russian soldiers from Moldova and Georgia before they will ratify the agreement.
- July 2007 – Russia suspends ratification.
- November 2007 – Russia withdraws from the treaty.

== Status ==
=== Signed ===
Signed on November 19, during the OSCE's 1999 Istanbul summit by 30 states: Armenia, Azerbaijan, Belarus, Belgium, Bulgaria, Canada, Czech Republic, Denmark, France, Georgia, Germany, Greece, Hungary, Iceland, Italy, Kazakhstan, Luxembourg, Moldova, the Netherlands, Norway, Poland, Portugal, Romania, Russia, Slovakia, Spain, Turkey, Ukraine, United Kingdom, and the United States.

Four states did not sign the treaty when they joined NATO, despite a preliminary agreement to do so: Slovenia and the three Baltic states: Lithuania, Estonia, and Latvia. These states are unable to do so because the treaty cannot be joined until all the original signatories have ratified it.

=== Ratified ===
Ratified by 4 of the 30 signatories:

- Belarus
- Kazakhstan
- Russia (Ratification suspended in 2007)
- Ukraine

Moldova and Georgia said they would not ratify it until Russia withdraws its forces from their territories, notably the Russian troops stationed in the breakaway republics of Abkhazia and Transnistria. This has become NATO countries reason to abstain from ratifying in 2007.

Russia suspended its ratification on July 14, 2007, amidst cooling relations between the U.S. and Russia.

== See also ==
- Organization for Security and Co-operation in Europe (OSCE)
- 1999 Istanbul summit
