= High Commissioner on National Minorities =

Office of the Organization for Security and Co-operation in Europe.

OSCE High Commissioner on National Minorities
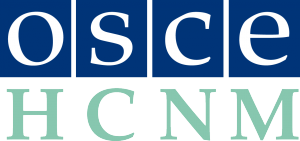
- Logo
- Headquarters: The Hague, Netherlands
- Type: Office within the Organization for Security and Co-operation in Europe

Leaders
  - High Commissioner: Christophe Kamp

Establishment
  - Founded: 8 July 1992
- Website https://www.osce.org/hcnm/

The office of the OSCE High Commissioner on National Minorities (HCNM) is charged with identifying and seeking early resolution of ethnic tension that might endanger peace, stability or friendly relations between and within the participating states of the Organization for Security and Co-operation in Europe.

The office was created on 8 July 1992, by the Helsinki Summit Meeting of the Conference on Security and Cooperation in Europe (CSCE), now known as the (OSCE), The HCNM focuses on the OSCE area and will alert the Organisation where a situation has the potential to develop into a conflict. The Organisation consists of 57 participating States across North America, Europe and Asia. The establishment of the HCNM is generally considered to be a “success story” and a useful instrument of conflict prevention.

== History ==
The creation of the office of HCNM was directly related to the political circumstances at the beginning of the 1990s. The Yugoslav Wars were ethnic conflicts that broke out after the collapse of the Berlin Wall and of Communism, and which eventually resulted in the break up of the country. Efforts of the CSCE, European Union and United Nations failed to bring peace. The frustration at being unable to prevent such a devastating human tragedy led to the Netherlands government proposing the post of the HCNM. This office would aim to prevent conflicts based on tensions with ethnic minorities. In regards to the Yugoslav tragedy, international efforts were deemed to have failed because of the limited knowledge of the international mediators of the ethnic situation. This often meant that tensions escalated because the international community did not fully understand the issues at play. Further, any international aid that was provided came too late. It was recognised that such tensions should be identified and addressed as early as possible in order to prevent escalation into endless conflict. The Yugoslav conflict also made clear that many conflicts around the world were rooted in tensions involving national minorities. It was against this background that the proposal for the office of the HCNM was presented.

=== Opposition to the proposal ===
Many concerns were raised in regards to the model put forward by the Netherlands. As a result, several major restrictions to the HCNM's role were implemented into the mandate.

States disagreed on whether the rights of national minorities were individual or group rights. Ultimately, there was a clear exclusion of individual cases through paragraph 5(c) of the HCNM mandate. This prohibits the High Commissioner from considering “violations of CSCE commitments with regard to an individual person belonging to a national minority”. Many states feared that the HCNM would become a sort of "ombudsman" for national minorities. The aim of the office was not to create a new human rights instrument, but to create a conflict prevention tool. This was emphasised in the title of the office: the High Commissioner on National Minorities, not for National Minorities.

Many states were also highly opposed to involvement by the HCNM in cases of terrorism. As a result, the HCNM was prohibited from considering ‘national minority issues in situations involving organized acts of terrorism’. The international community further decided that the HCNM should not be able to ‘communicate with and (...) acknowledge communications from any person or organization which practices or publicly condones terrorism or violence’. In some instances this clause has become a way for states to ban the HCNM from interfering with their minority problems.

=== Ambiguity in the mandate ===
The HCNM's mandate as defined at the Helsinki Summit meeting in 1992 contained many ambiguities, the most significant of which is the definition of “national minorities”. No clear guidance was given in the mandate on how to interpret this term. This was largely because the CSCE participating states could not come to an agreement on the definition of "national minorities", and therefore opted to provide no definition at all.

The first High Commissioner, Max van der Stoel, focused on clarifying and defining his mandate. He did this by consulting many experts on minority rights and international law, and thereby developing a set of guidelines and practices for overcoming the ambiguities in the mandate. Through the broadly defined mandate, he was able to approach the role in the best way he saw fit. The approach taken by van der Stoel came to define how his successors approached the role too. His definition of “national minorities” had three different elements. Firstly, a national minority could be distinguished from the rest of society through linguistic, ethnic or cultural characteristics. Secondly, that minority strived to protect and strengthen those characteristics which made up its identity. Finally, he referenced paragraph 32 of the 1990 CSCE Copenhagen Document, which emphasised that being a part of a national minority was a person's individual choice. In the approach taken by van der Stoel and his successors, there is no requirement that a national minority be a numerical minority in the population. In many cases a national minority will be a majority in certain countries or regions.

== Function ==
The main role of the HCNM is to identify and address tensions involving national minorities which could develop into a conflict. This involves “early warning” of potential conflict followed by “early action” to dissolve tensions. The mandate authorises the HCNM to assess ‘the role of the parties directly concerned, the nature of the tensions and recent developments therein and, where possible, the potential consequences for peace and stability within the OSCE area’. Her most important role is not necessarily to completely resolve all potential conflicts, but rather to manage them in a way that the tension between groups does not escalate but declines. This involves mediation as well as the introduction of sustainable solutions.

Ultimately, the role of the High Commissioner is one of preventative diplomacy. She must provide early warnings of escalating tensions as well as early action to prevent any further escalation. Tensions between different societal groups can arise over a variety of elements, such as ethnicity, religion, or language. The HCNM works to sort through these tensions and towards social cohesion, before those tensions escalate into conflicts. The first HCNM, Max van der Stoel, noted that the HCNM should aim to prevent disputes from arising into armed conflicts, but should also understand that in some cases the situation may go beyond the realm of preventative diplomacy. Where conflicts can only be resolved in the long term, a more comprehensive approach must be taken. This may result in the High Commissioner issuing an early warning notice to the Permanent Council, alongside a request for the OSCE to issue her an ‘ad hoc’ mandate for late prevention of the conflict. An early warning notice under paragraph 15 of the mandate has only been issued once before, in regards to the 1999 Kosovo crisis.

In order to promote social cohesion, the HCNM must provide advice and take actions that are context specific. Significant research should be undertaken about the specific society and ethnic groups involved in order to effectively respond to the situation. Van der Stoel always prepared extensively for any state involvement, often by organising a one- or two-day workshop with leading experts in several relevant areas. The importance of this approach arose due to the failures of the international community during the Yugoslav Wars, where a lack of understanding about the ethnic situation by international mediators often led to a worsening of the situation.

The work undertaken by the High Commissioners since the inception of the role is considered to have been largely successful. The role requires expertise, tools and experience in monitoring situations of potential tension, as well as in recognising signs of escalation. Such knowledge and skill is invaluable in regards to conflict prevention involving minorities, because these situations are often very precarious and complex. No inter-ethnic tension is alike, and each will involve different factors and historical and cultural influences. There is therefore a clear need for a dedicated office specialised in and focused on minority issues.

=== Methods used in conflict prevention ===
The HCNM employs several different techniques in order to achieve her purpose of conflict prevention. The High Commissioner works very closely with the particular state involved and with the leaders of the relevant parties. While the HCNM ultimately cannot enforce any compulsory action, there are many ways that the HCNM can assist the situation.

The High Commissioner will assist in preventing an escalating conflict by introducing a minimum standard of minority rights, which should be upheld by the state and other majority actors. She may also assist in implementing those standards and helping them become the norm in that state. There are seven sets of thematic recommendations that can provide a platform for better inter-ethnic relations and help to reduce tension. These include recommendations on education, linguistic rights, participation, kin-states, policing in multi-ethnic societies, minority languages in broadcast media, and integration and conflict prevention. The HCNM frequently recommends that states take measures to protect minority languages, as this is one of the major causes of inter-ethnic tension. However, the OSCE and HCNM also promote a policy of integration, which strives for a balance between protection of minority culture and the development of an overarching common identity. This involves integration policies such as encouragement to learn the state language. The High Commissioner also promotes education of national minority languages and religious practices as a way to prevent conflict. This is a way to foster an appreciation of diversity among communities and also to dissolve stereotypes about certain ethnic groups.

The HCNM will also focus on improving communication between the parties involved, including leaders of the state and leaders of the opposing national groups. This involves assisting processes of negotiations and ensuring participation by all relevant parties. When creating the role, it was recognised that the most frequent cause of hostile inter-ethnic relations was insufficient or distorted communication. The HCNM plays an important role in setting up lines of effective communication before hostile relations begin to develop.

In order to develop a peaceful society the High Commissioner strives to ensure that all minority groups are sufficiently involved in public life, and are fairly represented at national, regional and local levels. By ensuring that minority groups are involved in decision-making processes and that they enjoy some level of influence, states can prevent these groups from becoming marginalised. Active and effective participation also provides remedies for groups who feel their rights are being violated, and in doing so can prevent such groups from seeking remedies in a more violent manner.

Importantly, all governments may exercise a right of refusal against participation of the High Commissioner, and may prevent her from entering the country. In such a circumstance, the HCNM is to inform the OSCE.

== Involvement in Ukraine ==
The first HCNM, Max van der Stoel, was involved with inter-ethnic tensions in Ukraine between a substantial Russian minority and the Ukraine government from 1994 to 2001. His work during this time was considered largely successful in reducing tensions and building towards peaceful solutions. This conflict was multi layered and emphasised the importance of finding durable solutions in the search for peace. Following the disintegration of the USSR and Ukrainian independence in 1991, tensions began to arise as Ukraine sought to establish its identity. In particular, these uneasy relations were caused by historical Russian domination over Ukraine, as well as the prevalence of Russian language in Ukrainian life. While the HCNM was not the only influential actor in managing and resolving these issues, he played a critical role in establishing movement towards peace.

The flexibility of the HCNM's mandate and the nature of the role allowed van der Stoel to become involved in the tensions in Ukraine at a very early stage. He was able to craft a tactful and creative approach to dealing with the precarious issues that had arisen at that stage. The success of his work there is in large part credited to his ability to build a relationship of trust with the parties involved and to approach all issues from the basis of impartiality.

The HCNM was invited to Ukraine by the government in February 1994. In Ukraine at that time there were several minority issues that were causing tension. The HCNM was involved in managing the relations between the Russian minority and the Ukrainian majority, the status of Crimea within Ukraine, and resettlement of the Crimean Tatars. Importantly, descent into violent conflict was prevented in all areas. However, while the HCNM's work was largely successful, it also exposed the limitations of the role. The Ukrainian government was unwilling to implement the majority of his recommendations, even though it was consistently willing to engage with the HCNM. Therefore, while the HCNM ultimately played a critical role in conflict prevention in Ukraine, his ability to secure a sustainable solution across all areas of tension was often limited.

== Commissioners ==
- Max van der Stoel (Netherlands) — 1993–2001
- Rolf Ekéus (Sweden) — 2001–2007
- Knut Vollebæk (Norway) — 2007–2013
- Astrid Thors (Finland) — 2013–2016
- Lamberto Zannier (Italy) — 2017–2020
- Kairat Abdrakhmanov (Kazakhstan) — 2020-2024
- Christophe Kamp (Netherlands) — since 2024

== See also ==
- Integration and Development Centre for Information and Research
