= Erastus Ekitela Lokaale =

Kenyan diplomat

Kenyan Permanent Representative to the United Nations
- Incumbent
- Assumed office 12 August 2024
- Appointed by: William Ruto
- Preceded by: Martin Kimani

Speaker of The County Assembly of Turkana County
- In office 2017–2022
- Governor: Josphat Nanok
- Preceded by: Geoffrey Kaituko
- Succeeded by: Christopher Doye Nakuleu

Personal details
- Born: 1978 (age 47–48) Turkana, Kenya
- Education: University of Nairobi (LLB); University of Warwick (LLM)
- Profession: Lawyer

Erastus Ekitela Lokaale (born 1978) is a Kenyan diplomat, lawyer, and politician currently serving as the Permanent Representative of the Republic of Kenya to the United Nations, New York.

== Early life and education ==
Ekitela was born in Turkana.

He holds an LLM in International Development Law and Human Rights from the University of Warwick, an LLB from the University of Nairobi and a postgraduate diploma in Law from the Kenya School of Law.

== Career ==
Lokaale began his career at the Centre for Minority Rights Development (CEMIRIDE) from 2002 to 2004. He then worked as a programme officer at the Kenya Human Rights Commission between 2004 and 2006. From 2007 to 2008, he served as a human rights officer with Oxfam’s Somalia programme. He later joined the United Nations Development Programme (UNDP) in Kenya, where he worked as a programme specialist from 2009 to 2014 and as a programme manager from 2014 to 2017 on programmes related to governance, human rights, and civic education.

Lokaale was elected Speaker of the County Assembly of Turkana in 2017 and served until 2022. During this period, he also chaired the Frontier Counties Development Council’s County Assemblies Speakers’ Caucus.

In 2023, he served as climate change advisor in the Ministry of Foreign and Diaspora Affairs from July to December. Lokaale also headed the Presidential Secretariat of the Tumaini Peace Initiative, a High-Level Mediation for South Sudan domiciled at the State Department for Foreign Affairs of the Republic of Kenya.

Lokaale was appointed Permanent Representative of Kenya to the United Nations in March 2024. He presented his credentials to UN Secretary General António Guterres on 12 August 2024. He took over from Martin Kimani who had served as Kenya's permanent representative since December 2020.
