= Martin Kimani =

Kenyan government official and diplomat

Mbūgua Martin Kìmani
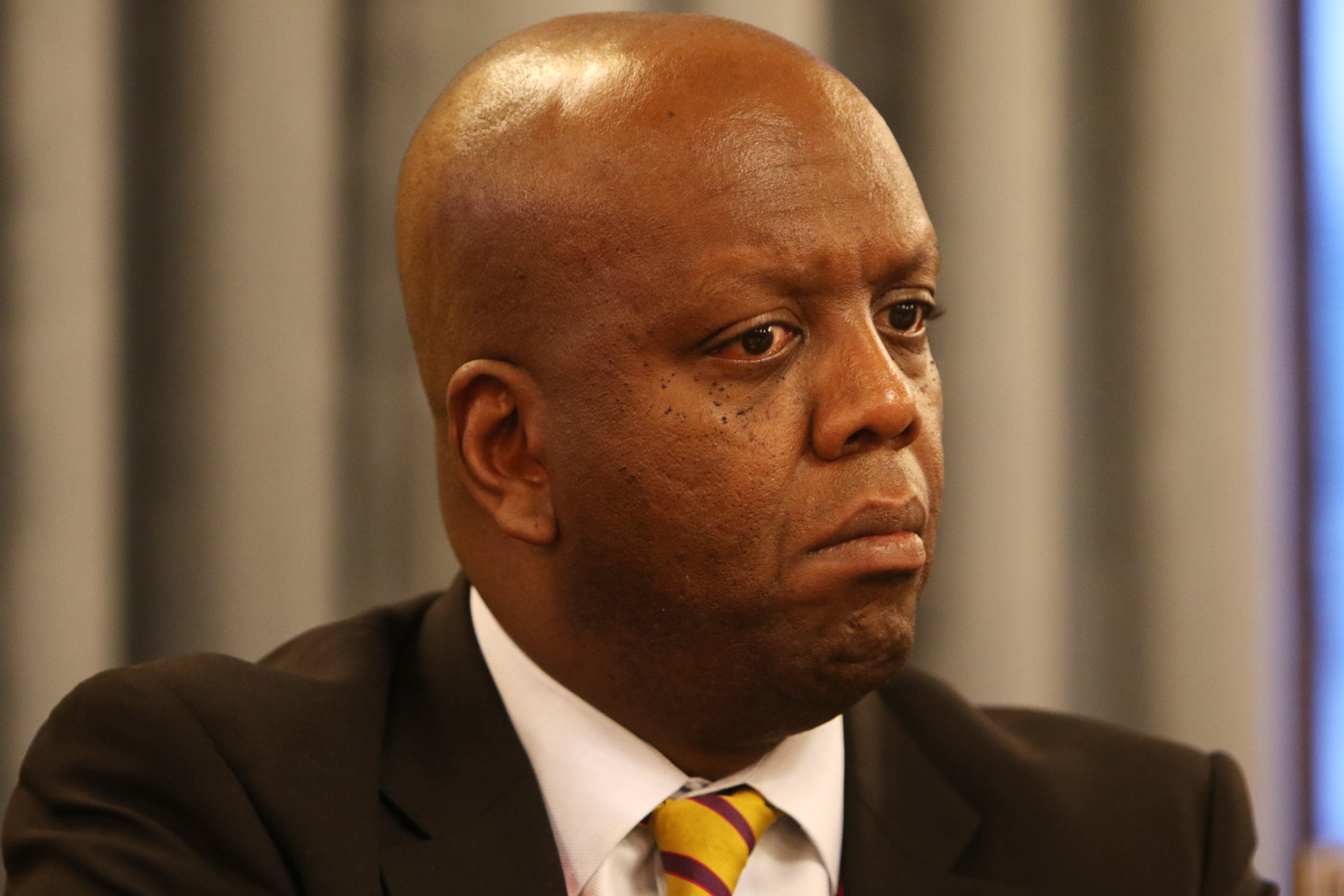
- Kimani at a DFID event 19 October 2016 on freedom of religion and prevention of violent extremism

Kenyan Permanent Representative to the United Nations
- In office December 2020 – March 2024
- Appointed by: Uhuru Kenyatta
- Succeeded by: Erastus Ekitela Lokaale

Personal details
- Born: Martin Kimani Mbugua; 1971 (age 54–55) Mombasa, Kenya
- Education: University of New Hampshire (BA); King's College London (MA, PhD)
- Known for: 2022 speech about Russia's actions in Ukraine

Mbūgua Martin Kìmani (born 1971) is a Kenyan government official and diplomat who has been serving as Assistant Secretary-General of the United Nations for Africa at the United Nations Secretariat since 2026. In this capacity, he is part of the United Nations Department of Political and Peacebuilding Affairs.

Kimani previously served as Kenya's Permanent Representative to the United Nations since December 2020. He previously served as the Director of the National Counter Terrorism Centre and as a Special Envoy for Countering Violent Extremism in Kenya.

== Early life ==
Kìmani was born in 1971 in Mombasa.

Kìmani has a bachelor's degree from the University of New Hampshire (1996). He has a master's degree (2003) and a PhD (2013) in War Studies from King's College London, University of London.

He wrote his master's thesis on oil marketing in Kenya. His PhD thesis was about the role of Christian symbolism, the Catholic Church, and racialism in the 1994 Rwandan genocide.

== Career ==
=== Previous roles ===
Kìmani has worked in Nairobi, Addis Ababa, and New York City and has been employed by the United Nations Human Settlements Programme and the United Nations Environment Programme.

He was an Associate Fellow at the Conflict, Security & Development Group at King's College London.

From April 2011 to December 2012, Kìmani was the Director of the Intergovernmental Authority on Development Conflict Early Warning and Response Mechanism in Ethiopia.

Kìmani was Kenya's Permanent Representative to the United Nations, serving from December 2020 to May 2024. In this role, he chaired the Executive Board of the UN Development Programme (UNDP), UN Population Fund (UNFPA), and UN Office for Project Services (UNOPS). He was president of the United Nations Security Council for October 2021.

=== Current roles ===
As of 14 September, 2026, Kimani is currently the Assistant Secretary-General of the United Nations for Africa in the Departments of Political and Peacebuilding Affairs and Peace Operations.

Kìmani was appointed president and CEO of The Africa Center in New York City in 2025.

Kìmani is the Kenyan Presidential Special Envoy for Countering Violent Extremism, and was appointed as the Director of Kenya's National Counter Terrorism Centre in 2015.

He became the secretary for the Building Bridges Initiative in December 2018.

==== 22 February 2022 speech ====
Kìmani delivered a speech to the UN Security Council on 22 February 2022, in which he criticised Russia's recognition of separatist-held areas of Ukraine, and drew comparisons between the borders of Europe and those of Africa, saying:

"This situation echoes our history. Kenya and almost every African country was birthed by the ending of empire. Our borders were not of our own drawing (...). Today, across the border of every single African country, live our countrymen with whom we share deep (...) bonds. At independence, had we chosen to pursue states at the basis of ethnic, racial or religious homogeneity, we would still be waging bloody wars these many decades later. Instead, we agreed that we would settle on the borders that we inherited (...), rather than form nations that looked ever backward into history with a dangerous nostalgia, we chose to look forward (...). We believe that all states formed from empires that have collapsed or retreated, have many peoples in them yearning for integration with peoples in neighbouring states. This is normal and understandable. (...) However, Kenya rejects such a yearning from being pursued by force (...). We rejected irredentism and expansionism on any basis (...), we reject it again today."

The speech went viral on social media.

== Writing ==
Kìmani's writing has been published in Chimurenga, Farafina, Granta, Juxtapoz, Kwani, Süddeutsche Zeitung, and The East African, and The Guardian.

His book The Work of War was published by Granta Books online.

== Awards and fellowships ==
Kìmani was awarded the honour of Elder of the Order of the Burning Spear by the President of Kenya in 2016.

Kìmani is a Fellow of the Aspen Global Leadership Network and of the Africa Leadership Initiative.

In 2013, Kìmani was a Distinguished African Visiting Fellow at the South African Institute of International Affairs.

== Family life ==
Kìmani and his wife June Arunga Kimani have two children.

== See also ==
- Presidency of the United Nations Security Council
- Prelude to the Russian invasion of Ukraine
