= Reactions to the 2021–2022 Russo-Ukrainian crisis =

Many states, international organizations, and civil society actors worldwide had expressed their reactions to the then-escalating crisis between Russia and Ukraine that started in March 2021. The crisis eventually culminated in a Russian invasion of Ukraine, beginning on 24 February 2022.

== Ukraine ==
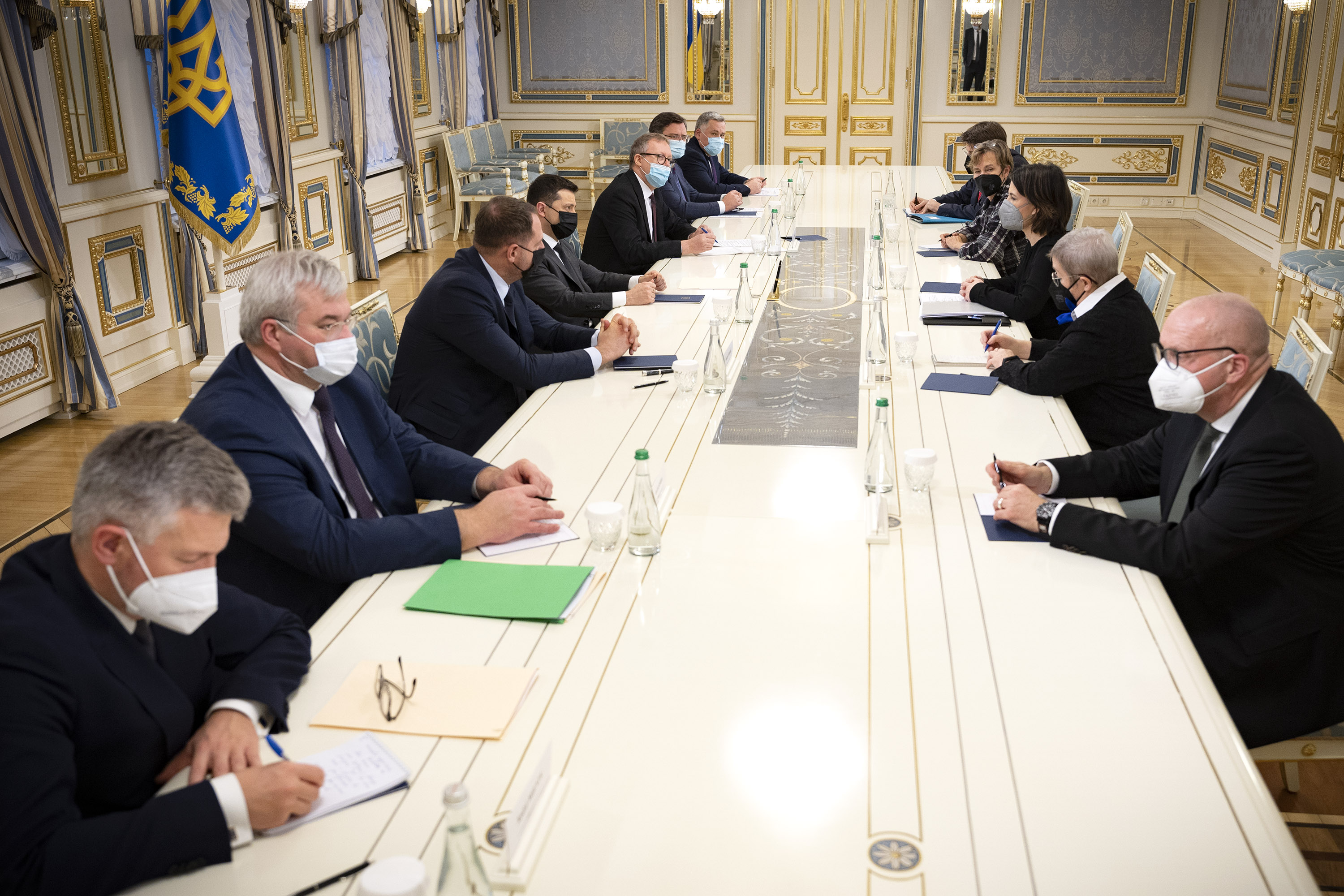
Ukrainian President Volodymyr Zelenskyy meets with German Foreign Minister Annalena Baerbock in Kyiv on 17 January 2022

In an interview with the French newspaper Libération in April 2021, Ukrainian Foreign Minister Dmytro Kuleba said that provocations by Russia with the relocation of troops to the border with Ukraine and the aggravation of the situation in the east are the most serious since the attack on Ukrainian sailors in the Kerch Strait in November 2018. At the same time, the current threat from Russia was more dangerous. In an interview with the Spanish news agency EFE, Kuleba said that Ukraine did not want a war with Russia and was not preparing for any escalation in Donbas at the time. In particular, it was not preparing any offensives or military operations. During renewed tensions in January 2022, Kuleba stated that any reckless step of the Russian Federation or a new round of violence on its part would cost it dearly. Kuleba said that Russia continued to increase its military presence along the Ukrainian-Russian border, in the occupied territories and in the seas of Ukraine. According to him, Russia was gathering troops in three directions, including in the northeast of Ukraine; in Crimea, in the south; and in the Donbas, in the east. Kuleba also added that in recent weeks, Russia had significantly intensified its propaganda, which dehumanizes Ukrainians and sows hatred for Ukraine. On 22 January 2022, Kuleba accused Germany of "undermining" unity among the country's allies and of "encouraging" Russian President Putin to attack Ukraine by refusing to deliver weapons to Ukraine.

Oleksii Danilov, Secretary of the National Security and Defense Council of Ukraine, stated that Ukraine seeks to resolve the conflict in the east of the country primarily through political and diplomatic means. "Ukraine currently has no plan to return the temporarily occupied territories by military means, our task is to resolve the conflict exclusively through political and diplomatic means," he said. "Everything else is a pure information war of the Russian Federation, which they are waging not only on our territory but throughout Europe."

In September 2021, Ukraine's Naftogaz CEO Yuriy Vitrenko accused Russia of using natural gas as a "geopolitical weapon". Vitrenko stated that "A joint statement from the United States and Germany said that if the Kremlin used gas as a weapon, there would be an appropriate response. We are now waiting for the imposition of sanctions on a 100% subsidiary of Gazprom, the operator of Nord Stream 2."

In November 2021, Kyrylo Budanov, the head of Ukraine's Chief Directorate of Intelligence of the Ministry of Defence, said that Russia was preparing for an attack by the end of January or beginning of February 2022.

On 4 November, a new defence minister was approved — former Deputy Prime Minister – Minister for the Reintegration of Temporarily Occupied Territories Oleksii Reznikov, who participated in the meetings of the Trilateral Contact Group on behalf of Ukraine.

In January 2022, Ukrainian President Volodymyr Zelenskyy said in a video message that the country's citizens should not panic and appealed to the media to be "methods of mass information and not mass hysteria."

Former leader of the "Right Sector", Dmytro Yarosh said on Facebook on January 24 that in the event of a Russian strike on Ukraine from the territory of the Republic of Belarus, Ukrainian fighters will turn their lives into hell:

Belarusian friends! "Dances" and "peaceful Belarusian partisan" are long over for you... You are being killed, raped, mocked... You are patient ... Maybe enough? Now the Kremlin is using you as provocateurs in the war with Ukraine... And will you die for Putin's interests? We, Ukrainians, respect and love Belarusians. But if we are attacked from your territory, we will turn your "peaceful" lacquey life into hell.

— Dmytro Yarosh

On 24 January 2022, Oleksiy Danilov, the secretary of Ukraine's National Security and Defense Council, said that the movement of Russian troops near Ukraine's border was "not news" and "we don't see any grounds for statements about a full-scale offensive on our country." According to Danilov, the implementation of the Minsk agreements, in particular the broad autonomy to the rebel-held Donbas, "means the country's destruction. When they were signed under the Russian gun barrel — and the German and the French watched — it was already clear for all rational people that it's impossible to implement those documents."

On 25 January 2022, Defense Minister Oleksii Reznikov said he saw no immediate threat of a full-scale Russian invasion of Ukraine, insisting that the threat had not significantly increased in eight years as "the Russian army ha[d] not formed a strike group that would be able to carry out an invasion". Ukrainian Deputy Defense Minister Hanna Maliar stated the variety of Russian troops massed on Ukraine's borders "are not enough for a full-scale invasion."

In late January 2022, Zelenskyy went on to accuse Ukraine's western allies of "sowing unrest with predictions of imminent war." On 28 January 2022, Ukrainian President Volodymyr Zelenskyy called on the West not to create a "panic" in his country over a potential Russian invasion, adding that constant warnings of an "imminent" threat of invasion were putting the economy of Ukraine at risk. Zelenskyy stated that "we do not see a bigger escalation" than in early 2021 when the first Russian military build-up began. On 2 February, the US White House announced it would no longer describe the potential invasion as "imminent". On 12 February 2022, in response to the White House's "imminent" Russian invasion warnings, Zelenskyy asserted that "in the information space, there is too much information about a deep, full-scale invasion from Russia. The best friend of our enemy is panic in our country, and all that information which helps create only panic doesn't help us."

On 19 February 2022, speaking at the Munich Security Conference 2022, Volodymyr Zelenskyy criticized the "policy of appeasement" towards Russia and called on Western countries to help. He also declared that Ukraine would not respond to provocations by Russian-backed militants in Donbas, following the death of two Ukrainian soldiers by separatists forces. On 22 February 2022, Zelenskyy said he would consider severing Ukraine's diplomatic relations with Russia.

== Russia ==
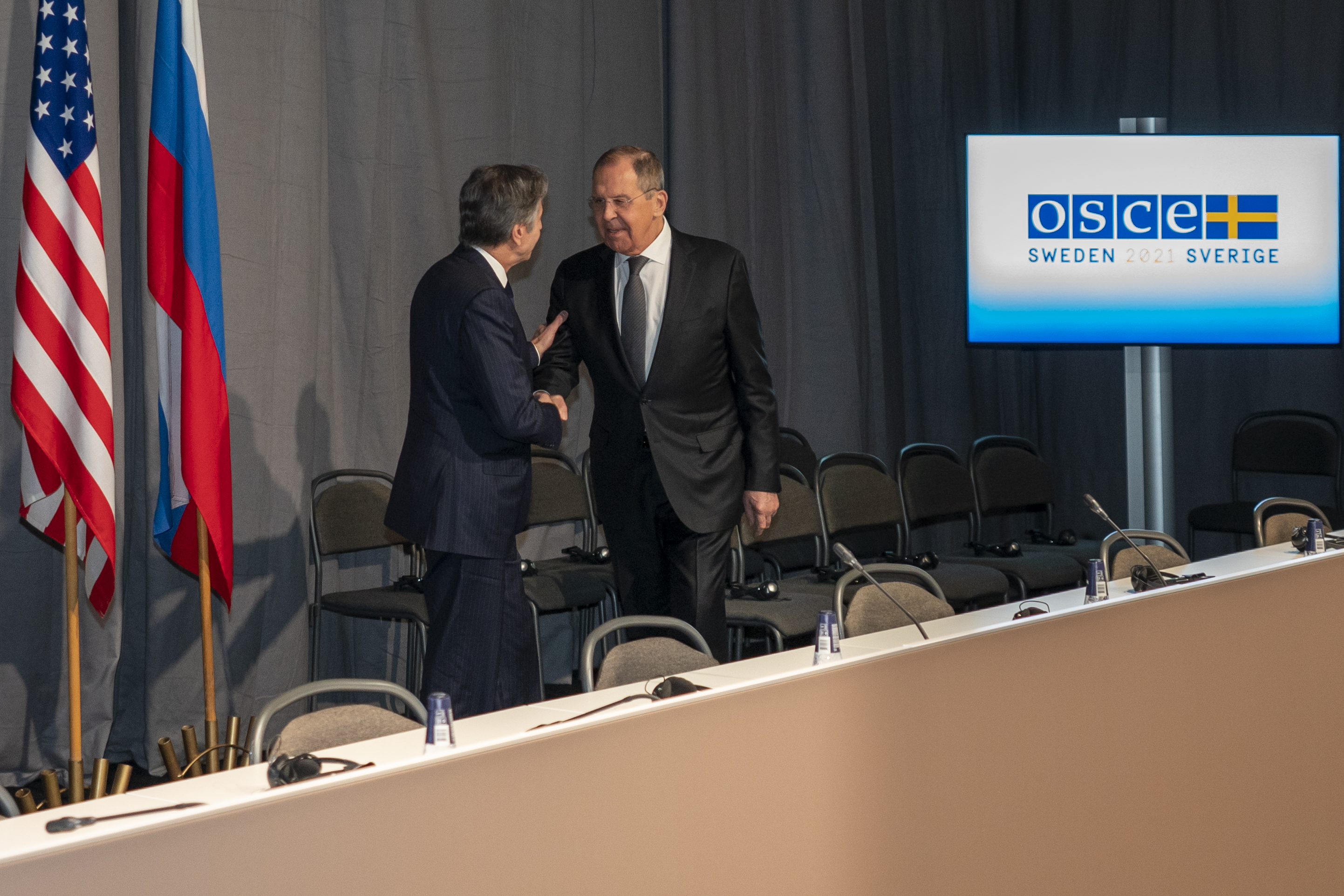
Russian Foreign Minister Sergey Lavrov meets with U.S. Secretary of State Antony Blinken on 2 December 2021

The Kremlin has repeatedly denied that it has any plans to invade Ukraine. Despite the Russian military build-ups, Russian officials over months repeatedly denied that Russia had plans to invade Ukraine.

Russian President Vladimir Putin dismissed such fears as "alarmist". The Russian embassy in Washington, D.C. called the movements of Russian troops a "sovereign right" and said in a Facebook post: "Once again we emphasize: Russia is not going to attack anyone." Sergei Naryshkin, director of Russia's Foreign Intelligence Service, dismissed reports of a possible invasion of Ukraine asserting that it was "malicious propaganda by the US State Department". Putin's foreign policy adviser Yury Ushakov dismissed fears of a military escalation as "nonsense", saying "We have the right to move the troops on our territory."

Russian Chief of General Staff Valery Gerasimov said "information about Russia's alleged impending invasion of Ukraine is a lie." According to Gerasimov, "Kyiv is not fulfilling the Minsk Agreements. The Ukrainian armed forces are touting that they have started to employ US-supplied Javelin anti-tank missile systems in Donbas and are also using Turkish reconnaissance/strike drones. As a result, the already tense situation in the east of that country is further deteriorating."

On 12 July 2021, Russian President Vladimir Putin wrote an article on Kremlin.ru, claiming that "Russians and Ukrainians were one people – a single whole" and wrote a long dissertation on the common origins of Russians, Belarusians and Ukrainians in medieval Kievan Rus' and their history through the century, concluding that "true sovereignty of Ukraine is possible only in partnership with Russia". He also argued that the Ukrainian leadership had "wasted and frittered away the achievements of many generations", accusing them of imposing a nationalist, anti-Russian sentiment against the will of the Ukrainian people. The article received a detailed response from British Defence Secretary Ben Wallace on Gov.uk on 17 January 2022.

On 30 November 2021, Russian President Vladimir Putin stated that an expansion of NATO's presence in Ukraine, especially the deployment of any long-range missiles capable of striking Russian cities or missile defense systems similar to those in Romania and Poland, would be a "red line" issue for Russia. Putin asked U.S. President Joe Biden for legal guarantees that NATO wouldn't expand eastward or put "weapons systems that threaten us in close vicinity to Russian territory." According to Putin, "If some kind of strike systems appear on the territory of Ukraine, the flight time to Moscow will be seven to 10 minutes, and five minutes in the case of a hypersonic weapon being deployed."

Dmitry Peskov, a spokesman for Russian President Vladimir Putin, said that the security of Russians, including in the occupied Donbas is a priority for Vladimir Putin. Peskov denied allegations that Russia is preparing for a possible invasion of Ukraine.

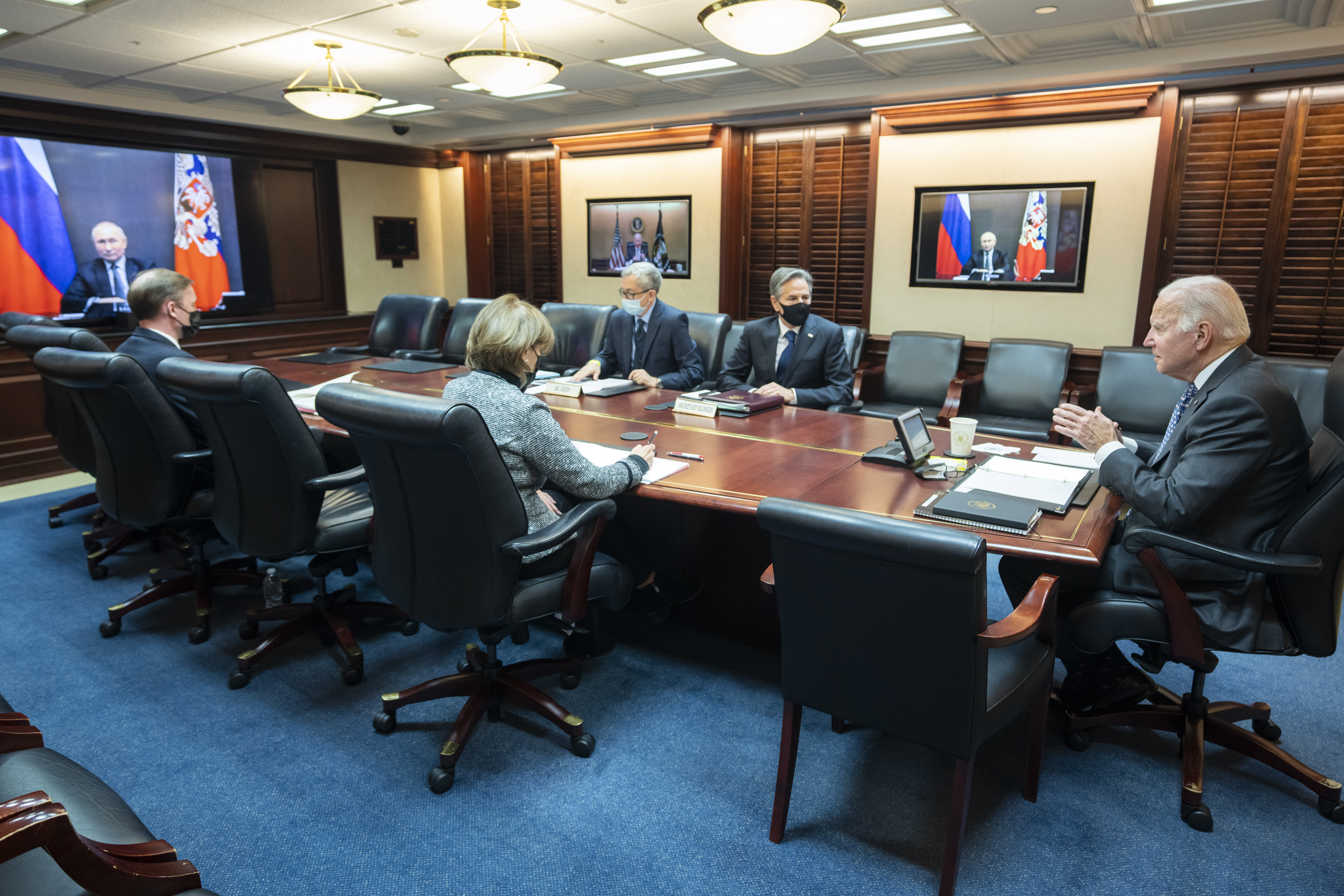
Russian President Vladimir Putin holds a video call with U.S. President Joe Biden on 7 December 2021

Dmitry Kozak, Deputy Head of the Russian Presidential Administration and a parliamentarian at the level of political advisers, said that the intensification of hostilities in Donbas could be the beginning of the end of Ukraine. The same applies to Ukraine's accession to NATO.

Deputy Foreign Minister Sergei Ryabkov said: "They talk about the high price, but never call it. What they have done so far, we have, firstly, studied well, and secondly, adapted. We do not think that at all can the following terminology should be used: price, retribution, etc. We are simply defending our interests and the interests of our citizens, the Russian-speaking population, we will continue to defend them". Ryabkov said Russia has "no intention of attacking, staging an offensive on or invading Ukraine." Asked about the possibility of Russian military deployment to Cuba and Venezuela, Ryabkov said "it all depends on the actions by our US counterparts".

On 19 January 2022, Russian deputy foreign minister Sergei Ryabkov said that Russia does "not want and will not take any action of aggressive character. We will not attack, strike, [sic] invade, 'whatever' Ukraine." Russia accused Ukraine of not implementing Minsk agreements reached in 2015 with the aim of establishing peace in Donbas.

Dmitry Medvedev, a deputy head of Russia's Security Council, told Russian media that "Cuba and Venezuela are aiming to come out of isolation and restore normal relations with the U.S. to a certain extent, so there can't be any talk about setting up a base there as happened during the Soviet times."

In December 2021, a Levada Center poll found that 48% of Russians believed that the U.S. and NATO were responsible for the Russo-Ukrainian crisis, while 16% blamed Ukraine and just 4% blamed Russia.

In January 2022, the United States accused Russia of sending saboteurs into Ukraine to stage "a false-flag operation" that would create a pretext for Russia to invade Ukraine. Russian Foreign Minister Sergey Lavrov dismissed the U.S. claim as "total disinformation." On 4 February 2022, Lavrov dismissed as "nonsense" and "craziness" allegations by the United States that Russia was preparing a fake video of the Ukrainian forces attacking the separatist-held Donbas as a pretext for starting a war in Ukraine.

On 13 January 2022, Russian political journalist Anton Krasovsky, director of broadcasting in Russian on the RT channel, threatened to burn the Constitution of Ukraine on Khreshchatyk because of the course prescribed in it for joining NATO.

Russian opposition leader Alexei Navalny wrote in several letters to Time magazine that the West keeps falling into Putin's traps and "Instead of ignoring this nonsense, the U.S. accepts Putin's agenda and scrambles to organize some meetings."

On 24 January 2022, Russia began its naval exercise in the Baltic Sea involving communications, air defense, anti-submarine defense and combat exercises. Anti-terror groups were also participating from the Baltic Fleet. In late January 2022, Nikolai Zhuravlev, vice speaker of the Federation Council, warned that Europe would not receive natural gas, petroleum and metals from Russia in the event that Russia was disconnected from the SWIFT international payment system, moreover such a move could not be feasible as it would require consent of all the countries participating in this system.

In August 2021, Russian Security Council secretary and Putin's close ally Nikolai Patrushev predicted that the United States would abandon its allies in Ukraine just as it abandoned its allies in Afghanistan, saying that "...Kyiv is obsequiously serving the interests of its overseas patrons, striving to get into NATO. But was the ousted pro-American regime in Kabul saved by the fact that Afghanistan had the status of a principal U.S. ally outside NATO? (No). A similar situation awaits supporters of the American choice in Ukraine." In late January 2022, during a visit to mark the anniversary of the end of the Siege of Leningrad during the Second World War, Patrushev asserted that the idea that Russia is "threatening Ukraine" was "absolutely ridiculous" and added: "We don't want war. We don't need that at all."

According to Maxim Suchkov, acting director of the Institute for International Studies at Moscow's MGIMO University, "the Russian military deployments alongside the Ukrainian border at this moment are not about invading Ukraine. ... wars are fought to achieve certain political goals, not just for the hell of it."

A few weeks before the invasion of Ukraine, Putin's former advisor and Kremlin insider Sergei Markov claimed it would not be a "war against Ukraine, but to liberate Ukraine" from the pro-Western government that took power in 2014, adding that "a military operation now would prevent a wider war in future."

In February 2022, Putin warned that Ukraine's accession to NATO could embolden Ukraine to reclaim control over Russian-annexed Crimea or areas ruled by pro-Russian separatists in Donbas, saying "Imagine that Ukraine is a NATO member and a military operation [to regain Crimea] begins. What - are we going to fight with NATO? Has anyone thought about this?"

On 7 February 2022, Putin said at a joint press conference with French President Emmanuel Macron that "A number of [Macron's] ideas, proposals ... are possible as a basis for further steps. We will do everything to find compromises that suit everyone." Putin promised not to carry out new military initiatives near Ukraine.

On 12 February 2022, Russian Foreign Minister Sergey Lavrov accused the United States and its allies of waging a "propaganda campaign" about Russian invasion of Ukraine.

Valentina Matviyenko, Chairwoman of the Federation Council, said that without strict implementation of the Minsk agreements Ukraine "would be doomed to live in its current state: with a burden of confrontation with Russia, hit by internal conflict, with weak state institutions that are unable to properly govern the country."

On 26 February 2022, Russia had blocked access to Twitter, and Facebook the day prior. Russia claimed that Facebook was censoring speech, while Facebook alleges that the country requested the platform to stop fact-checking Russian-aligned media posts.

On 7 February 2022, Putin said at a joint press conference with French president Emmanuel Macron: "A number of [Macron's] ideas, proposals [...] are possible as a basis for further steps. We will do everything to find compromises that suit everyone." On 12 February 2022, Russian Foreign Minister Sergey Lavrov described Western "demands to remove Russian troops from Russian territory" as "regrettable". On 11 February 2022, UK Defense Secretary Ben Wallace held a meeting with Russian Defense Minister Sergei Shoigu and General Valery Gerasimov, with Shoigu denying plans of a Russian invasion of Ukraine and Wallace supporting the implementation of the Minsk agreements "as a clear way forward".

Two days after the start of the full-scale invasion, MEP and former Estonian military commander Riho Terras shared a Ukrainian intelligence report containing leaked information of an alleged meeting between Putin and oligarchs in the Urals. Commenting on the report, Terras claimed that "Putin is furious, he thought that the whole war would be easy and everything would be done in 1–4 days." Politico hypothesised that the Russian president hoped to imitate "the relative ease with which the militants took control of the Afghan capital within days of the Western retreat", which "made Ukraine seem a tantalizing prospect. Perhaps Putin thought he'd roll into Kyiv the way the Taliban rolled into Kabul".

According to sources close to the Kremlin, most of Putin's close advisers opposed the invasion, and even Putin's hawkish ally Nikolai Patrushev advised Putin to give diplomacy another chance three days before the invasion, but Putin overruled them all. Information gathered from Russian sources indicated that the invasion had been planned for almost a year and that the Russian government had invested a significant amount of resources in its preparation. In a report published in mid-December 2022, Ukraine's Main Directorate of Intelligence revealed that its intelligence suggested that the FSB had repeatedly urged chief of staff Valery Gerasimov to initiate the invasion but that Putin had ordered Gerasimov to postpone the invasion on at least three occasions, the last time in mid-February 2022.

=== Russian citizens ===
==== Anti-war ====
In a video posted to YouTube on 11 April 2021, Russian journalist Alexander Nevzorov predicted that the Russian invasion of Ukraine would end in tragedy and humiliation for Russia. He also predicted fierce Ukrainian resistance. On 22 March 2022, he was charged under Russia's "false information" law after publishing information that Russian forces shelled a maternity hospital in Mariupol.

A statement was issued on 24 February 2022 by the Russian government that anti-war protesters found demonstrating against the invasion could be arrested for organizing, and to not take part in the "unauthorized protests". One protest monitoring group OVD-Info reported that more than 960 anti-war protestors had been detained by 9 pm on 24 February.

Russian rapper Oxxxymiron announced he would cancel six concerts in Moscow and St. Petersburg in response to the invasion.

State Duma deputy Mikhail Matveev voted in favor of the recognition of the Donetsk and Luhansk People's Republics but later denounced the 2022 Russian invasion of Ukraine, stating "I voted for peace, not for war. I wanted #Russia to become a shield so that #Donbas would not be bombed, not for #Kyiv to be bombed."

Lyudmila Narusova, a member of the State Duma, on 27 February stated in a television interview: "I do not identify myself with those representatives of the state that speak out in favor of the war. I think they themselves do not know what they are doing. They are following orders without thinking." She also stated that Russian soldiers in Ukraine lay "unburied; wild, stray dogs gnawing on bodies that in some cases cannot be identified because they are burned."

==== Intellectuals ====
On 30 January 2022, 90 Russian intellectuals, including Lev Ponomaryov, Valery Borshchyov, Svetlana Gannushkina, Leonid Gozman, Liya Akhedzhakova and Andrey Makarevich issued a public statement in Echo of Moscow opposing the Russian government's threats of a full invasion of Ukraine. They stated that the authorities had not consulted the public and that state media was uniquely pro-war. They objected to presenting war as being inevitable. Ponomaryov, Gannushkina and their co-signees strongly objected to an attack on Ukraine as unjustified and immoral. They predicted the development of a Russian mass anti-war movement and promised to do their best to prevent the war. More intellectuals and activists signed the anti-war statement. As of 7 February 2022, the statement had been signed by 5000 Russian intellectuals.

On 20 February, Ponomaryov and seven others, including Yuri Samodurov, held individual protests in Pushkinskaya Square in Moscow, with banners declaring "Schools and hospitals instead of bombs and shells", "Hands off Ukraine", "Down with the Chekists", "Russia, don't touch Ukraine", "No war with Ukraine", and "Freedom for Ukrainian political prisoners". The eight protestors were arrested.

==== Military ====
On 31 January, retired Colonel General Leonid Ivashov published a statement on behalf of the All-Russian Officers Assembly, a nationalist association of retired and reserve officers. The statement opposed the Russian threat to attack Ukraine, describing it as a "criminal policy of provoking a war". The statement argued that neither Ukraine nor NATO was a threat to Russia, but instead an attack by Russia would threaten Russia's existence as a state, and would risk escalating into a war between Russia and NATO. Russia was seen as threatened by "the unviability of the state model, the complete incapacity and lack of professionalism of the system of power and administration, the passivity and disorganisation of society." The statement called for Putin to resign.

== Belarus ==
The President of Belarus, Alexander Lukashenko, has stated that his country "does not want war", but if someone "pulls it, imposes sanctions or intimidates it", it will "almost give up" because, in his words, they are invincible. He also stated that he would send "a whole contingent of the Belarusian army" to the border with Ukraine, because "Ukrainians allegedly began to draw troops there."

On January 18, the Digital Forensic Research Lab of the Atlantic Council expert group published a review of the arrival of Russian troops in the Republic of Belarus. In particular, it was about unloading Russian Hurricane multiple rocket launchers at the Rechitsa station in the Gomel region north of Kyiv.

== NATO ==
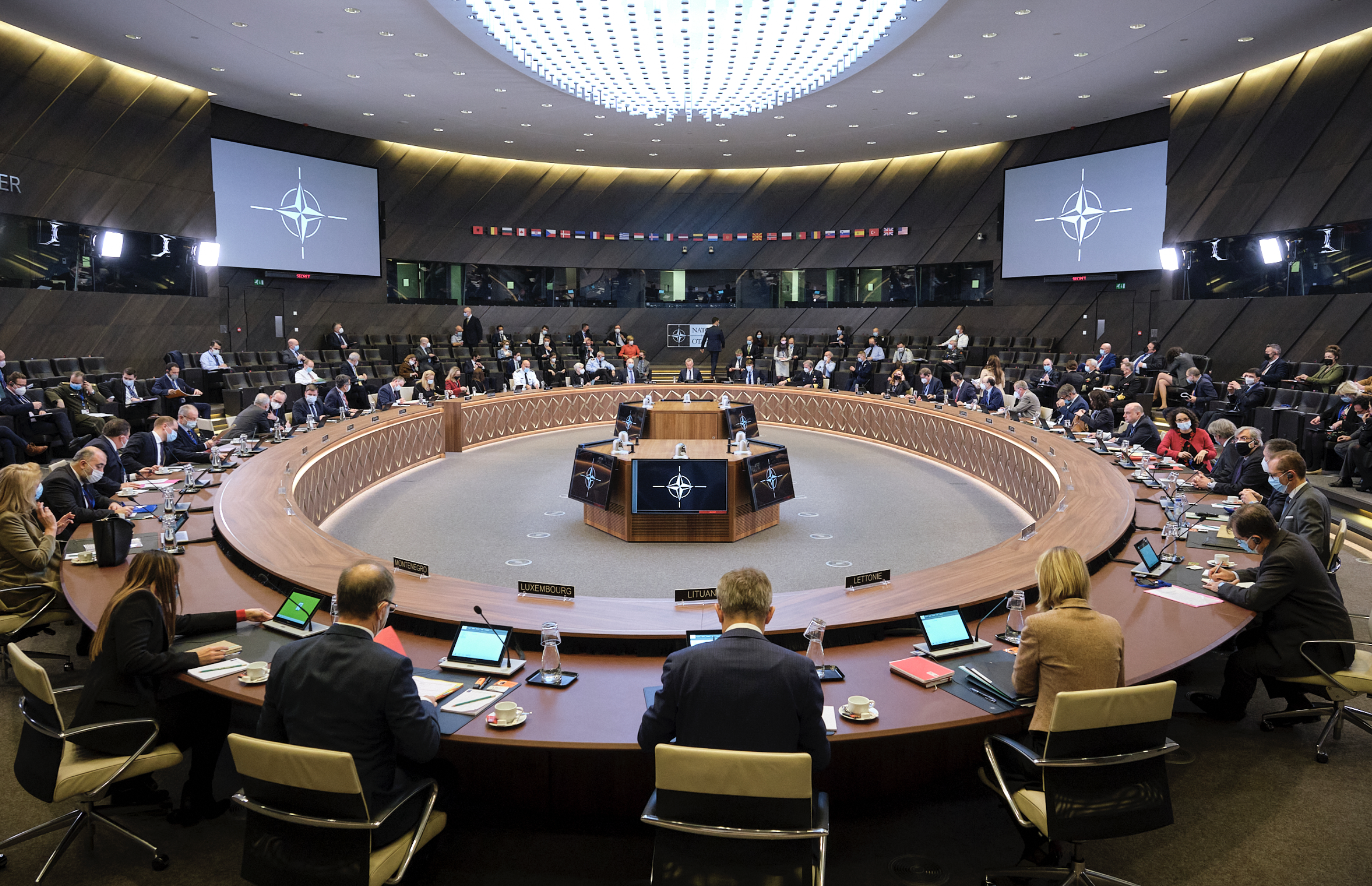
NATO's North Atlantic Council convenes to discuss the crisis, 11 January 2022

NATO became a flash point during the crisis, with one of the Russian government's main demands being that NATO stop admitting new members, particularly Georgia and Ukraine. Russia also strongly opposed Finland and Sweden's potential accession to NATO, both of which had publicly declared interest in joining after Russian threats of further invading Ukraine.

As of 2023, Ukraine is not a NATO member but has affirmed its goal of eventually joining NATO. Ukraine participates in NATO's Partnership for Peace program, including the annual Exercise Sea Breeze and Rapid Trident NATO military exercises. NATO has repeatedly called upon Russia to respect Ukraine's sovereignty and territorial integrity and condemned Russia's annexation of Crimea in 2014. In response to the conflict with Russian-backed separatists in eastern Donbas, NATO called for the resolution of the conflict via the Minsk agreements. In December 2021, as Russia continued a military buildup on Ukraine's borders, the NATO Parliamentary Assembly met with Ukrainian leaders. In the meeting, NATO representatives reaffirmed the alliance's support for Ukraine, called upon NATO members to increase the delivery of defensive weapon systems to Ukraine, and supported efforts to counter Russian disinformation. NATO indicated it would not defend Ukraine if Russia attacked it.

Talks in January 2022 between the U.S. and Russia were at an impasse over Russia's demand that Ukraine be barred from joining NATO, with the lead Russian negotiator, Deputy Foreign Minister Sergei Ryabkov, saying that it was "absolutely mandatory" that Ukraine "never, never, ever" join NATO. By contrast NATO and the U.S. have affirmed NATO's "open door" policy, maintaining that countries should freely choose whether to join NATO or not. NATO Secretary General Jens Stoltenberg said that: "No one else has the right to try to veto or interfere in that process. And this is about fundamental principles for European security. It's about the right for every nation to choose their own path."

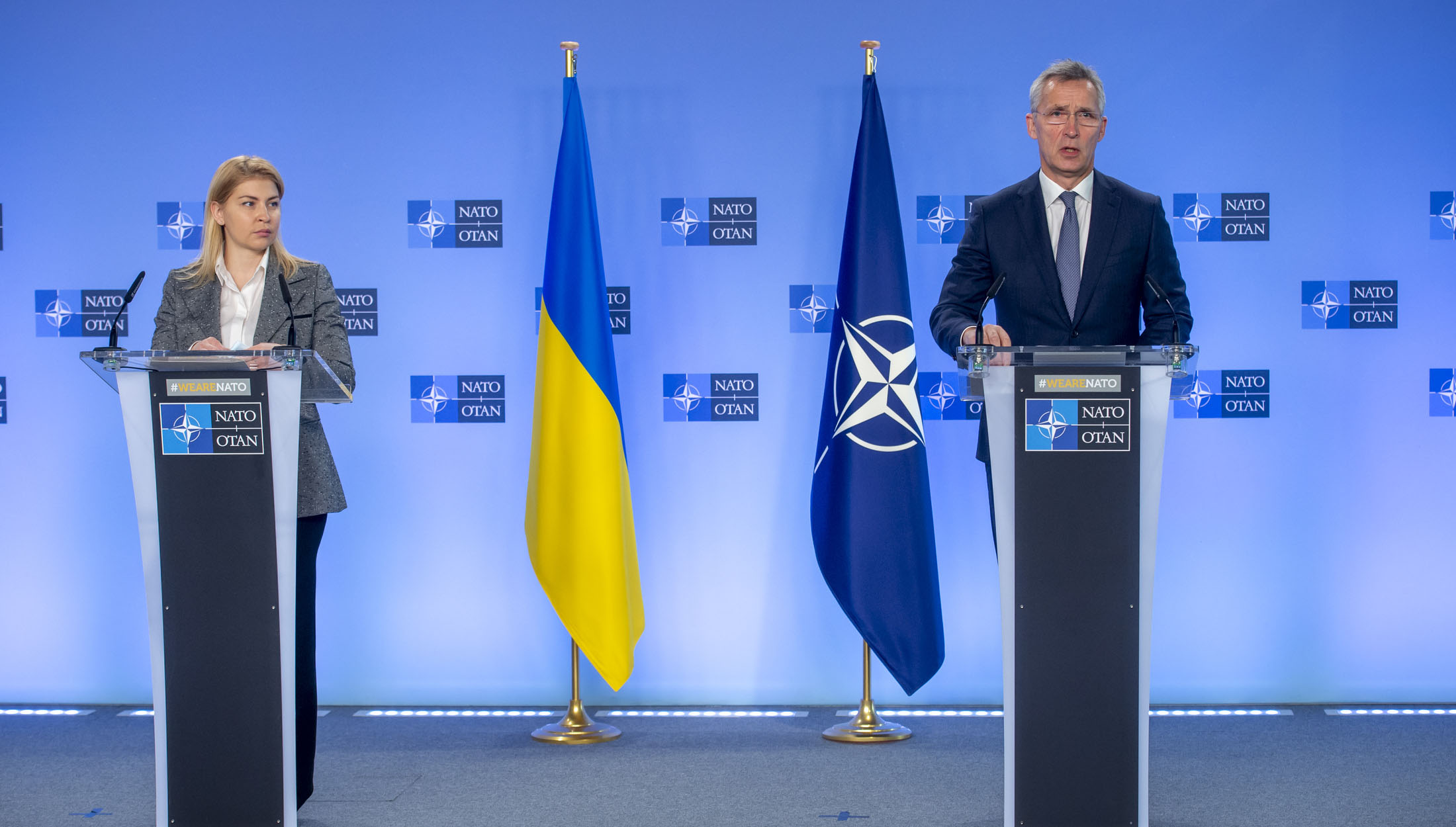
Deputy Prime Minister Olha Stefanishyna with NATO Secretary General Jens Stoltenberg at conference 10 January 2022 regarding a potential Russian invasion

During the crisis, Stoltenberg urged Russia to turn away from belligerency, participate in diplomatic talks, and cooperate with NATO. In a January 2021 interview, he reaffirmed NATO's "dual track" approach to Russia, saying, "We are ready to engage in dialogue with Russia, but we will never compromise on core principles for European security....Russia has a choice to either engage in dialogue with NATO and Western allies or choose confrontation. We need to be clear-eyed about the prospect that Russia will — once again — use military force against Ukraine. We will provide support to Ukraine to enable them to strengthen their ability to defend themselves."

Spanish Foreign Minister José Manuel Albares stated that Spain wanted "dialogue, but if does not bear fruit, of course, Spain will stand with its European partners and its NATO allies united in deterrence".

On 24 January, NATO announced it would send additional military forces to its Eastern members while putting its troops on standby. Discussing the actions in a press release, Stoltenberg declared "NATO will continue to take all necessary measures to protect and defend all Allies, including by reinforcing the eastern part of the Alliance. We will always respond to any deterioration of our security environment, including through strengthening our collective defence." Deployments included four Danish F-16 fighter jets being sent to Lithuania, in addition to a frigate travelling to the Baltic Sea. Two Dutch F-35 fighter jets will also be deployed to Bulgaria. The chief of staff of the Belgian army also stated that the country was ready to send more forces to NATO's eastern allies. Russia's deputy foreign minister, Alexander Grushko condemned the deployments, saying that the military alliance was "demonising Russia" in order to "justify military activity on [NATO's] eastern flank".

On 25 February, British troops arrived in Estonia as part of a NATO mission amidst the conflict.

== United Nations ==
After the invasion started on February 24, 2022 United Nations (U.N.) Secretary-General António Guterres stated that the Russian invasion was "the saddest moment in my tenure" and called on Putin to withdraw his troops "in the name of humanity".

On 25 February, the U.N Security Council failed to adopt a draft resolution which would have "deplored, in the strongest terms, the Russian Federation's aggression" on Ukraine, despite support from the majority of members. Of the 15 member states on the Security Council, 11 were in support, whilst 3 abstained from voting. The draft resolution was voted down through Russia's veto.

On 2 March 2022, the UN General Assembly voted to deplore "in the strongest possible terms" Russia's aggression against Ukraine by a vote of 141 to 5, with 35 abstentions. The resolution also calls for the Russian Federation to "immediately cease its use of force against Ukraine" and "immediately, completely and unconditionally withdraw all of its military forces." Only Russia, Belarus, Syria, North Korea and Eritrea voted against the resolution.

On 4 March, the UN Human Rights Council adopted a resolution by a vote of 32 to 2, with 13 abstentions, calling for the withdrawal of Russian troops and Russian-backed armed groups from Ukraine and humanitarian access to people in need. The resolution also establishes a commission to investigate alleged rights violations committed during Russia's military attack on Ukraine.

On 24 March, the UN General Assembly voted 140 to 5 in favor of a resolution approving aid access and civilian protection in Ukraine, and which again criticized Russia's invasion of Ukraine.

On 7 April, the UN General Assembly voted 93–24, with 58 abtensions, to suspend Russia from the UN Human Rights Council.

== Other countries' reactions ==
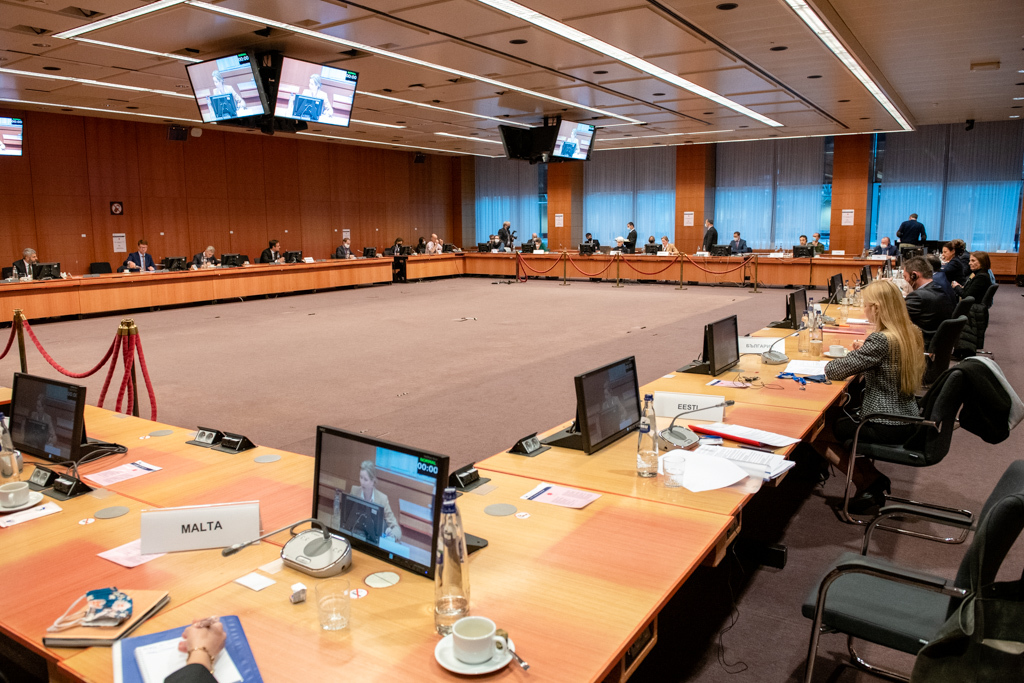
The European Union Political and Security Committee meets in January 2022 to discuss the crisis

=== Europe ===
On 13 January 2022, due to what it regarded as Russia's aggressive behaviour, Denmark sent four F-16 fighter jets and a frigate with a crew of 160 people to the Baltic states to reinforce the NATO Enhanced Forward Presence and patrol the sea. On January 24, Belgian Chief Head of Defense Michel Hofman stated that Belgian forces are on standby in the Baltic, and prepared "to intervene within a certain amount of time, but today it is too early to say where and how" should the situation escalate. On 19 January 2022, Croatia's prime minister Andrej Plenković told Sabor: "Croatia doesn't want escalation and will react clearly and decisively to avoid any kind of instabilities". On 25 January 2022, Croatia's president Zoran Milanović, who has no executive powers in the country's political system, noting what he called NATO's military build-up in the region and the Biden administration's "inconsistent and dangerous conduct" in international security affairs and stressing his role as Croatia's commander-in-chief, told the press, "We do not have any bearing on this and we will not have anything to do with this. I guarantee this. Croatia will not send any troops in case of an escalation. On the contrary, it will recall all troops, to the last Croatian soldier." Milanović went on to say that an "arrangement to meet Russia's security interests" ought to be found and that the acute crisis over Ukraine was "primarily determined by the dynamics of the U.S. domestic politics". On the same day, prime minister Andrej Plenković reacted to the president's remarks by saying that on hearing those he thought it was being said "by some Russian official"; he also offered apologies to Ukraine and its government for Milanović's accusation of Ukraine as "one of the most corrupt states" and reiterated that Croatia supported Ukraine's territorial integrity and no Croat troops were in Ukraine, while the president's statement "had nothing whatsoever to do with the policy of the government of the Republic of Croatia". The Minister of Foreign Affairs of Slovakia, Ivan Korčok, stated that the ceasefire and the announcement of an increase in Russia's military power on the border with Ukraine are a matter of concern and call for de-escalation of tensions.

Albanian Armed Forces Colonel Ardian Lulaj and Kosovar Head of Strategic Communication Colonel Sefer Isufi both stated in early December 2021 that their respective countries would be willing to deploy Albanian Armed Forces and Kosovo Security Forces in a putative future mission in Ukraine should the US decide to lead such an endeavor.

In early January, Bulgarian Minister of Defense Stefan Yanev responded to a parliamentary question on the deployment of additional military units in Bulgarian territory that Bulgaria opposes "escalation of military measures before all other diplomatic means are used" and that Bulgaria had as of yet "no national position" on the situation. In December, Yanev's perceived dismissal and "snub" to the idea of increased NATO troops had caused agreement and some condemnation within parliament. On January 20, Bulgaria began receiving new deployments of aircraft, ships and NATO forces from Spain. As of January 21, Bulgaria's prior stance that it was not interested in any immediate new submarine purchases was reported to have "shifted", with the Bulgarian government now in negotiations to purchase two new submarines, with Yanev remarking that "the Bulgarian army must retain readiness... to react to the development of a negative scenario in relation to Ukraine and Russia", while continuing to reiterate his earlier calls for de-escalation. The same day, Bulgarian Prime Minister Kiril Petkov condemned the Russian call for Bulgaria to leave NATO and for NATO troops to be withdrawn from Bulgaria and Romania, while President Roumen Radev called the statement "unacceptable".

Also on 21 January 2022, during an interview, President of Moldova Maia Sandu declared that the Moldovan authorities were looking closely into the tensions in Ukraine and that certain preemptive measures were being adopted to prepare for possible outcomes of the crisis. Sandu also demanded the withdrawal of the Russian troops in Transnistria, a breakaway territory legally and internationally considered as part of Moldova.

On 23 January 2022, Pope Francis said, "I am following with concern the rising tensions that threaten to inflict a new blow to peace in Ukraine, and call into question the security of the European continent, with even wider repercussions".

On 24 January 2022, due to the conflict, the European Commission proposed €1.2 billion financial aid for Ukraine in grants and loans. Due to Russian naval exercises 240 km off Ireland's south-west coast, Ireland's foreign minister Simon Coveney said that Russia is not welcome. On the same day, commenting on the departure of family members of U.S. Government employees at the U.S. Embassy in Kyiv, EU foreign policy chief Josep Borrell said there is no need "to dramatize as far as the negotiations are going on."

On 2 February 2022, President of Romania Klaus Iohannis asked the Romanian Armed Forces to be prepared for any aggression in the region and said that the tensions in Ukraine showed that measures of modernization and preparation of the Romanian military were necessary. Furthermore, Iohannis called for a greater presence of NATO, the United States and other allies in the region of the Black Sea as a result of the crisis between Russia and Ukraine. Previously, the Minister of National Defence of Romania Vasile Dîncu had said that Romania would not military involve itself in the event of a new Russian–Ukrainian war.

==== Baltic states ====
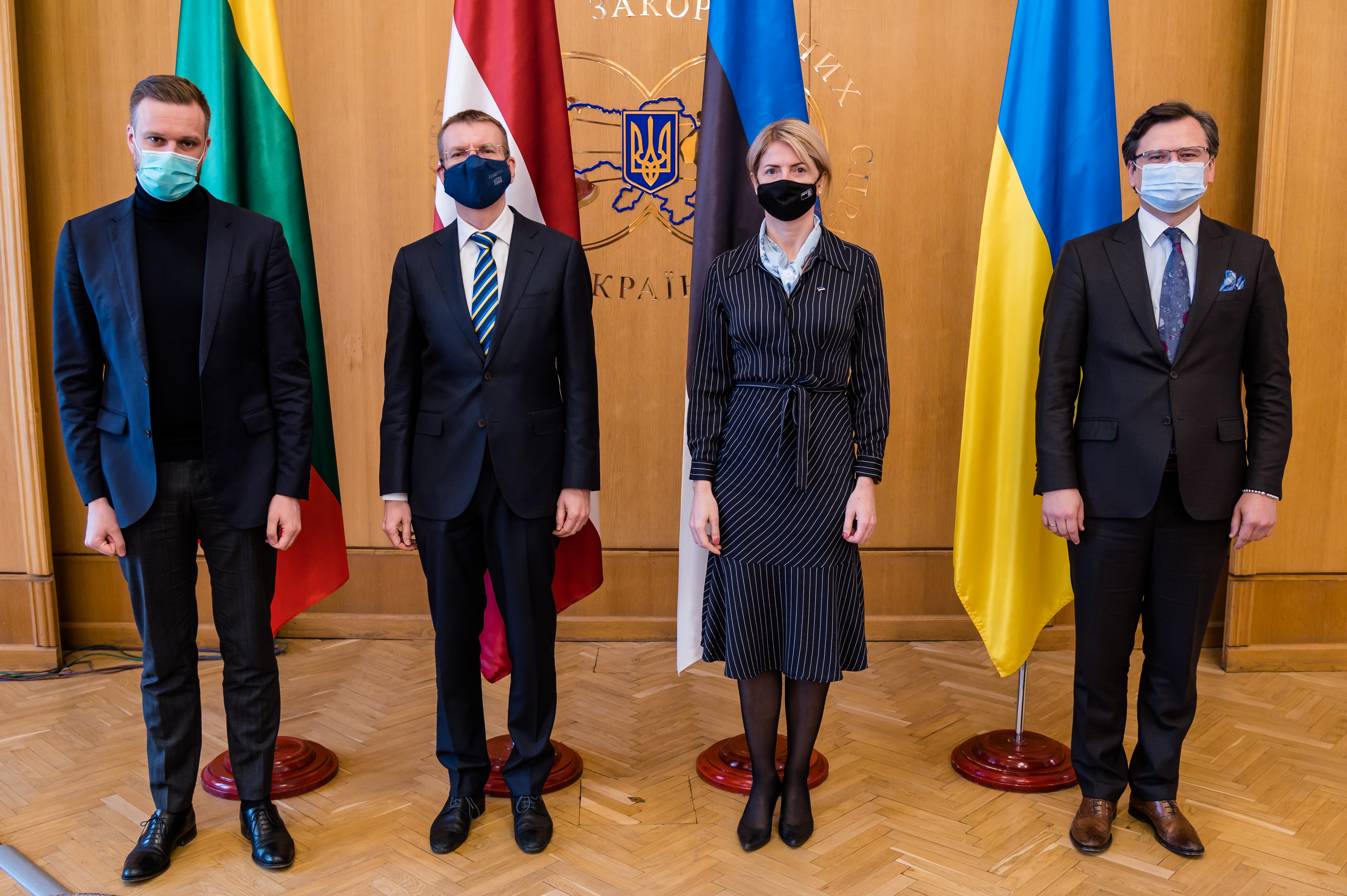
Estonian, Latvian and Lithuanian Foreign Ministers' visit to Ukraine on 15 April 2021

On 10 January 2022, Lithuanian State Defense Council was convened to discuss the Russian-Ukrainian tensions. In response to the aggressive Russian military behaviour, the council decided to increase the number of troops and speed up military modernization plans. On January 17, Latvia increased the military presence in the eastern part of the country. On 19 January, Kaja Kallas, the Prime Minister of Estonia, announced an extraordinary increase of defense spending by €380 million for the current fiscal year. The Baltic states also decided to accelerate their own acquisition of arms, including the joint rocket artillery system.

Estonia, Latvia and Lithuania have also requested to increase the military deployments of NATO and American troops in the Baltics in order to deter the aggressive Russian behaviour.

==== Finland and Sweden ====
Russian proposals that NATO would not accept new members received strong criticism by Sweden and Finland who have been maintaining neutrality. In January 2022, both President of Finland Sauli Niinistö and Prime Minister Sanna Marin insisted on Finland's right to decide what alliances it can join. Sweden expressed the same position that it is only up to the Swedish people to decide whether Sweden should join NATO. Russian threats have sparked the debate in both countries whether they should apply for NATO membership.

On 13 January, Swedish Armed Forces announced that they were deploying troops to the strategic island of Gotland, as a response to unusual Russian military activity.

==== France ====
The Minister for Foreign Affairs of Ukraine Dmytro Kuleba had a telephone conversation with the Minister for Foreign Affairs of France Jean-Yves Le Drian. Dmytro Kuleba informed his interlocutor in detail about the latest actions of the Russian Federation aimed at destabilizing the security situation in the temporarily occupied territories of Ukraine. The Minister drew attention to the threatening withdrawal of Russian troops to the border of our state and the intensification of Russian propaganda that threatens Ukraine with war. He assured that Ukraine does not seek war and remains committed to a political and diplomatic settlement of the Russo-Ukrainian war. Jean-Yves Le Drian noted that France, like Ukraine, is anxiously monitoring the withdrawal of Russian troops to the borders of our country and the temporarily occupied territories. He assured of France's continued support for Ukraine's sovereignty and territorial integrity. The head of French diplomacy especially noted Ukraine's prudent and wise actions in the current situation.

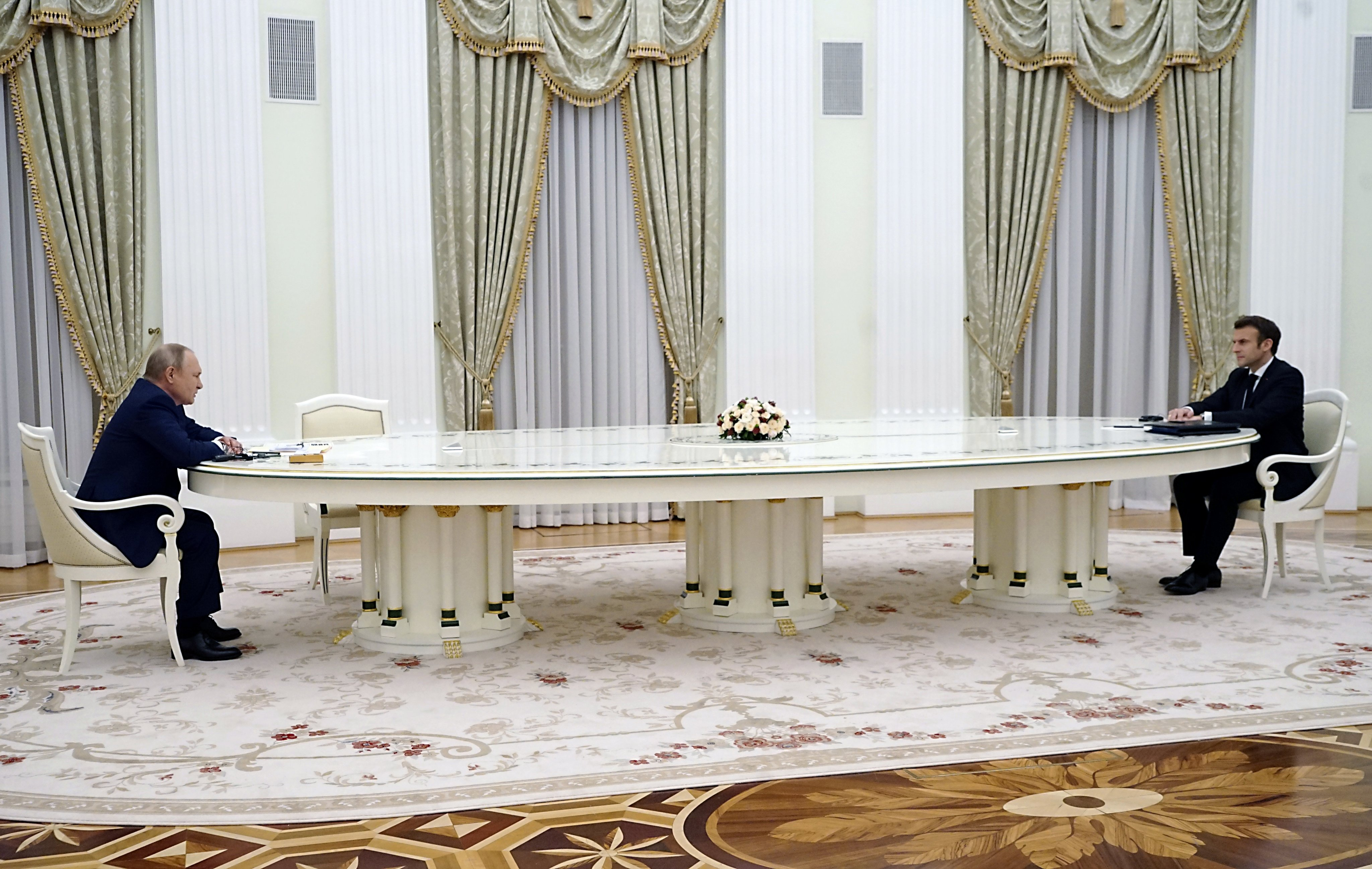
Russian President Vladimir Putin and French President Emmanuel Macron in Moscow on 7 February 2022

==== Germany ====
In April 2021, During a telephone conversation with Russian President Vladimir Putin, German Chancellor Angela Merkel demanded that the Kremlin head reduce its military presence near Ukraine's borders.

In December 2021, German chancellor Olaf Scholz warned of "consequences" for the Nord Stream 2 pipeline, a Russian natural gas pipeline project operated by Gazprom, Russia's state-owned energy company, which delivers natural gas to Germany. In January 2022, German Foreign Minister Annalena Baerbock warned that "any further escalation would carry a high price for the Russian regime — economic, political and strategic".

Germany has been maintaining the policy of not providing Ukraine with lethal weapons. German Defence Minister Christine Lambrecht said that Germany wants to "de-escalate" tensions and that supplying weapons would "not be helpful". Ukraine also claimed that the German administration blocks the supply of arms though NATO. On 21 January 2022, it was reported that Germany blocked Estonia from exporting weapons of German-origin.

German policy has been criticized by Ukrainians as well as domestically. Following pressure and criticism that Germany was not supplying weapons to Ukraine, Germany agreed to send 5,000 helmets.

According to a Forsa survey, 43% of respondents in former East Germany hold the United States responsible for the escalation of the Russo-Ukrainian crisis, and only 32% said it was Russia's fault. In the West, 52% said Russia was to blame.

==== Poland ====
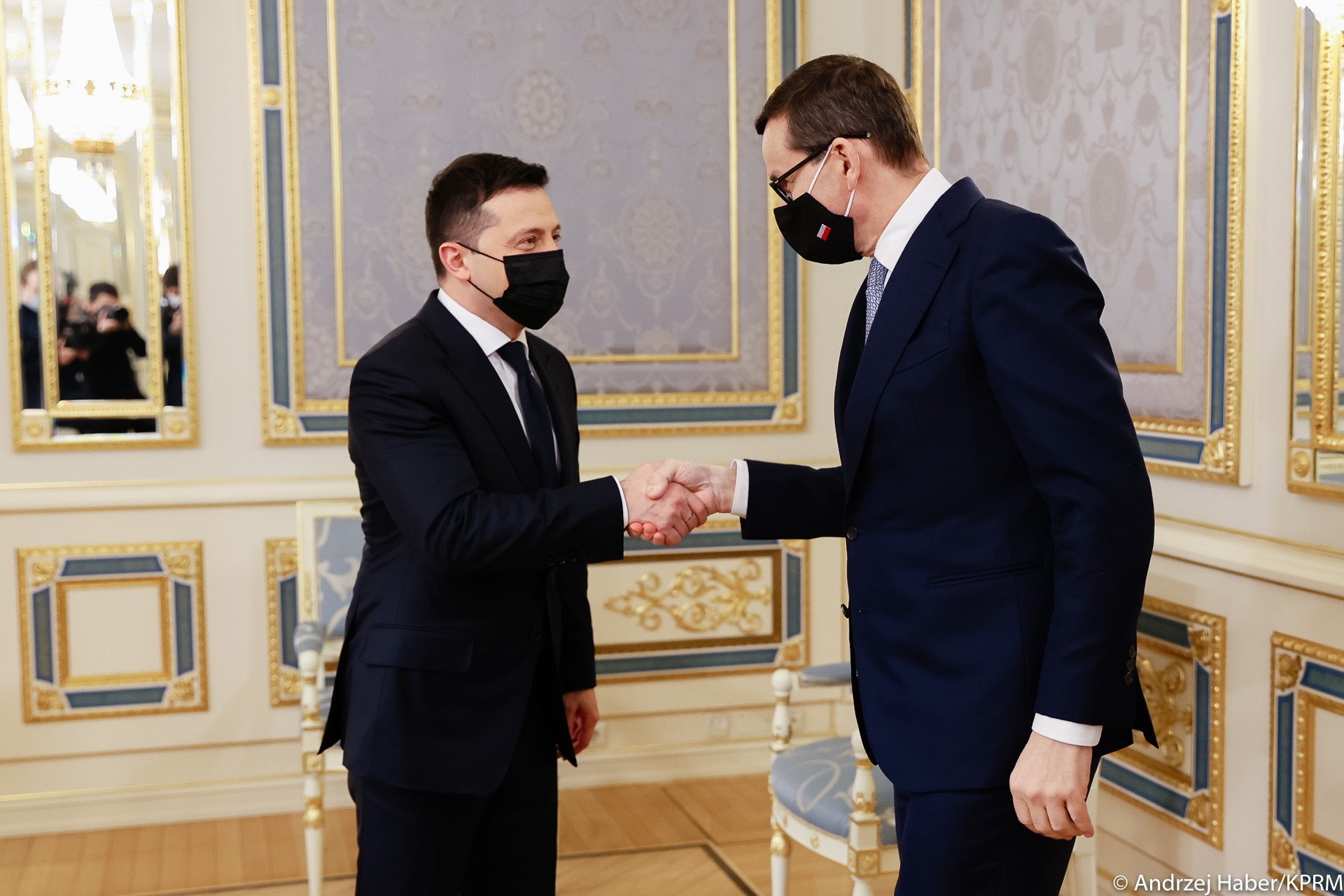
Zelenskyy with Polish Prime Minister Mateusz Morawiecki in Kyiv on 1 February 2022

On 21 January 2022, Polish President Andrzej Duda announced that Ukraine can count on Polish support if Russia attacks, and called for a unified stance in Europe. As of 24 January, Pawel Soloch, the head of Poland's National Security Bureau stated there was no talk of Polish troops entering Ukraine as the Ukrainian government had not requested it, but that "what matters most is military and humanitarian aid" and "building a uniform message". On the 21st, Soloch stated that "supporting Ukraine is one of the key priorities of President Andrzej Duda's policy", while Duda and Zelenskyy discussed the possibility of further Polish and NATO defensive equipment deliveries.

On February 1, the United Kingdom, Poland, and Ukraine began talks to form a "trilateral pact" to counter potential threats from Russia to tighten cooperation "on various fields". Polish Prime Minister Mateusz Morawiecki pledged help from Warsaw for Ukraine in terms of both gas, humanitarian and economic aid, and arms, including artillery ammunation, mortars, portable air-defense systems, and surveillance drones, saying that "living close to a neighbour like Russia we have the feeling of living at the foot of a volcano". He also called on Germany not to start the Nord Stream 2 pipeline because "through launching this pipeline, Berlin is loading Putin's pistol, which he can then use to blackmail the whole of Europe", and that it was important not just for Ukraine but for all of Europe and NATO to stand up to Russia.

On February 3, it was announced that Polish President Andrzej Duda, the only elected EU head of state attending the Beijing Winter Olympics ceremony, would use the visit to present the "European case" to Beijing regarding its view on the conflict.

On February 26, the president of the Polish Football Association (PZPN) Cezary Kulesza announced that Poland will not play their World Cup qualifier match against Russia on March 24. On February 27, in a statement published on its website, PZPN has demanded Russia's exclusion from this year's World Cup in Qatar.

==== United Kingdom ====
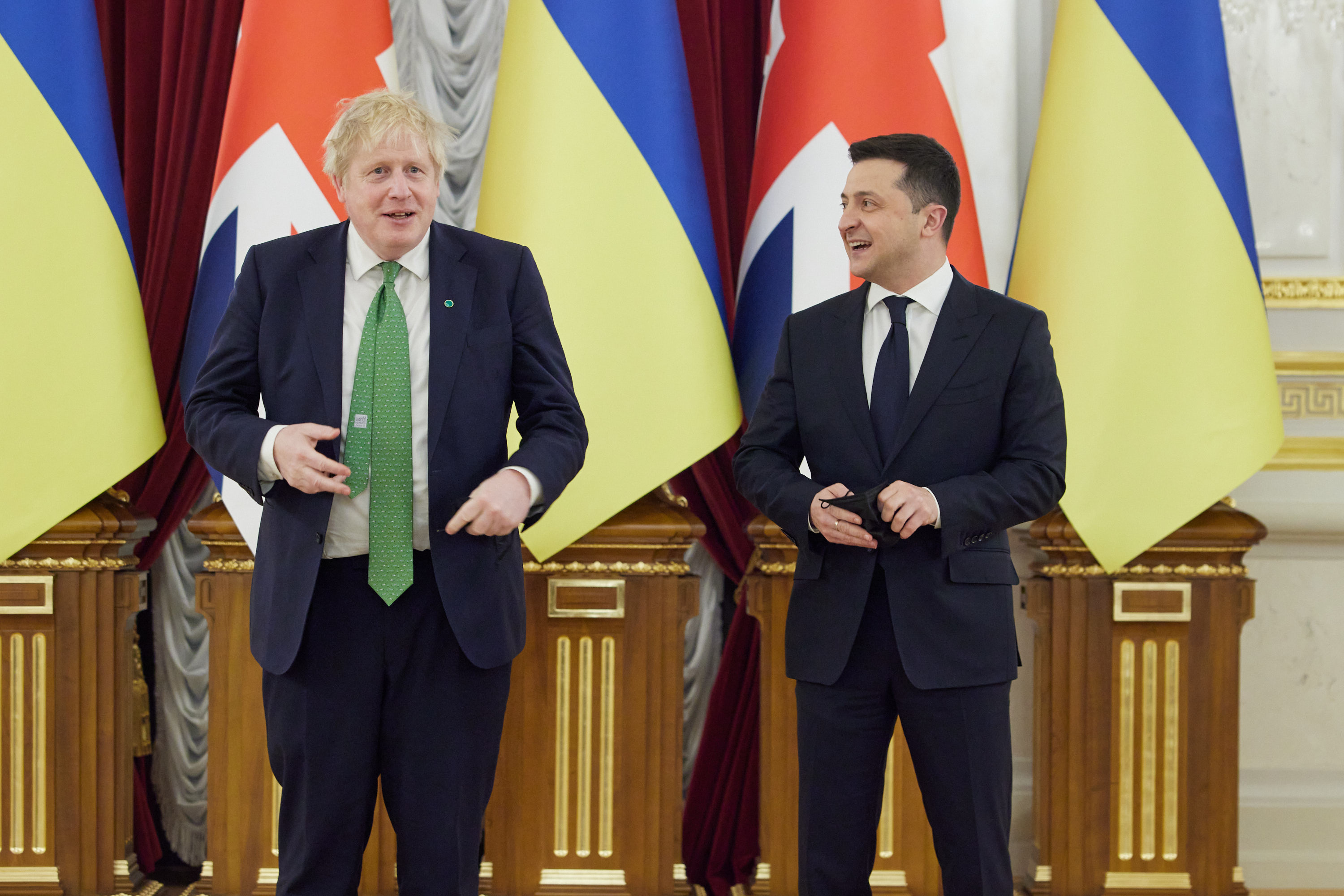
Ukrainian President Zelenskyy and British Prime Minister Boris Johnson in Kyiv on 1 February 2022

The Prime Minister of the United Kingdom, Boris Johnson, said that his country was concerned about Russia's activities in the occupied Crimea and on the border with Ukraine. He said this during a telephone conversation with President of Ukraine Volodymyr Zelenskyy. Johnson launched a warning to Russian mothers, saying that their sons were not likely to return home if President Putin chose to invade Ukraine. Deputy Prime Minister Dominic Raab has said that "there is a very significant risk Russia will invade Ukraine" and urged Putin to "step back from the brink". Foreign Secretary Liz Truss wrote on Twitter that the UK "will not tolerate Kremlin plot to install pro-Russian leadership in Ukraine."

Admiral Sir Tony Radakin, the Chief of the Defence Staff, warned that "a full invasion of Ukraine would be on a scale not seen in Europe since World War Two."

The Labour leader Keir Starmer said Russia should be hit with "widespread and hard-hitting sanctions".

On February 1, the United Kingdom, Poland, and Ukraine began talks to form a "trilateral pact" to counter potential threats from Russia to tighten cooperation "on various fields".

On 7 February 2022, Johnson said Britain would not "flinch" as he prepared to deploy Royal Marines, RAF aircraft, and Royal Navy warships to eastern Europe.

On 10 February 2022, British Foreign Secretary Liz Truss met with her Russian counterpart Sergey Lavrov. Lavrov described the discussion as "turning out like the conversation of a mute and a deaf person". He dismissed "demands to remove Russian troops from Russian territory" as "regrettable" and asked Truss if she recognized Russia's sovereignty over the Voronezh and Rostov regions, two Russian provinces where Russian troops are deployed. She mistakenly thought Lavrov was referring to areas of Ukraine and replied that "the U.K. will never recognize Russian sovereignty over these regions." Later that day, the Foreign Office prepared legislation to allow for more sanctions on Russian organisations and individuals.

Defence Secretary Ben Wallace said that a Russian invasion of Ukraine was "highly likely", and British citizens were being told by the Foreign Office to evacuate while commercial means were still available.

The Duke and Duchess of Cambridge tweeted that "Today we stand with the President and all of Ukraine's people as they bravely fight for that future".

=== North America ===
==== Canada ====
In January 2022, the Prime Minister of Canada, Justin Trudeau stated that Canada would provide Ukraine with a CDN$120 million loan, but will not transfer military equipment. The President of Ukraine Volodymyr Zelenskyy had a telephone conversation with the Prime Minister of Canada Justin Trudeau. The President informed Trudeau about the constant violations of the ceasefire in Donbas, leading to growing losses among the Ukrainian military, as well as the increasing military threat to Ukraine from Russia.

==== United States ====
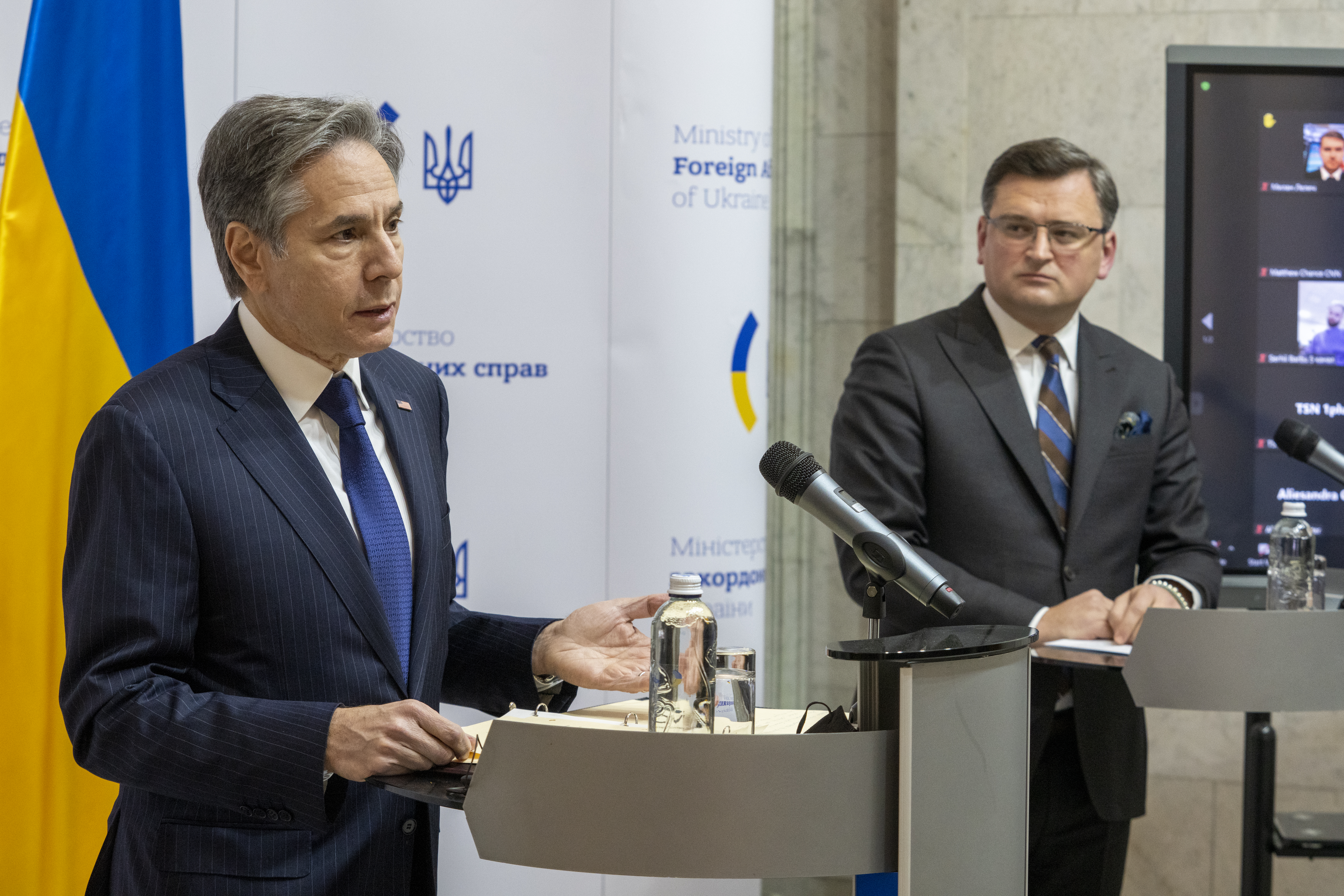
US Secretary of State Antony Blinken holds a joint press availability in Kyiv with Ukrainian Foreign Minister Dmytro Kuleba in January 2022

Ukrainian Foreign Minister Dmytro Kuleba and U.S. Secretary of State Antony Blinken discussed the aggravation of the situation in Donbas. Blinken reaffirmed U.S. unwavering support for Ukraine's sovereignty and territorial integrity.

In late March 2021, the U.S. Chairman of the Joint Chiefs of Staff Mark Milley spoke with the Commander-in-Chief of the Armed Forces of Ukraine Ruslan Khomchak to discuss the current security environment in Eastern Europe. On the same day, Milley had a conversation with the Chief of the General Staff of the Armed Forces of the Russian Federation Valery Gerasimov. Ukraine's then-defense minister Andriy Taran had a telephone conversation with U.S. defense secretary Lloyd Austin to discuss specific areas of strengthening cooperation in the field of security and defense. Lloyd Austin expressed concern over the recent actions of Russia and assured Taran of his readiness to support Ukraine in the context of Russia's ongoing aggression in the Donbas and Crimea. Austin stressed that in the event of an escalation of Russian aggression, the U.S. would not leave Ukraine alone.

On 2 April 2021, President Joe Biden had his first telephone conversation with Ukrainian President Volodymyr Zelenskyy. On 13 April, Biden had a telephone call with Russian president Putin; Biden "emphasized the United States' unwavering commitment to Ukraine's sovereignty and territorial integrity"; Biden also voiced U.S. concern "over the sudden Russian military build-up in occupied Crimea and on Ukraine's borders, and called on Russia to de-escalate tensions." Biden and Putin agreed to meet in a "third country" in the coming months to discuss the subject.

In mid-April 2021, the U.S. Department of the Treasury, along with the EU, UK, Australia, and Canada, sanctioned eight individuals and entities "associated with Russia's ongoing occupation and repression in Crimea."

The Chicago Council on Global Affairs poll, conducted on 7–26 July 2021, found that 50% of Americans supported the use U.S. troops to defend Ukraine if Russia invaded the rest of the country.

Senior officials of the Biden administration reported that Russia had only withdrawn a few thousand troops since the previous military buildup in early 2021. The New York Times estimated over 80,000 Russian troops still remain at the Russo-Ukrainian border by September 2021.

American intelligence officials warned that Russia was planning an upcoming major military offensive into Ukraine scheduled to take place in January 2022.

Adam Schiff, chairman of the House Intelligence Committee, said that it was "very likely" that Russia would invade Ukraine. According to Schiff, the occupation of Ukraine would see "more NATO assets closer to Russia. [It] will have the opposite impact of what Putin is trying to achieve". Senator Bob Menendez, chairman of the Senate Foreign Relations Committee, proposed the idea of severe sanctions "at the maximum end of the spectrum", and reiterated the possibility of cutting out Russia from the SWIFT international payment system.

On 19 January 2022, President Biden said that he believed Russia would invade Ukraine. Biden said a full-scale invasion of Ukraine would be "the most consequential thing that's happened in the world in terms of war and peace" since World War Two. In January 2022, the Biden administration approved deliveries of U.S.-made Stinger surface-to-air missiles to Ukraine.

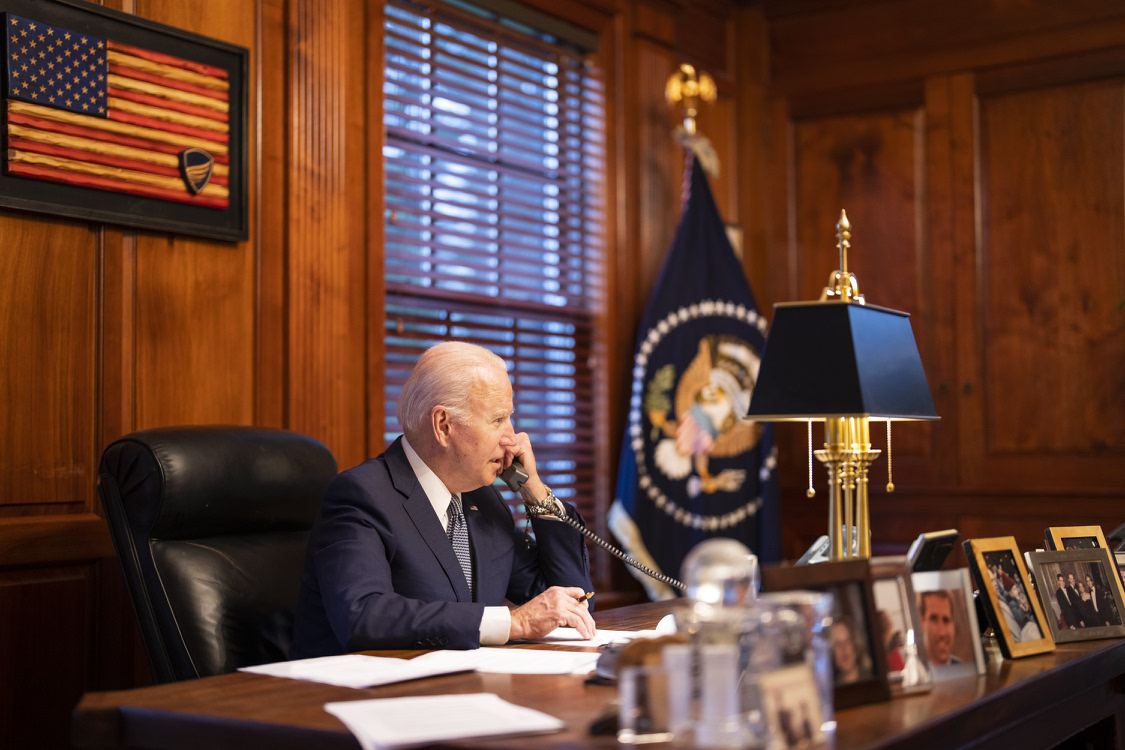
President Joe Biden speaks on the phone with President Vladimir Putin on 29 December 2021

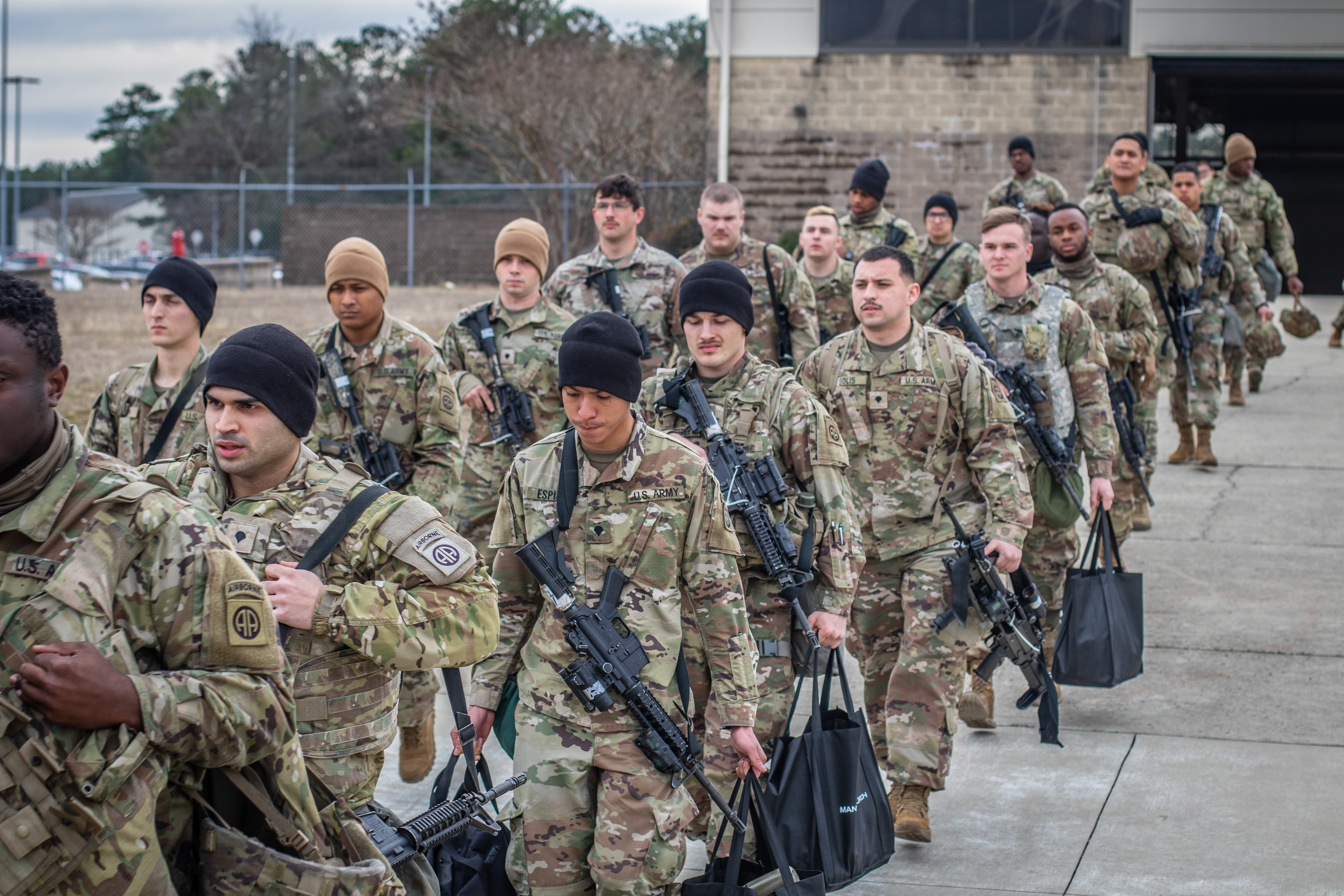
U.S. 82nd Airborne Division and XVIII Airborne Corps troops board a C-17 to deploy to Eastern Europe, 8 February 2022

U.S. officials began talks with Qatar and other natural gas exporters over supplying European countries with liquefied natural gas (LNG). The EU member states receive about 40% of its natural gas supply from Russia and possible US sanctions could heavily impact Russia's supplies to Europe during the winter season.

On 22 January 2022, the U.S. Embassy in Kyiv requested the evacuation of non-essential personnel along with their families by the United States Department of State. The State Department issued an advisory not to travel to Ukraine or Russia, citing ongoing tension along the Russia–Ukraine border and COVID-19. Ukrainian Foreign Ministry spokesman Oleh Nikolenko called the U.S. move as "premature" and a "display of excessive caution." The source close to President Zelenskyy characterized the U.S. move as "utterly ridiculous".

A Pentagon spokesman John Kirby on January 24 related that "Brigade combat teams, logistics personnel, medical support, aviation support intelligence, surveillance and reconnaissance as well as transportation..." military units within the United States have been alerted for potential use in Eastern Europe. President Joe Biden is considering deploying up to 50,000 U.S. troops to Eastern Europe.

The United States has threatened to halt the opening of the Nord Stream 2 pipeline that would send Russian natural gas to Germany, "if Russia invades Ukraine one way or another." White House National Security Council spokesperson Emily Horne said that "President Biden said that there is a distinct possibility that the Russians could invade Ukraine in February." Biden and Ukrainian President Zelenskyy disagreed on how imminent the threat was.

On 2 February 2022, The Pentagon has officially confirmed the deployment of additional US troops to strengthen NATO's eastern flank. The details of the operation were presented at the press conference by Pentagon spokesman John Kirby. 2,000 soldiers are to arrive on the Old Continent in the next few days. Of the US troops stationed in Germany, 1,000 soldiers will go to Romania, where they will support the 900-strong contingent already present in the country. Approx. 1,700 soldiers from the 18th Airborne Corps will go to Poland.

On 11 February 2022, Biden's national security advisor Jake Sullivan publicly warned about the likelihood of a Russian invasion of Ukraine prior to the end the 2022 Winter Olympics, urging all Americans to leave Ukraine immediately and indicating that there may be "no prospect of a U.S. military evacuation" once the invasion commences. Sullivan downplayed comparisons of intelligence warnings of a possibly imminent Russian invasion of Ukraine to the lead-up to the 2003 invasion of Iraq, which was based on claims that Iraq possessed weapons of mass destruction. Senior official of the Biden administration told reporters: "We are not basing our assessment of this on what the Russians say publicly. We are basing this assessment on what we're seeing on the ground with our own eyes, which is the continued Russian buildup on the border with Ukraine, and no meaningful evidence of de-escalation."

President Biden reportedly told Western leaders that Russia could invade Ukraine on 16 February 2022.

On 26 February 2022, actor Sean Penn, who was in Ukraine working on a documentary about the ongoing Russian assault, stating in an interview with USA Today that "If he doesn't relent, I believe Mr. Putin will have made a most horrible mistake for all of humankind."

On March 4, 2022, the US Embassy in Ukraine declared that striking a nuclear power station constituted a war crime after Russia took Ukraine's largest nuclear facility in Europe.

=== Latin America ===
==== Argentina ====
On February 24, the Ministry of Foreign Affairs of Argentina, rejected the use of force and called on Russia to respect the charter of the United Nations and international law. That same day, President Alberto Fernández lamented the invasion and asked "the Russian Federation to put an end to the military action, respect Ukraine's sovereignty and return to dialogue". On February 25, Argentina, along with Brazil and three other Latin American states abstained during a vote at the Organization of American States condemning the Russian invasion of Ukraine due to not considering the organization a "pertinent forum". On March 2, Argentina voted in favor of the United Nations General Assembly Resolution ES-11/1, condemning Russia's invasion of Ukraine and demanding a full withdrawal of Russian forces. Before the UN, Foreign Minister Santiago Cafiero condemned "the invasion of Ukraine as illegitimate and military operations on Ukrainian soil," and said that the world "does not tolerate more deaths or wars". Argentina has also condemned the Russian invasion at the UN Human Rights Council and is providing humanitarian assistance to Ukraine.

==== Brazil ====
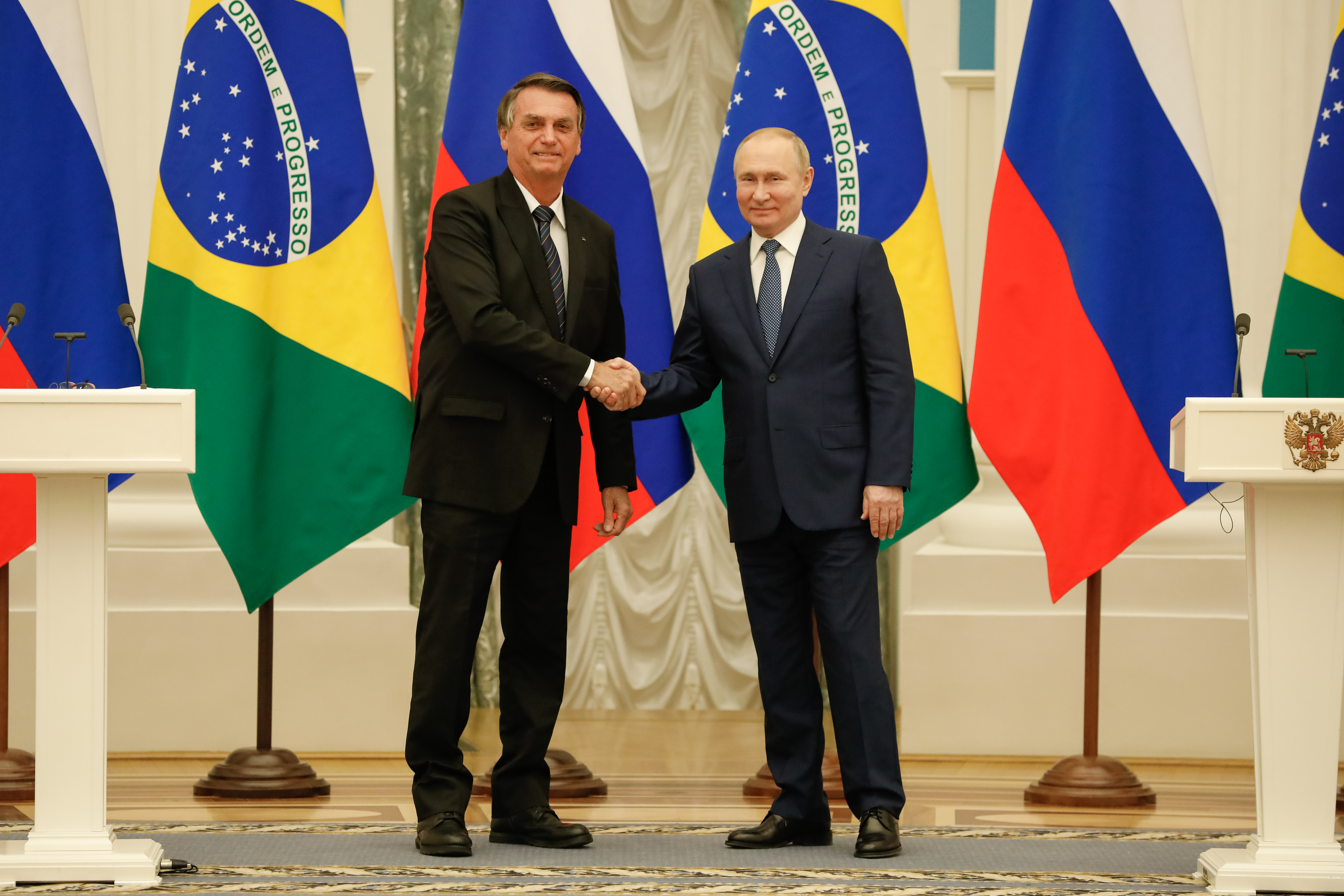
Putin and Brazilian President Jair Bolsonaro on 16 February 2022

Brazil's president Jair Bolsonaro arrived in Moscow for trade talks with Putin on 16 February 2022. Bolsonaro said: "We pray for peace and respect all who act in that way."

==== Chile ====
President Sebastián Piñera condemned the invasion of Ukraine by Russian troops. On 24 February 2022, Piñera called it an "act of aggression and violation of Ukraine's sovereignty and territorial integrity" and that Russian actions "violate international law". President-elect Gabriel Boric tweeted that Russia has "opted for war as a means of resolving conflicts" and condemned the violation of Ukraine's sovereignty and the illegitimate use of military force by Russia.

==== Colombia ====
On 13 February 2022, Colombia's President Ivan Duque instructed its Chancellery to contact all Colombians registered as residing in Ukraine to offer them repatriation assistance. Duque has rejected any attempt to use force to limit any country from deciding whether or not to join NATO. On 15 February 2022, Ivan Duque stated that Colombia will accompany the international community imposing sanctions in case of military aggression against Ukraine.

==== Uruguay ====
On 23 February 2022, the Ministry of Foreign Relations issued a statement condemning the use of force and urging all parties involved to take the necessary measures to reduce tensions and achieve a political agreement. The Uruguayan government expressed "concern" about the situation with the recognition of the separatist republics of Donetsk and Luhansk as sovereign states by Russia and the displacement of military troops, in violation of the principles of the Charter of the United Nations. In addition, it expressed that the country considers that the United Nations Security Council Resolution 2202 "provides the way for the application of the Minsk agreements, leading to a peaceful and lasting solution to the conflict", and that the solution should "respect the sovereignty, independence and territorial integrity" of Ukraine.

==== Venezuela ====
Venezuelan President Nicolás Maduro expressed his full support for Vladimir Putin during a Russian diplomatic delegation visit in the Miraflores presidential palace, ratifying the way for military cooperation. Maduro further expressed "all his support" after Putin's recognition of the Donetsk and Luhansk and the Russian mobilization into the territories. Juan Guaidó, on the other hand, described the action as an "illegal recognition" and "unilateral action of intervention", and rejected the deployment of troops in the territories.

=== Asia ===
==== China ====
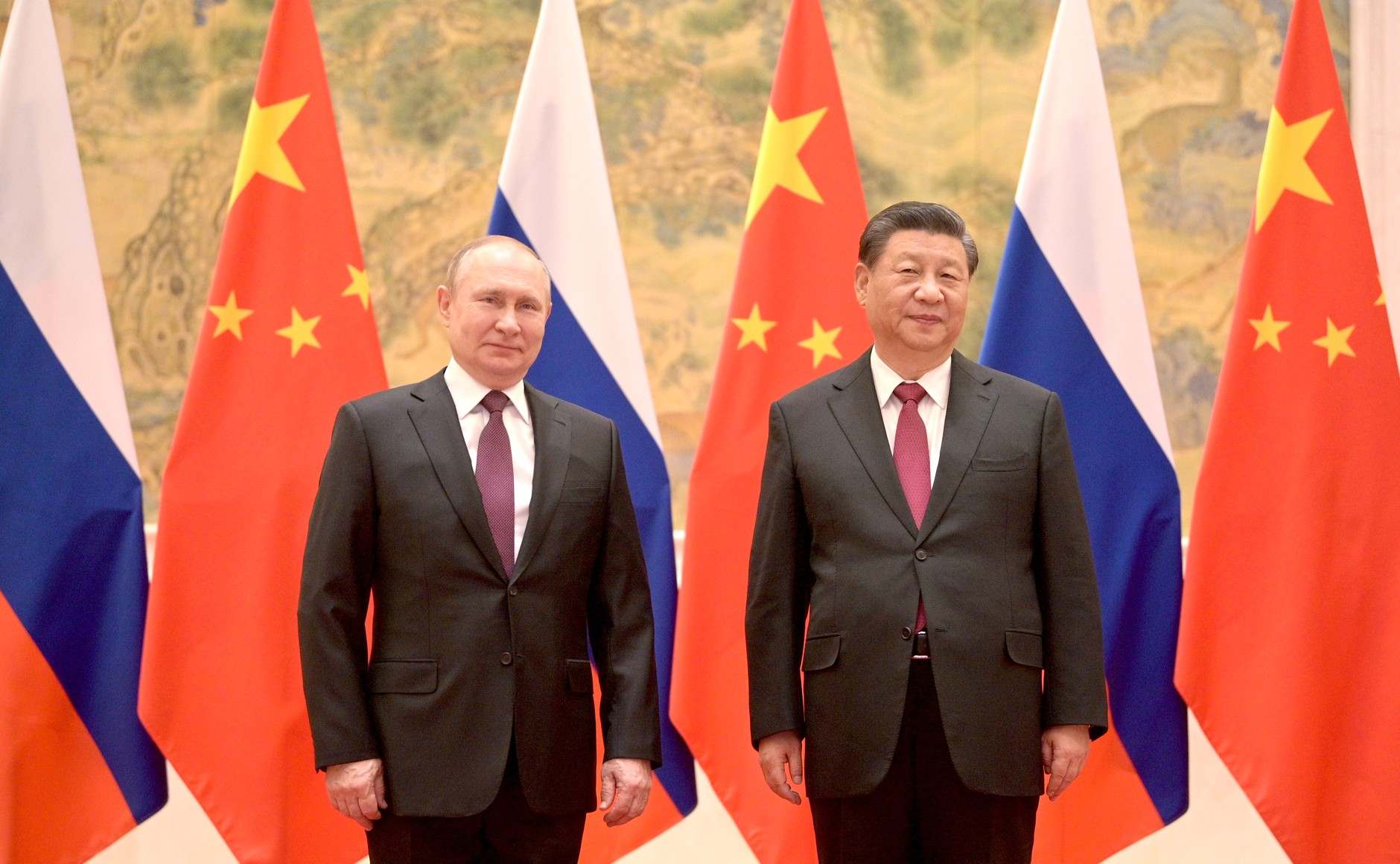
Putin visited China and met with Chinese leader Xi Jinping on 4 February 2022

The paramount leader of the People's Republic of China (PRC) and General Secretary of the Chinese Communist Party Xi Jinping supported Russia's demand that Ukraine should not join NATO. On 14 January 2022, a spokesman of PRC's Foreign Ministry emphasized that all countries should observe a traditional UN Olympic Truce resolution "from seven days before the start of the Olympic Games until seven days after the end of the Paralympic Games", referring to both the upcoming 2022 Beijing Winter Olympic Games taking place from 4 February 2022 to 20 February 2022 as well as the upcoming 2022 Beijing Winter Paralympic Games taking place from 4 March 2022 to 13 March 2022. Under this timeframe, the proposed truce resolution would thusly begin on 28 January 2022 and conclude on 20 March 2022. Such a truce was not honored by Putin.

==== Indonesia ====
The Ministry of Foreign Affairs tweets the condemnation in their official Twitter account, "Adherence to the purposes and principles of the UN Charter and International Law, including respect for territorial integrity and sovereignty, must continuously be upheld. Therefore, the military attack on Ukraine is unacceptable. Moreover, the attack puts the people's lives in grave danger and threatens regional as well as global peace and stability. Indonesia calls for this situation to be put to an end and further calls on all parties to cease hostilities and put forward peaceful resolution through diplomacy. Indonesia urges the UN Security Council to take concrete steps to prevent the situation from further deteriorating. The Indonesian government, through the Ministry of Foreign Affairs, has prepared evacuation plans for Indonesian citizens in Ukraine. The safety of the Indonesian people is always the priority of the government."

==== Israel ====
Israeli Prime Minister Naftali Bennett offered to mediate and broker a ceasefire between Russia and Ukraine, owing to Israel's close diplomatic ties with both countries. Russia rejected this offer.

Israel has sent a 100-ton humanitarian aid shipment to Ukraine. The aid includes 17 tons of medical equipment and medicine, water purification systems intended to supply hundreds of thousands of people with clean water, emergency water supply kits to supply 100,000 people with water, and winter protective gear.

Israel announced that it will be opening a field hospital in Ukraine. The hospital, which will be operated by Israel's Sheba Medical Center, will include an emergency room, a delivery room, wards for children and adults, and a primary healthcare clinic.

Israel has turned down Ukrainian requests to send military equipment to Ukraine.

==== Japan ====
Prime Minister of Japan Kishida Fumio said he and Biden would work closely to prevent a Russian invasion of Ukraine and "keep close contact with other allies and partners and continue communicating on the point that any attack will be met with strong action. "In a tweet, Biden said it was "an honor to meet with Prime Minister Kishida to further strengthen the U.S.-Japan Alliance — the cornerstone of peace and security in the Indo-Pacific and around the world."

==== Malaysia ====
Prime Minister Ismail Sabri, via a statement released by the Prime Minister's Office, had stated that it is concerned over the "escalation of conflict in Ukraine". It also calls for dialogue and promoting "peace and security". Independent news portal Malaysiakini noted that the statement released by the Prime Minister lacked forceful language and did not mention Russia nor characterised the conflict as an "invasion", prompting a response by the Press Secretary of the Prime Minister, who accused the news portal of diverting from "the gist of the press statement". On 27 February, the Malaysian Foreign Ministry denied a report by the South China Morning Post that it had "bungled" the evacuation of Malaysian nationals from Ukraine by forcing them to travel to Poland with their private vehicles in order to escape the Russian invasion after reports that the chartered bus scheduled to pick them up failed to arrive. This is followed by allegations that the Malaysian government had dismissed the possibility of a Russian invasion as a "Western narrative".

The Malaysian Parliament's Select Committee for International Affairs had described the situation as a "brutal invasion" by Russia, and had condemned Russia for invading Ukraine. It had also seeks to invite the Ministry of Foreign Affairs during its next session for a briefing on Malaysia's stance on the issue. It had also pledged to make a courtesy call to the Ukrainian Ambassador to Malaysia to express the committee's 'deepest concern' surrounding the invasion.

The Leader of the Opposition of the Dewan Rakyat, Anwar Ibrahim, had called for "end of the attacks" by Russia before more loss of lives occurred.

==== Singapore ====
Singapore's Ministry of Foreign Affairs stated that "Ukraine's sovereignty, territorial integrity 'must be respected'" and that "All parties concerned should continue to pursue dialogue, including diplomatic means, towards a peaceful settlement of the dispute, in accordance with international law, and avoid action that will further raise tensions in the region.

==== South Korea ====
President of South Korea Moon Jae-in said he expects peace and stability in Ukraine to be restored through diplomatic solutions.

==== Taiwan ====
A spokesperson of the Taiwanese Ministry of Foreign Affairs stated that the stance of the Taiwanese government solemnly condemns Russia's encroachment on Ukraine's sovereignty, and considers that the ongoing escalating tension between Ukraine and Russia is a unilateral change of the status quo by Russia. The Ministry of Foreign Affairs called on all involving parties to resolve disputes rationally through peaceful means and maintain peace and stability in the region, and respect the independence and territorial integrity of Ukraine.

==== Vietnam ====
The spokesperson for the Vietnamese Ministry of Foreign Affairs, Le Thi Thu Hang, stated Vietnam "calls on parties concerned in the Ukraine crisis to exercise self-restraint, enhance dialogue efforts and step up diplomatic measures to peacefully settle differences with respect for the United Nations Charter and fundamental principles of international law, thus contributing to ensuring peace, security, and stability in the region and the world."

=== Oceania ===
==== Australia ====
On 24 January, the Australian Minister for Foreign Affairs Marise Payne offered assistance to Ukraine in combating Russian cyber attacks. She also called on Russia to "de-escalate" tensions and urged Australians living in Ukraine to evacuate. The Australian Embassy also evacuated the families of diplomats stationed in Kyiv. Similar sentiments were expressed by Minister for Finance Simon Birmingham, who warned that Australia would tighten existing financial sanctions against Russia in the event of hostilities. Between 2014 and 2015, Canberra had imposed sanctions on allies of Vladimir Putin who had supported the Russian annexation of the disputed territory of Crimea.

On 24 February 2022, Prime Minister Scott Morrison released a statement condemning the actions of Russia, placing financial sanctions on Russia and preventing Australian investment in specific financial institutions. Morrison states: "We call on Russia to cease its illegal and unprovoked actions, and to stop violating Ukraine's independence".

==== New Zealand ====
New Zealand Minister of Foreign Affairs Nanaia Mahuta stated that the New Zealand Government was concerned about the Russian military buildup on the Ukrainian border and supported Ukraine's sovereignty and territorial integrity; urging Moscow to reduce tensions in accordance with international law. Prime Minister Jacinda Ardern reiterated New Zealand's support for Ukrainian sovereignty, adding that New Zealand was considering applying targeted sanctions against Russia.

=== Africa ===
==== Kenya ====
On 22 February 2022, Kenya's Permanent Representative to the United Nations, Mbugua Martin Kimani, delivered a speech to the UN Security Council, in which he criticised Russia's recognition of the Donetsk People's Republic and the Luhansk People's Republic, and drew comparisons between the borders of Europe and those of Africa, saying:

"This situation echoes our history. Kenya and almost every African country was birthed by the ending of empire. Our borders were not of our own drawing...Today, across the border of every single African country, live our countrymen with whom we share deep bonds."

His speech went viral on social media.

==== South Africa ====
The South African government released a statement on 24 February 2022 calling for Russia to "immediately withdraw its forces from Ukraine in line with the United Nations Charter" and called for the countries to settle its disputes by "peaceful means." International Relations and Cooperation Minister Naledi Pandor was reportedly disciplined by President Ramaphosa for making the statement in an effort to repair relations with Russia.

== Civil society ==
=== Anonymous hacker group ===
The decentralised Anonymous hacker group had dedicated some of their defacements of websites such as those of belonging to the United Nations and the Polar Research Institute of China, to promote proposals in order to defuse the crisis, including by calling for the creation of a "neutral grouping" of countries "wedged between NATO and Russia" that would include Ukraine, Finland, Belarus, Georgia, Armenia, Azerbaijan, and Moldova. Anonymous argued that the so-called "neutral security belt" could serve as an alliance similar to the North Atlantic Treaty Organization (NATO) or the Collective Security Treaty Organization (CSTO) that acts as a cordon sanitaire between NATO and CSTO countries in order to "assuage Russia's fears without NATO losing its face".

Furthermore, they embedded Quincy Institute for Responsible Statecraft senior fellow Anatol Lieven's paper "Ending the Threat of War in Ukraine" at the defacement page and called for a referendum on whether to presumably follow the existing Minsk Protocol or hand over the separatist-controlled territories to a UN peacekeeping administration. Later, a second referendum in the separatist regions would then ask voters to choose to reunite with Ukraine, gain independence, or join Russia.

In addition to that, they announced the launch of "Operation Samantha Smith" or #OpSamanthaSmith, a reference to the 1980s child peace activist. The operation was presumably dedicated into resolving this crisis. They threatened to take hostage of industrial control systems if the tensions continues to worsen and in an apparent warning meant for Russia, Anonymous wrote that the "sole party to be blamed if we escalate on that, will be the same one who started it in the very first place with troop buildups, childish threats, and waves of unreasonable ultimatums." The hacking collective also urged the United Nations to immediately deploy peacekeepers on "at least the Ukrainian side of the frontline in Donbass" under the basis of UN Resolution 337 (V) to "prevent any further provocations" by any side.

=== Belarusian opposition ===
On 24 January, Belarusian opposition hacktivists stated that they had disrupted Belarusian Railway "servers, databases and workstations" using ransomware, while leaving automation and security systems in place. They promised to decrypt the systems provided that 50 political prisoners were released and that Russian soldiers were prevented from entering Belarus.

Dmytro Bondarenko, coordinator of the European Belarus civil campaign, told Charter 97 on 26 January 2022, that he believed that in the event of Russian aggression, tens of thousands of Belarusians would fight against the Russian Federation on Ukraine's side and defend their country's independence. He interpreted Russian actions as the desire of Putin and Russian generals to threaten Ukraine and other countries as a result of "weakness".

=== Metropolis of Bessarabia ===
Representants of the Romanian Orthodox Metropolis of Bessarabia in Moldova declared that this institution was closely looking at the situation at Ukraine's borders. The metropolis also issued a statement asking for peace in the region and saying that it was praying for this to be the case.

=== Ukrainian civil society ===
On 5 February 2021, from two to five thousand people in Kharkiv marched through the city with banners stating "Kharkiv is Ukraine" and "stop Russian aggression". Participants stated that there was anger at the prospect of a Russian invasion, rather than panic as in 2014 when the war in Donbas started. Interviewees judged that the Ukrainian army and citizens would make a Russian invasion difficult, with the Russian forces "suffer[ing] intolerable losses", and that Kharkhiv residents "[knew] how to survive" after year of living under the threat of invasion.

On 12 February, two thousand people took part in a Unity March in the centre of Kyiv, with the aim of showing unity in opposition to the threat of a further Russian invasion of Ukraine. The protestors chanted Glory to Ukraine and carried Ukrainian flags. Banners declared "war is not the answer" and called for people to resist the possible invasion. March participants stated that they were ready to "fight for independence", were "not afraid", were "proud of their country", and asked, "Why should Putin be telling us what to do?" The march included veterans of the ongoing Russo-Ukrainian War.

== See also ==
- International recognition of the Donetsk People's Republic and the Luhansk People's Republic
- International reactions to the 2022 Russian invasion of Ukraine
