= History of NATO =

History of the North Atlantic Treaty Organization

Map of NATO enlargement (1952–present)

The history of the North Atlantic Treaty Organization (NATO) begins in the immediate aftermath of World War II. In 1947, the United Kingdom and France signed the Treaty of Dunkirk and the United States set out the Truman Doctrine, the former to defend against a potential German attack and the latter to counter Soviet expansion. The Treaty of Dunkirk was expanded in 1948 with the Treaty of Brussels to add the three Benelux countries (Belgium, the Netherlands, and Luxembourg) and committed them to collective defense against an armed attack for fifty years. The Truman Doctrine expanded in the same year, with support being pledged to oppose the communist rebellions in Greece and Czechoslovakia, as well as Soviet demands from Turkey. In 1949, the NATO defensive pact was signed by twelve countries on both sides of the North Atlantic – the five Brussels signatories, the United States, Canada, Italy, Portugal, Norway, Denmark, and Iceland. Greece and Turkey joined in 1952, West Germany joined in 1955, Spain joined in 1982, Czech Republic, Hungary and Poland joined in 1999, Bulgaria, Estonia, Latvia, Lithuania, Romania, Slovakia, and Slovenia joined in 2004, Albania and Croatia joined in 2009, Montenegro joined in 2017, North Macedonia joined in 2020, Finland joined in 2023, and Sweden joined in 2024.

The structure of NATO evolved throughout the Cold War and its aftermath. The first headquarters were located at 13, Belgrave Square, London (1948-51), before moving to a more suitable space in Paris in April 1952. The NATO Military Command Structure was established in 1950, enhancing its defences for the longer term against potential Soviet attack. In April 1951, Allied Command Europe and its headquarters (Supreme Headquarters Allied Powers Europe) were established; later, four subordinate headquarters were added in Northern and Central Europe, the Southern Region, and the Mediterranean.

From the 1950s to 2003, the Strategic Commanders were the Supreme Allied Commander Europe (SACEUR) and the Supreme Allied Commander Atlantic (SACLANT).

== Background ==
NATO has its roots in the Atlantic Charter, a 1941 agreement between the United States and United Kingdom. The Charter laid out a framework for international cooperation without territorial expansion after World War II.

The Treaty of Brussels was a mutual defense treaty against the Soviet threat at the start of the Cold War. It was signed on 17 March 1948 by Belgium, the Netherlands, Luxembourg, France, and the United Kingdom and was the precursor to NATO. The Soviet threat became immediate with the Berlin Blockade in 1948, leading to the creation of a multinational defense organization, the Western Union Defence Organisation, in September 1948. However, the parties were too weak militarily to counter the Soviet Armed Forces. In addition, the communist 1948 Czechoslovak coup d'état had overthrown a democratic government, and British foreign minister Ernest Bevin reiterated that the best way to prevent another Czechoslovakia was to evolve a joint Western military strategy. He got a receptive hearing in the United States, especially with the American anxiety over Italy and the Italian Communist Party.

== 1949–1991: Cold War ==
=== 1949–1962: Beginnings ===
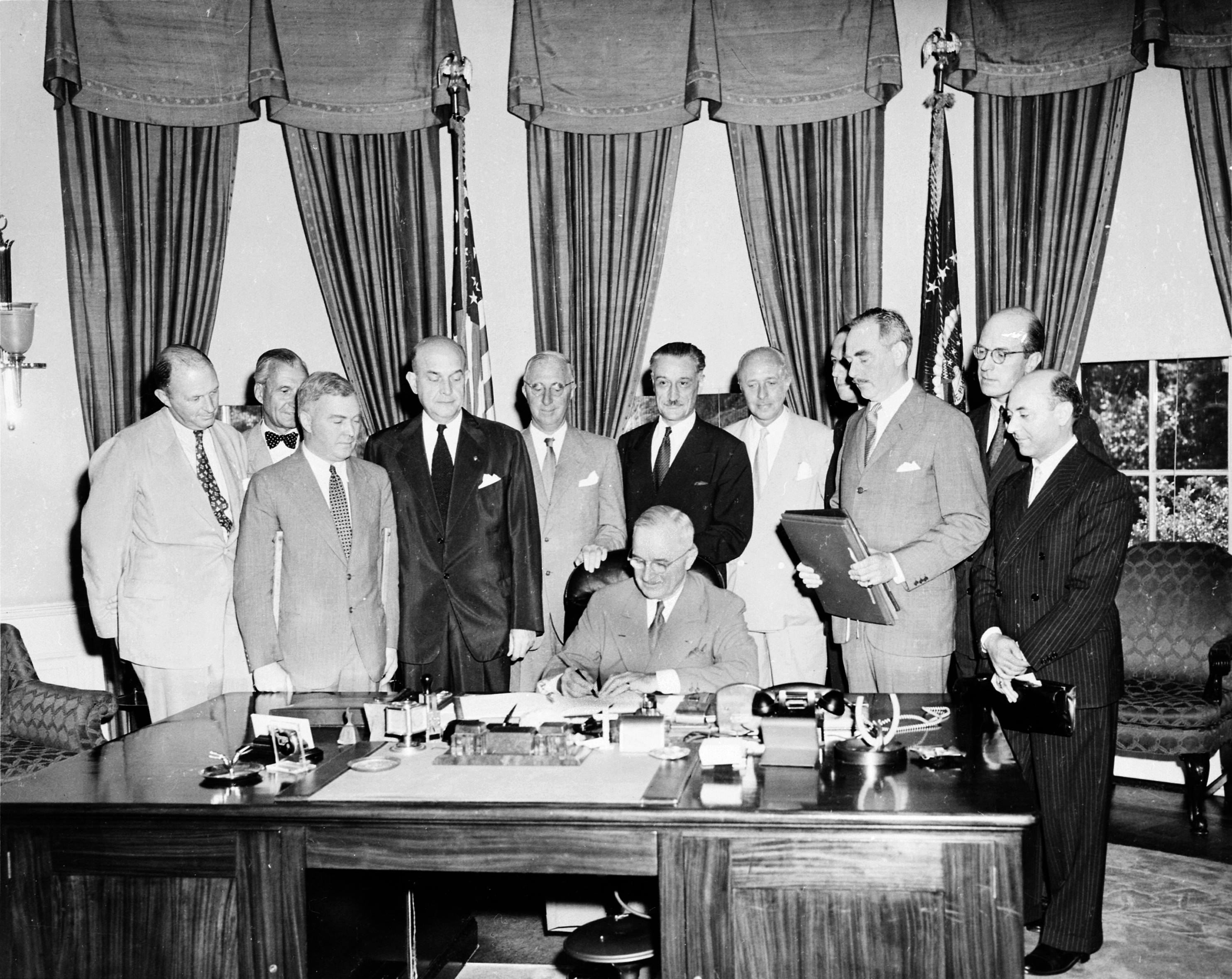
The North Atlantic Treaty was signed on behalf of the United States by US Secretary of State Dean Acheson in Washington, DC, on 4 April 1949, and ratified by the United States Senate July 21, 1949. President Harry S. Truman signed implementing legislation on August 24, 1949 (shown here).

In 1948, European leaders met with US defense, military, and diplomatic officials at the Pentagon, exploring a framework for a new and unprecedented association. The talks resulted in the North Atlantic Treaty, and the United States signed on 4 April 1949. Participants included the five Treaty of Brussels states, as well as the United States, Canada, Portugal, Italy, Norway, Denmark and Iceland. The first NATO Secretary General, Lord Ismay, stated in 1949 that the organization's goal was "to keep the Russians out, the Americans in, and the Germans down". Popular support for the treaty was not unanimous, and some Icelanders participated in a pro-neutrality, anti-membership riot in March 1949. The formation of NATO can be seen as the primary institutional consequence of a school of thought called Atlanticism, which stressed the importance of trans-Atlantic cooperation.

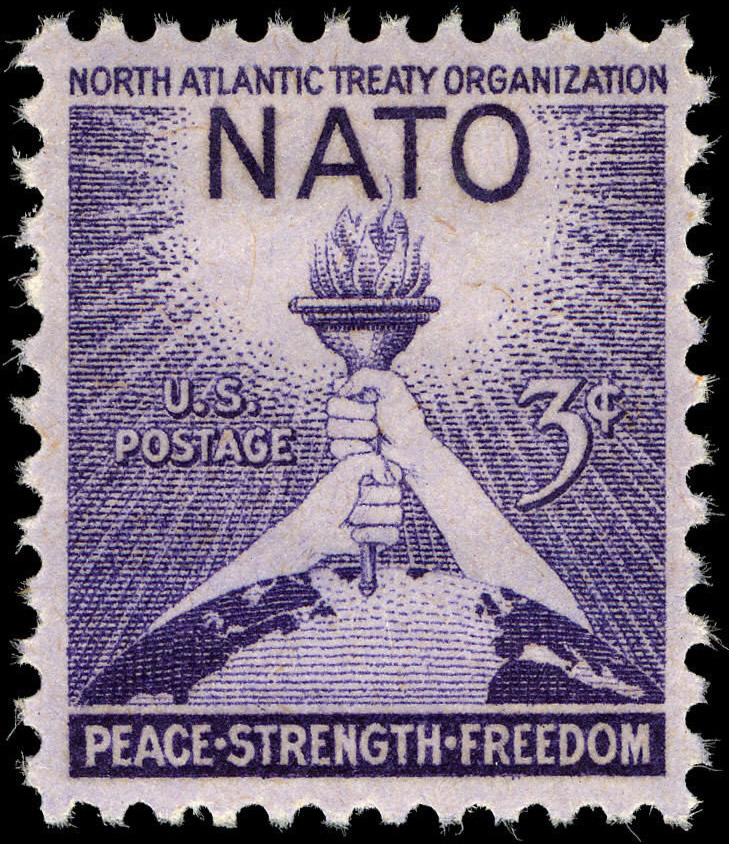
A 1952 US postage stamp commemorating the third anniversary of NATO. Several member countries have issued stamps honoring the organization.

The members agreed that an armed attack against any of them in Europe or North America would be considered an attack against them all. Consequently, they agreed that if an armed attack occurred, each of them, in the exercise of the right of individual or collective self-defense, would assist the member being attacked and take such action as it deemed necessary, including the use of armed force, to restore and maintain the security of the North Atlantic area. The treaty does not require members to respond with military action against an aggressor. Although obliged to respond, they maintain the freedom to choose the method by which they do so. That differs from Article IV of the Treaty of Brussels, which clearly states that the response is military in nature. NATO members are nonetheless assumed to aid the attacked member militarily. The treaty was later clarified to include both the members' territory and their "vessels, forces or aircraft" north of the Tropic of Cancer, including some overseas departments of France.

The creation of NATO brought about some standardization of allied military terminology, procedures, and technology, which, in many cases, meant European countries adopting US practices. Roughly 1300 Standardization Agreements (STANAG) codified many of the common practices that NATO has achieved. Thus many NATO countries introduced the 7.62×51mm NATO rifle cartridge in the 1950s as a standard firearm-cartridge. Fabrique Nationale de Herstal's FAL, which used the 7.62mm NATO cartridge, was adopted by 75 countries, including many outside NATO. Also, aircraft-marshaling signals were standardized so that any NATO aircraft could land at any NATO base. Other standards such as the NATO Stock Number became widespread, and the NATO phonetic alphabet extends beyond NATO into civilian use.

During the Cold War, most of Europe was divided between two alliances. Members of NATO are shown in blue, with members of the Warsaw Pact in red and unaffiliated countries are in grey. Yugoslavia, although communist, had left the Soviet sphere in 1948, and Albania was a Warsaw Pact member-only until 1968.

The outbreak of the Korean War in June 1950 proved crucial for NATO, as it raised the apparent threat of all Communist countries working together and forced the alliance to develop concrete military plans. NATO set up the Supreme Headquarters Allied Powers Europe (SHAPE) to direct forces in Europe; it began work under Supreme Allied Commander Dwight Eisenhower in January 1951. In September 1950, the NATO Military Committee called for an ambitious buildup of conventional forces to meet the Soviets and reaffirmed that position at the February 1952 meeting of the North Atlantic Council in Lisbon. The conference, seeking to provide the forces necessary for NATO's Long-Term Defence Plan, called for an expansion to 96 divisions. However, that requirement dropped the following year to roughly 35 divisions, with heavier use to be made of nuclear weapons. At this time, NATO could call on about 15 ready divisions in Central Europe and on another 10 in Italy and Scandinavia. Also at Lisbon, the post of Secretary General of NATO as the organization's chief civilian was created, and eventually the North Atlantic Council appointed Lord Ismay to the post.

In September 1952, the first major NATO maritime exercises began. Exercise Mainbrace brought together 200 ships and over 50,000 personnel to practice the defence of Denmark and Norway. Other major exercises that followed included: Exercise Grand Slam and Exercise Longstep, naval and amphibious exercises in the Mediterranean Sea; Italic Weld, a combined air-naval-ground exercise in northern Italy; Grand Repulse, involving the British Army on the Rhine (BAOR), the Netherlands Corps and Allied Air Forces Central Europe (AAFCE); Monte Carlo, a simulated atomic air-ground exercise involving the Central Army Group; and Weldfast, a combined amphibious landing exercise in the Mediterranean Sea involving American, British, Greek, Italian, and Turkish naval forces.

Greece and Turkey joined the alliance in 1952, which forced a series of controversial negotiations, mainly between United States and Britain, over how to bring both countries into the military command-structure. While that overt military preparation was going on, covert stay-behind arrangements initially made by the Western European Union to continue resistance after an expected Soviet invasion - including Operation Gladio - were transferred to NATO control. Ultimately, unofficial bonds began to grow between the respective armed forces of NATO member-states. Such links included the NATO Tiger Association (established in 1961) and competitions such as the Canadian Army Trophy for tank gunnery, instituted in 1963.

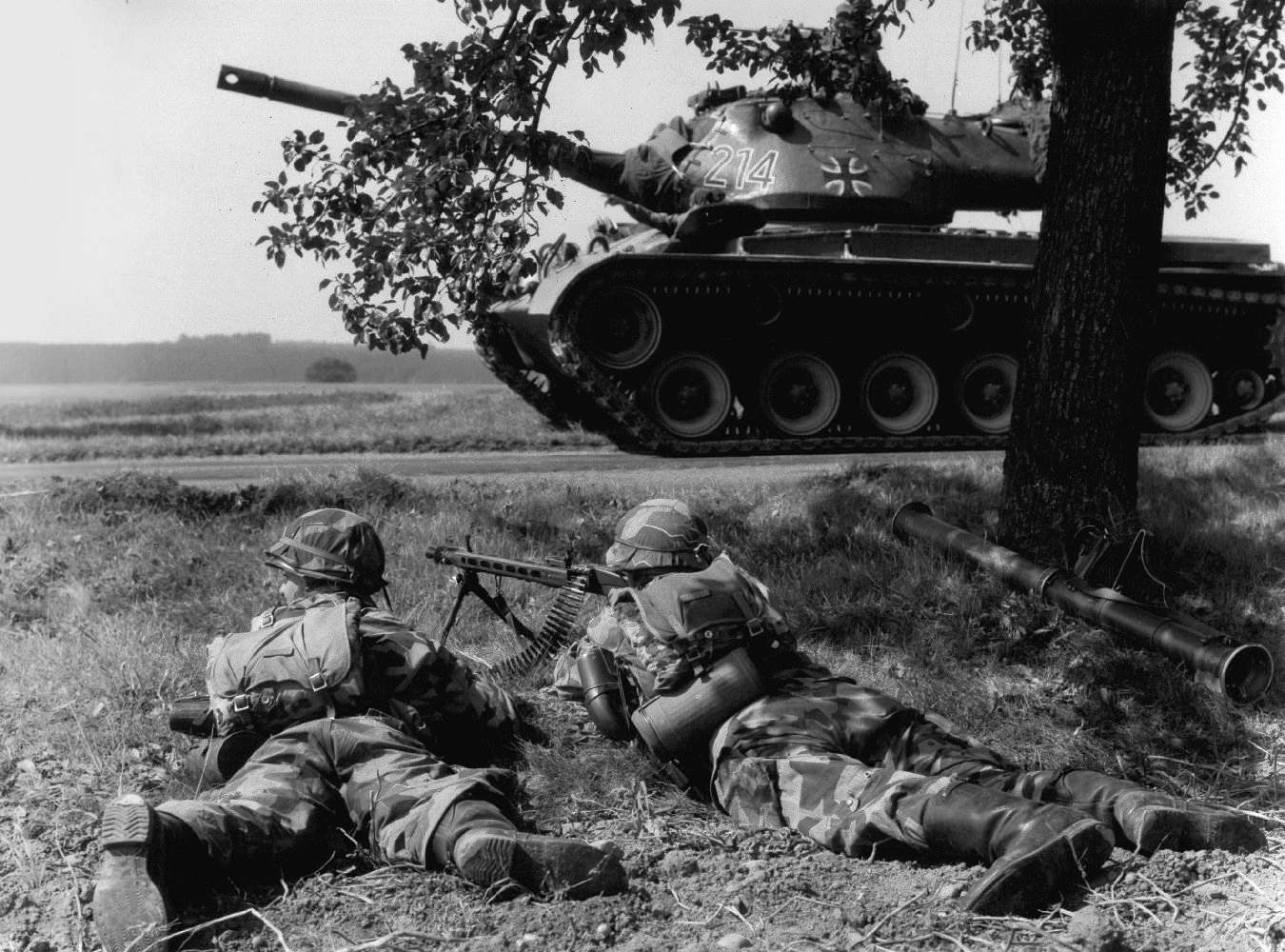
The German Bundeswehr provided the largest element of the allied land forces guarding the frontier in Central Europe.

In 1954, the Soviet Union suggested that it might join NATO to preserve peace in Europe. The NATO countries, fearing that the Soviet Union's motive was to weaken the alliance, ultimately rejected that proposal. On 17 December 1954, the North Atlantic Council approved MC 48, a key document in the evolution of NATO nuclear thought. MC 48 emphasized that NATO had to use atomic weapons from the outset of a war with the Soviet Union, whether or not the Soviets chose to use them first. That gave SACEUR the same prerogatives for automatic use of nuclear weapons that existed for the commander-in-chief of the US Strategic Air Command.

The incorporation of West Germany into the organization on 9 May 1955 was described as "a decisive turning point in the history of our continent" by Halvard Lange, then the Norwegian Foreign Affairs Minister. The alliance saw German manpower as necessary to have enough conventional forces to resist a Soviet invasion. One of the immediate results of West German entry was the creation of the Warsaw Pact, which was signed on 14 May 1955 by the Soviet Union, Hungary, Czechoslovakia, Poland, Bulgaria, Romania, Albania, and East Germany, thereby delineating the two opposing sides of the Cold War in Europe.

Three major NATO exercises took place concurrently in the northern autumn of 1957. Operation Counter Punch, Operation Strikeback, and Operation Deep Water were together the most ambitious military undertaking for the alliance so far, involving more than 250,000 men, 300 ships, and 1,500 aircraft operating from Norway to Turkey.

==== Strained relations with France ====
Map of the NATO air bases in France before Charles de Gaulle's 1966 withdrawal from NATO military integrated command

NATO's unity was breached early in its history with a crisis occurring during Charles de Gaulle's presidency (1959–1969) of France. De Gaulle protested the strong role of the United States in NATO and what he perceived as a special relationship between it and the United Kingdom. In a memorandum sent to US president Dwight Eisenhower and British prime minister Harold Macmillan on 17 September 1958, he argued for the creation of a tripartite directorate, which would put France on an equal footing with the US and the UK.

Considering the response to be unsatisfactory, de Gaulle began constructing an independent defense-force for his country. General de Gaulle doubted that the United States would enter into a full-fledged war with the USSR in case of an aggression of the Warsaw Pact against Western Europe, especially after the USSR had acquired a balistic capability to hit targets in the continental United States with megaton-weapons, and might be tempted to wage a "limited" nuclear war in Western Europe and prevent NATO European allies having nuclear weapons to hit targets in the USSR. In February 1959, France withdrew its Mediterranean Fleet from NATO command, and it later banned the stationing of foreign nuclear weapons on French soil. That caused the United States to transfer 300 military aircraft out of France and to return control of the air-force bases that it had operated in France since 1950 to France by 1967.

Though France showed solidarity with the rest of NATO during the Cuban Missile Crisis in 1962, de Gaulle continued his pursuit of an independent defense by removing France's Atlantic and English Channel fleets from NATO command. In 1966, all French armed forces were removed from NATO's integrated military command, and all non-French NATO troops were asked to leave France. A "seething" U.S. Secretary of State Dean Rusk asked for "clarification" from De Gaulle about whether American soldiers buried in French cemeteries, having fallen in part to defend and liberate France in two world wars, would also have to leave. The withdrawal forced the relocation of SHAPE from Rocquencourt, near Paris, to Casteau, Belgium, by 16 October 1967. France remained a member of the alliance and committed to the defense of Europe from possible Warsaw Pact attack, with its own forces stationed in West Germany throughout the Cold War. A series of secret accords between the US and French officials, the Lemnitzer–Ailleret Agreements, detailed how French forces would dovetail back into NATO's command structure if East-West hostilities broke out.

When de Gaulle announced his decision to withdraw from the integrated NATO command, US president Lyndon Johnson suggested that when de Gaulle "comes rushing down like a locomotive on the track, why the Germans and ourselves, we just stand aside and let him go on by, then we are back together again."

That vision came true when France announced its return to full participation at the 2009 Strasbourg–Kehl summit.

=== 1962–1991: Détente and escalation ===
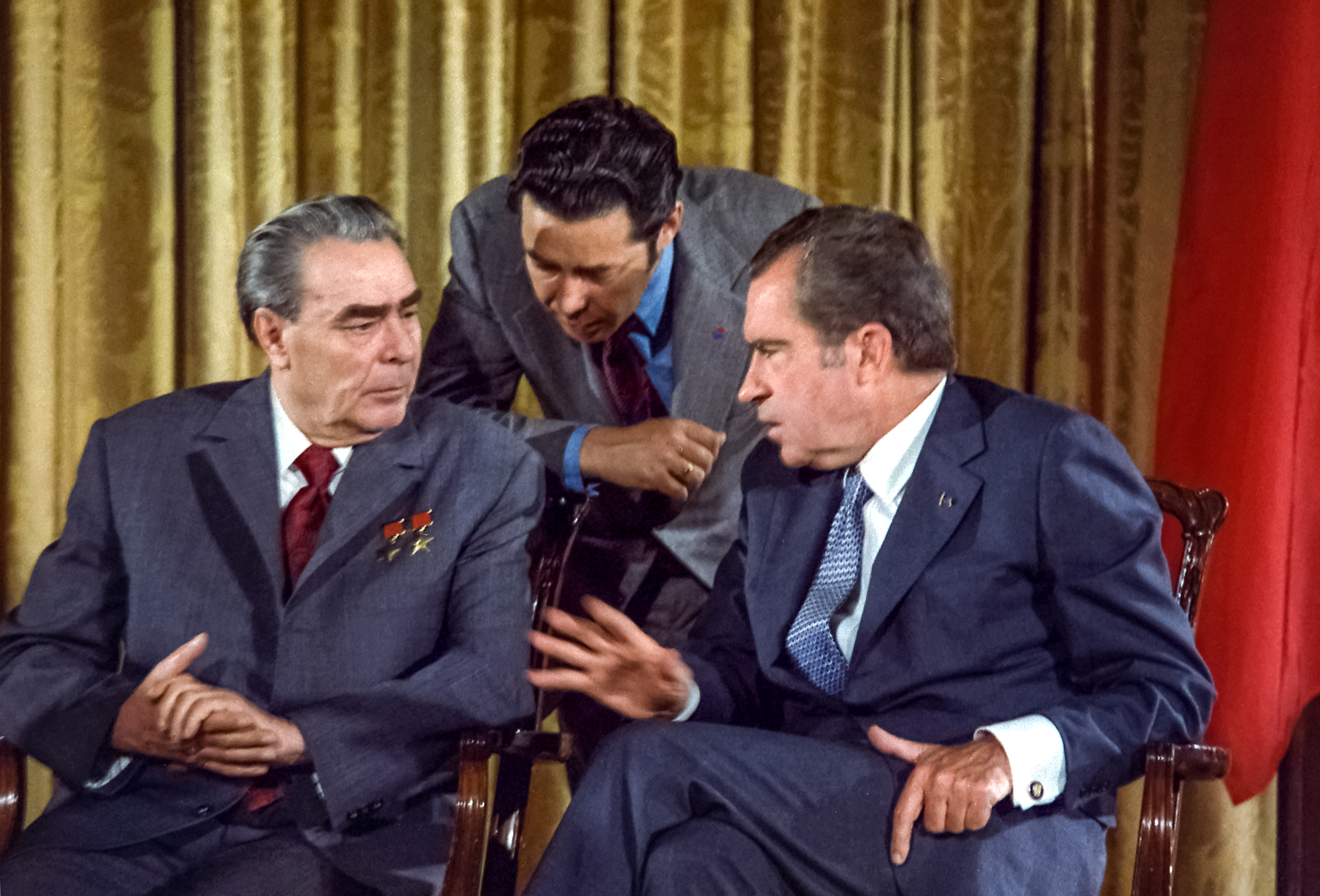
Détente led to many high-level meetings between leaders from both NATO and the Warsaw Pact.

During most of the Cold War, NATO's watch against the Soviet Union and Warsaw Pact did not actually lead to direct military action. On 1 July 1968, the Treaty on the Non-Proliferation of Nuclear Weapons opened for signature. NATO argued that its nuclear sharing arrangements did not breach the treaty since US forces controlled the weapons until a decision was made to go to war when the treaty would no longer be controlling. Few states then knew of the NATO nuclear sharing arrangements, which were not challenged. In May 1978, NATO countries officially defined two complementary aims of the Alliance: to maintain security and pursue détente. That was supposed to mean matching defences at the level rendered necessary by the Warsaw Pact's offensive capabilities without spurring a further arms race.

On 12 December 1979, in light of a build-up of Warsaw Pact nuclear capabilities in Europe, ministers approved the deployment of US GLCM cruise missiles and Pershing II theatre nuclear weapons in Europe. The new warheads were also meant to strengthen the West's negotiating position regarding nuclear disarmament. That policy was called the Dual Track policy. Similarly, in 1983 and 1984, responding to the stationing of Warsaw Pact SS-20 medium-range missiles in Europe, NATO deployed modern Pershing II missiles tasked to hit military targets such as tank formations in the event of war. That action led to peace movement protests throughout Western Europe, and support for their deployment wavered, as many doubted whether the push for deployment could be sustained.

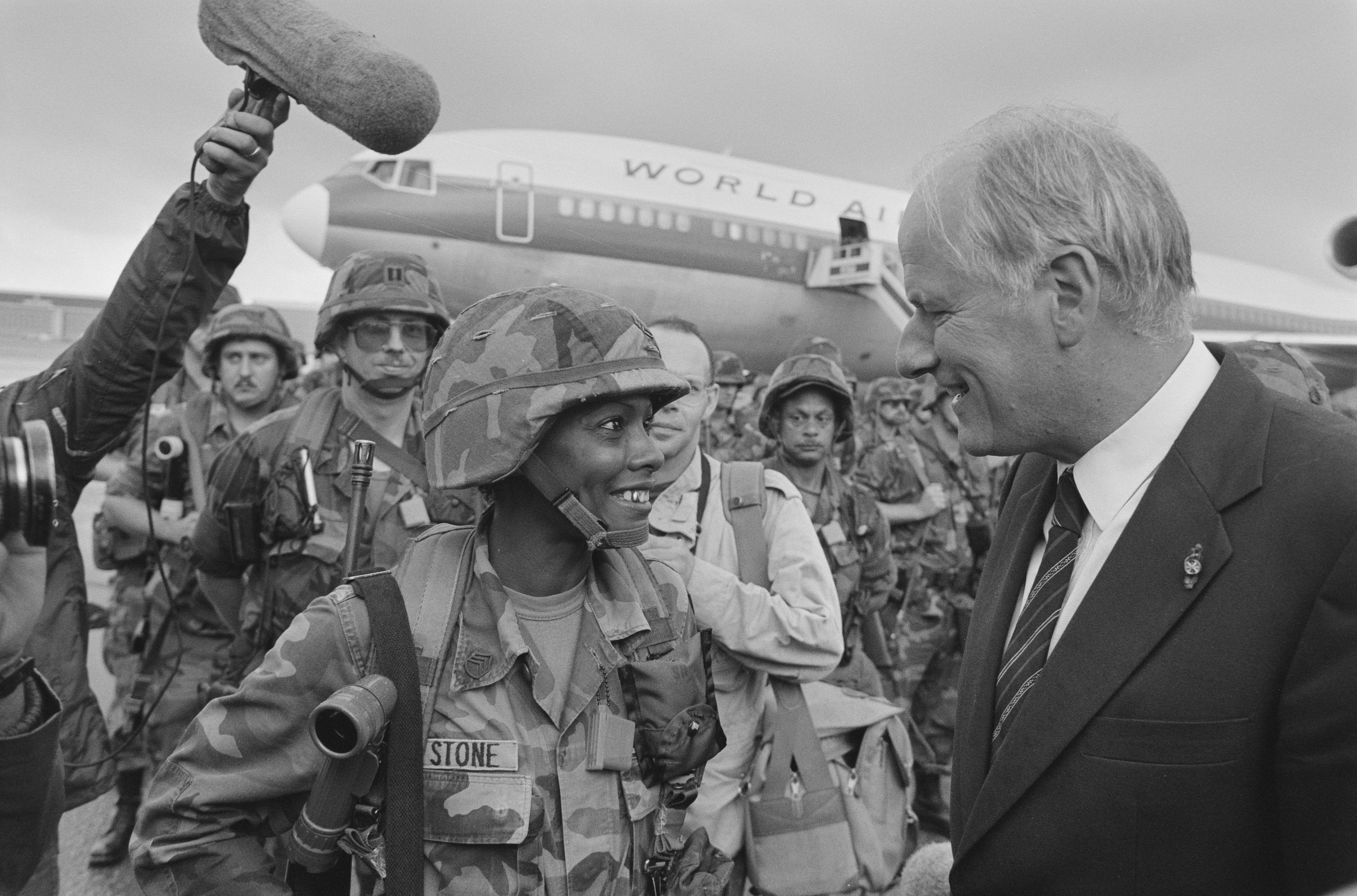
Wim van Eekelen, Minister of Defence of the Netherlands, greeting US soldiers deploying to NATO bases in 1987

The membership of the organisation was then largely static. In 1974, as a consequence of the Turkish invasion of Cyprus, Greece withdrew its forces from NATO's military command structure but, with Turkish co-operation, was readmitted in 1980. The Falklands War between the United Kingdom and Argentina did not result in NATO involvement because Article 6 of the North Atlantic Treaty specifies that collective self-defence is applicable only to attacks on member state territories north of the Tropic of Cancer.

On 30 May 1982, NATO gained a new member when the newly-democratic Spain joined the alliance, as was confirmed by referendum in 1986. At the peak of the Cold War, 16 member nations maintained an approximate strength of 5,252,800 active military personnel, including as many as 435,000 forward-deployed US forces, under a command structure that reached a peak of 78 headquarters, organised into four echelons.

==== 1989 badges ====
Badges of the major NATO commands in 1989

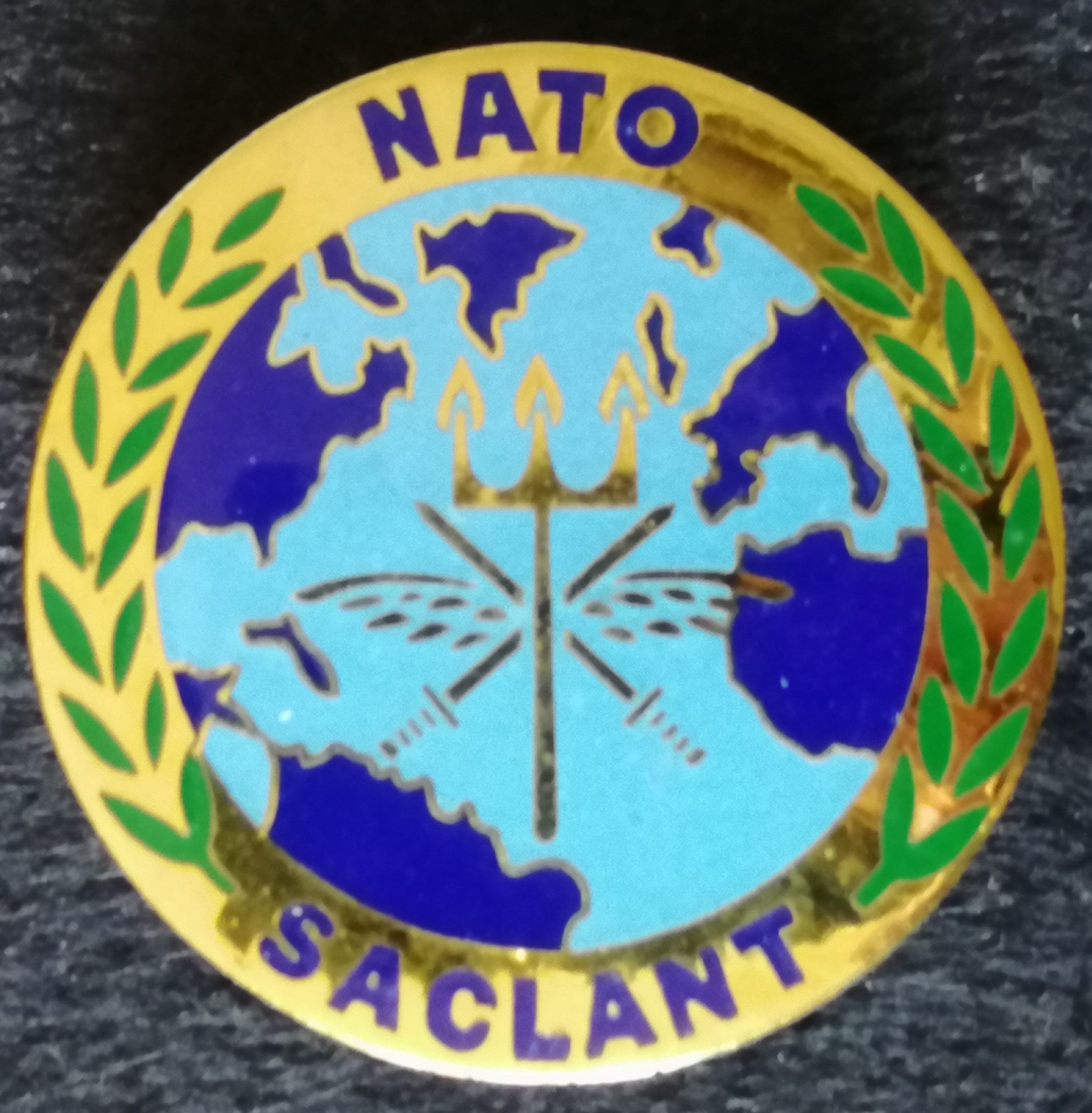
NATO SACLANT badge

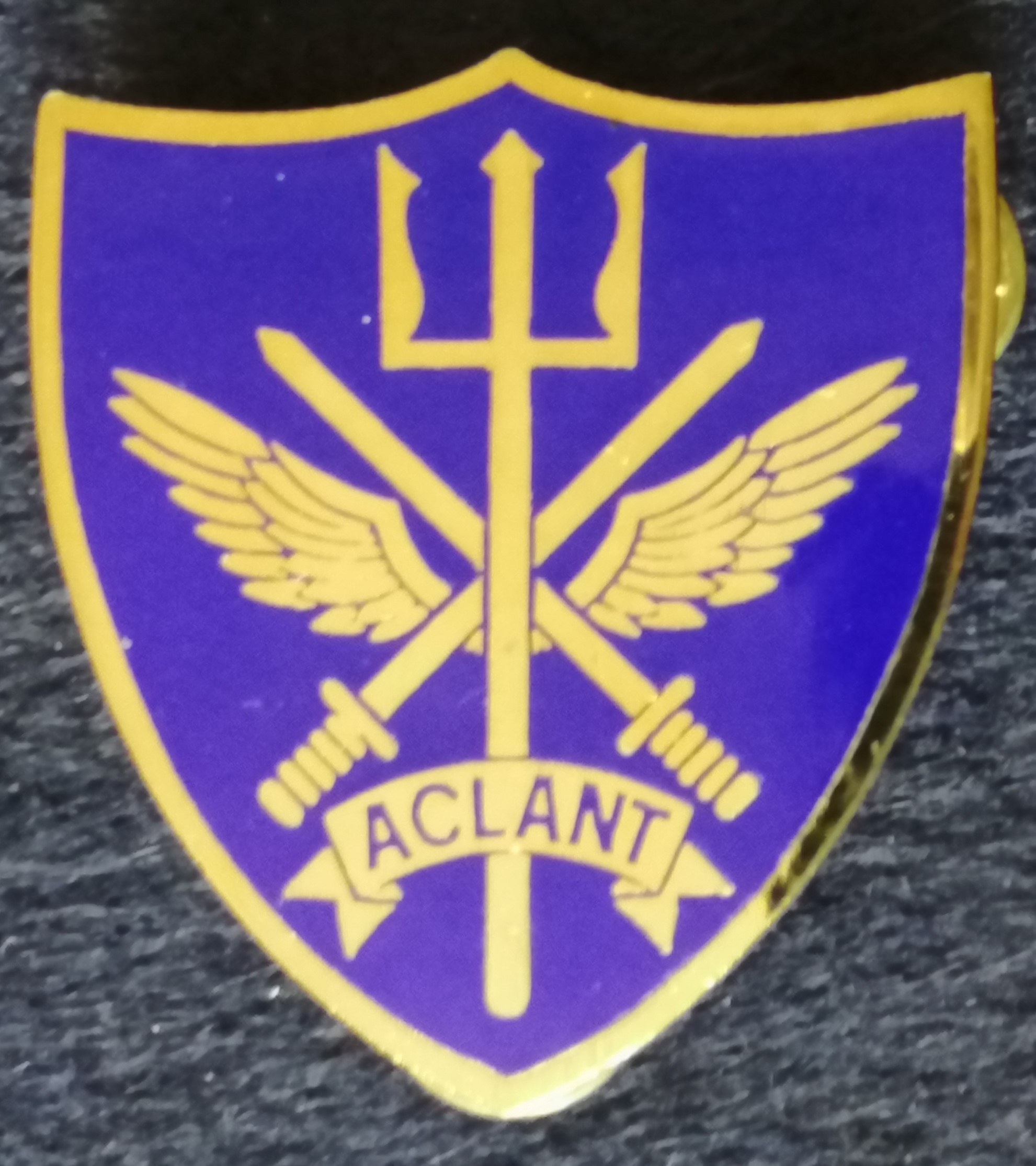
NATO ACLANT badge

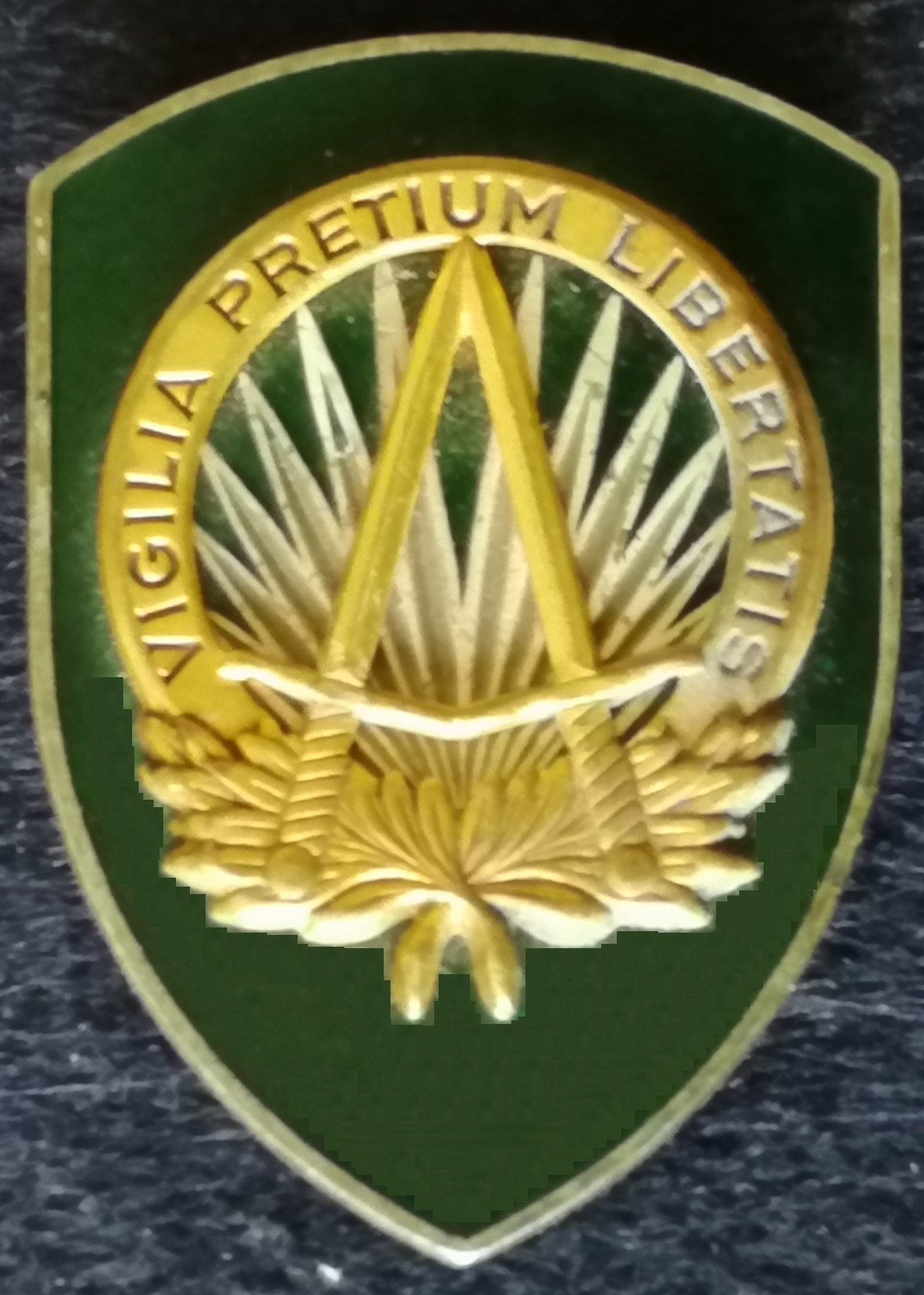
NATO SHAPE badge

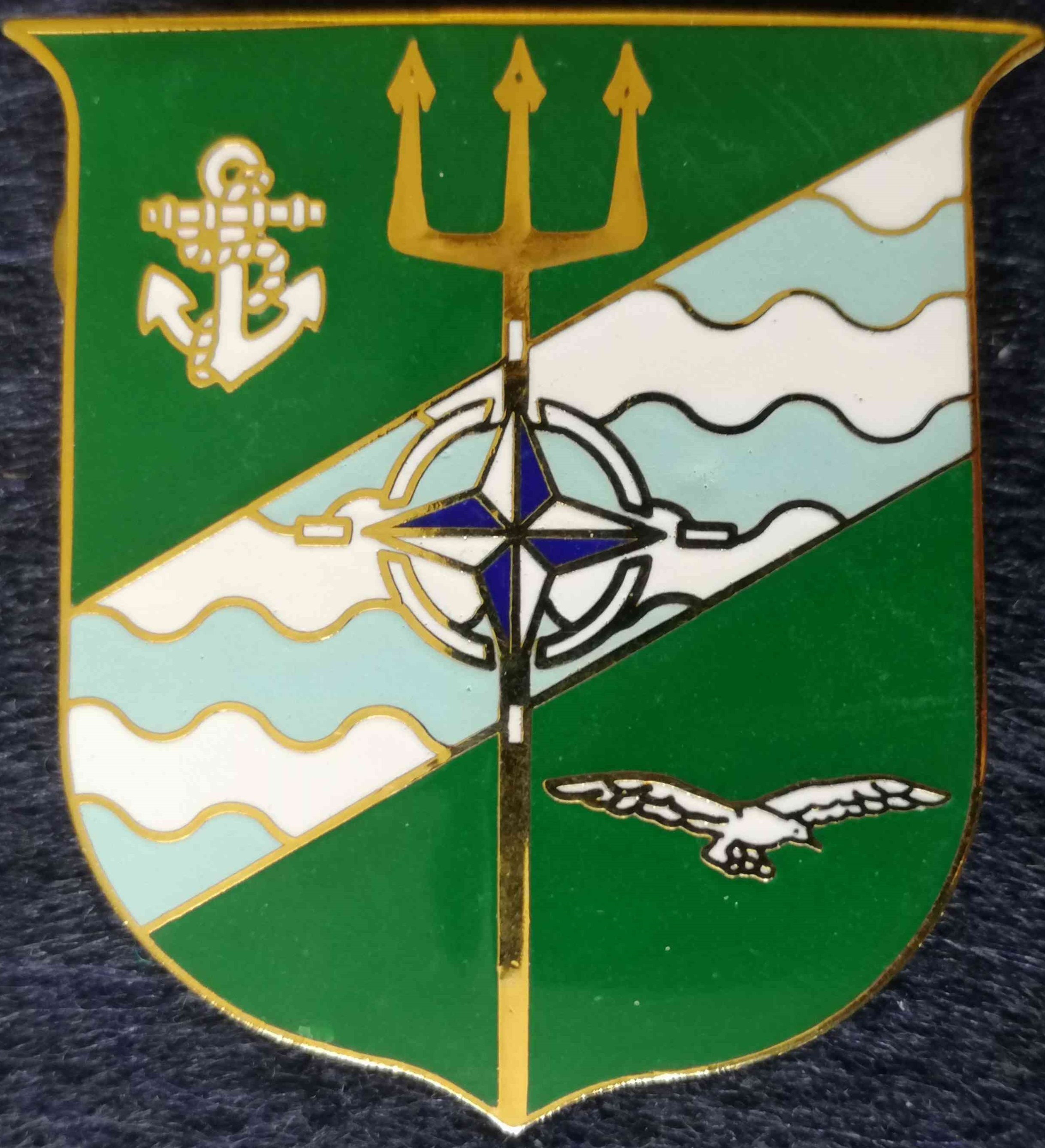
NATO ACCHAN badge

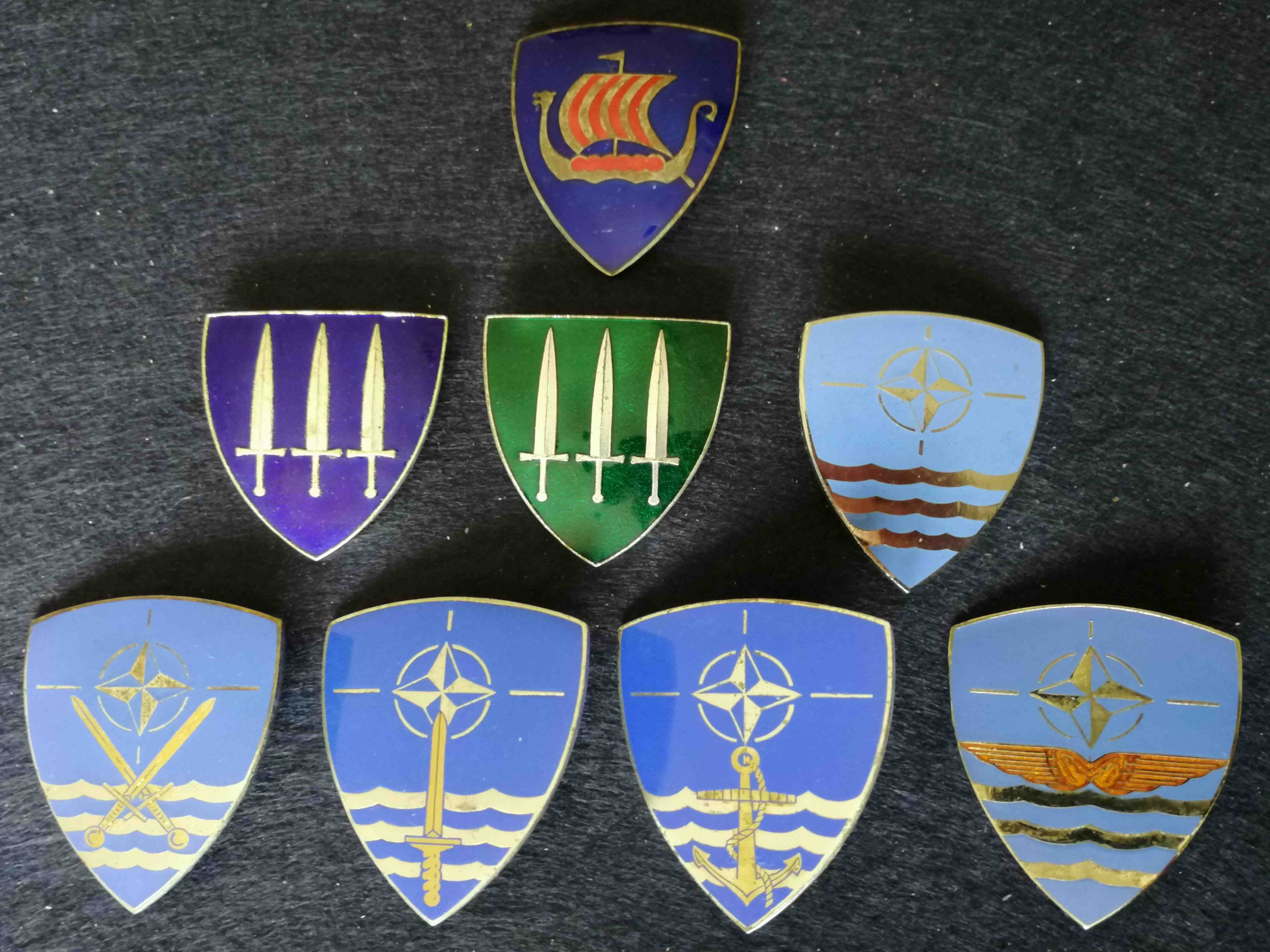
NATO Command AFNORTH badges

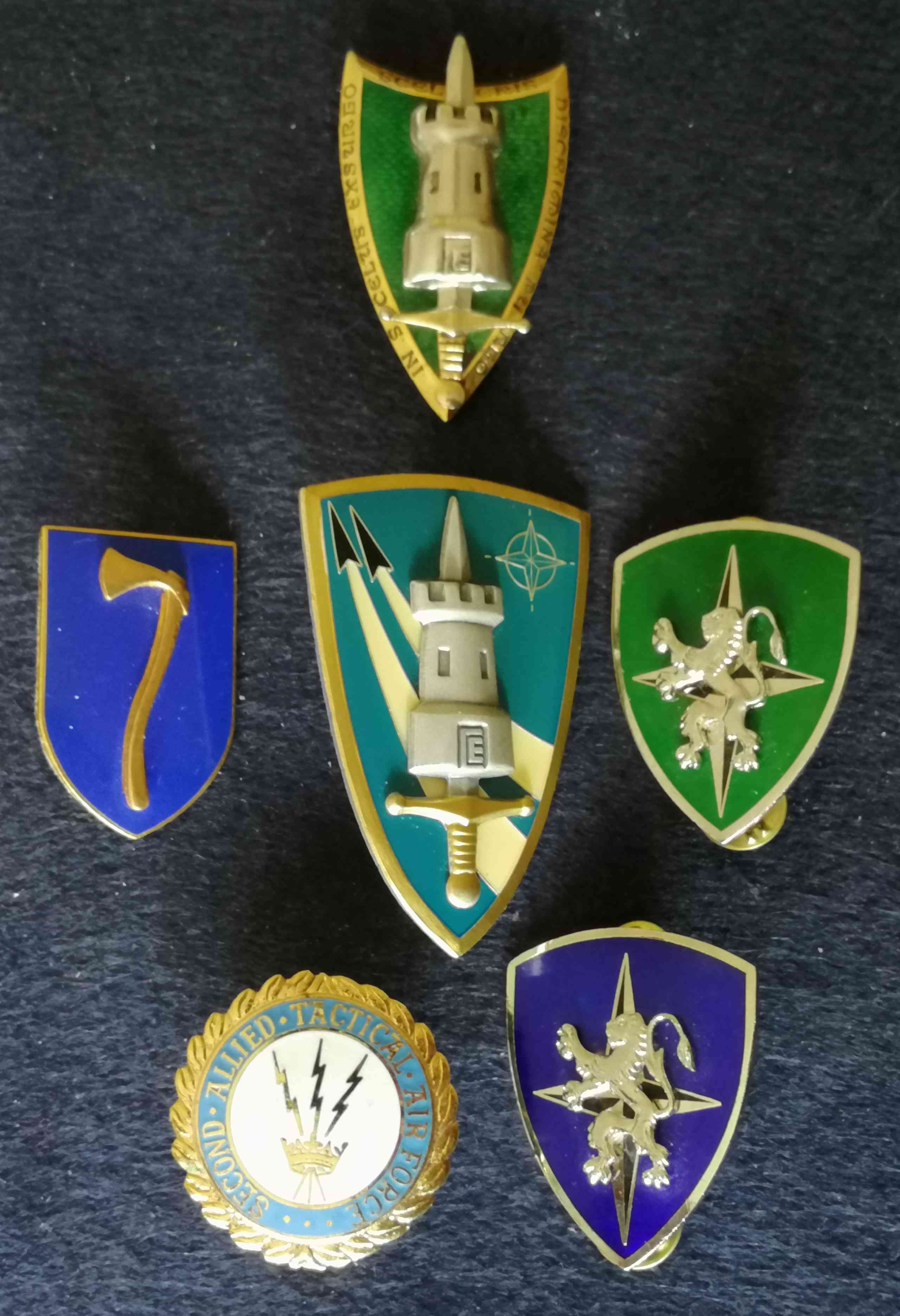
NATO Command AFCENT badges

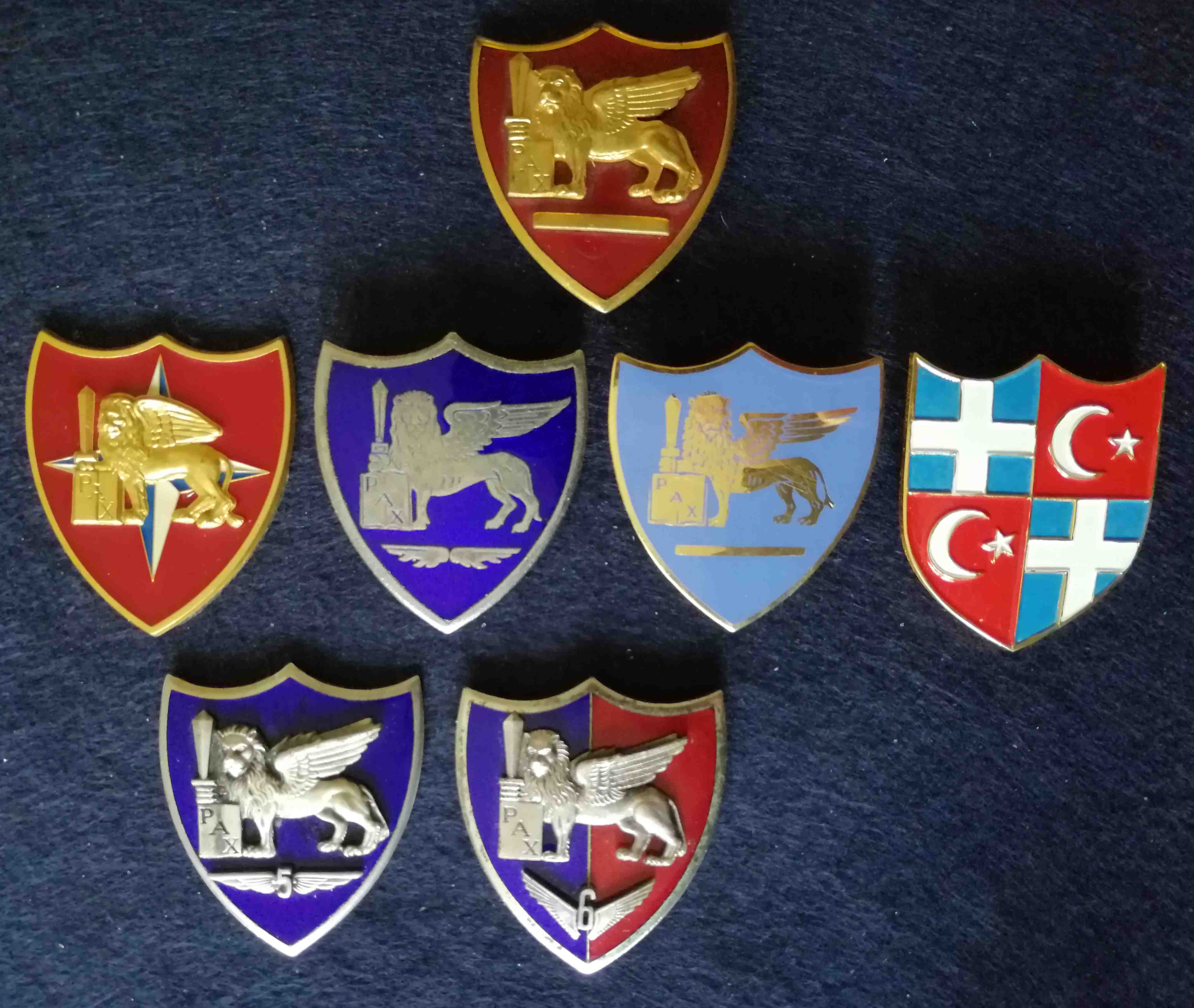
NATO Command AFSOUTH badges

== 1991–present: Post-Cold War ==
=== 1991–2001: Response to the Yugoslav Wars ===
The Revolutions of 1989 and the dissolution of the Warsaw Pact in 1991 removed the de facto main adversary of NATO and caused a strategic re-evaluation of NATO's purpose, nature, tasks, and focus on the continent of Europe. The shift started, with the 1990 signing in Paris of the Treaty on Conventional Armed Forces in Europe between NATO and the Soviet Union, which mandated specific military reductions across the continent, which continued after the dissolution of the Soviet Union in December 1991. European countries then accounted for 34 percent of NATO's military spending; by 2012, that had fallen to 21 percent. NATO also began a gradual expansion to include countries of Central and Eastern Europe and extended its activities into political and humanitarian situations that had not been thought of as NATO concerns.

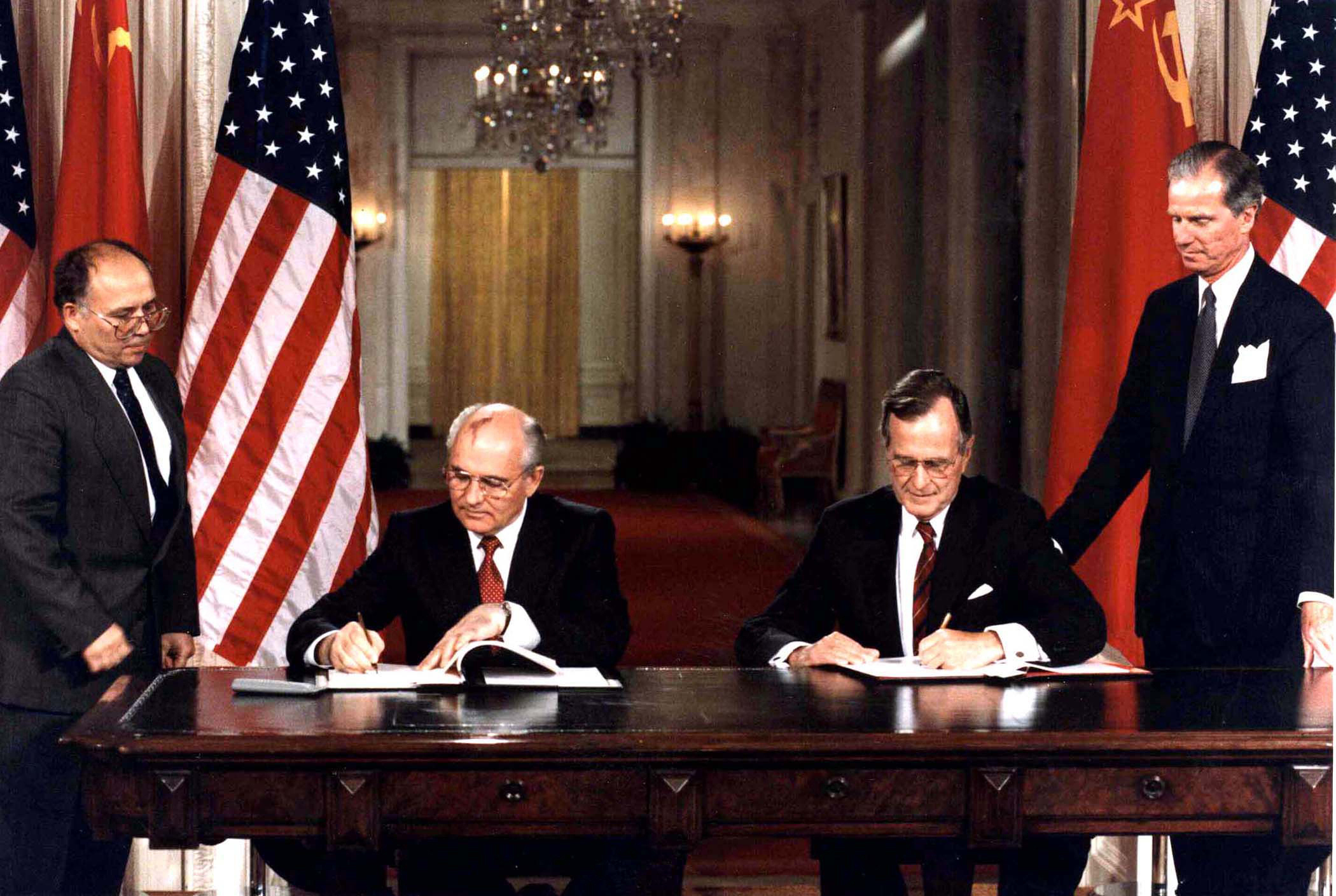
Reforms made under Soviet leader Mikhail Gorbachev led to the end of the Warsaw Pact.

An expansion of NATO came with German reunification on 3 October 1990, when the former East Germany became part of the Federal Republic of Germany and of the alliance. That had been agreed in the Two Plus Four Treaty earlier that year. To secure Soviet approval of a united Germany remaining in NATO, it was agreed that foreign troops and nuclear weapons would not be stationed in the east. There was no formal commitment in the agreement not to expand NATO to the east, but there are diverging views on whether negotiators gave informal commitments regarding further NATO expansion. Jack Matlock, the American ambassador to the Soviet Union during its final years, said that the West gave a "clear commitment" not to expand, and declassified documents indicate that Soviet negotiators had the impression that NATO membership was off the table for countries such as Czechoslovakia, Hungary, or Poland. Hans-Dietrich Genscher, the West German foreign minister, said in a conversation with Eduard Shevardnadze, "For us, however, one thing is certain: NATO will not expand to the east." In 1996, Gorbachev wrote in his Memoirs that "during the negotiations on the unification of Germany they gave assurances that NATO would not extend its zone of operation to the east," and he repeated that view in an interview in 2008. However, in 2014 Gorbachev stated the opposite: "The topic of 'NATO expansion' was not discussed at all [in 1990], and it wasn't brought up in those years. I say this with full responsibility. Western leaders didn't bring it up, either." According to Robert Zoellick, a US State Department official involved in the Two Plus Four negotiating process, that appears to be a misperception, and no formal commitment regarding enlargement was made. Harvard University historian Mark Kramer also rejects that an informal agreement existed. Memorandums published by the National Security Archive in 2017 indicate that multiple assurances against NATO expansion were indeed made to Soviet leaders at the highest levels in 1990 and 1991.

As part of restructuring, NATO's military structure was cut back and reorganized, with new forces such as the Headquarters Allied Command Europe Rapid Reaction Corps established. The changes brought about by the collapse of the Soviet Union on the military balance in Europe were recognized in the Adapted Conventional Armed Forces in Europe Treaty, which was signed by 30 countries in 1999, ratified by Russia in 2000, but never ratified by any NATO member, and therefore never came into effect. The policies of French president Nicolas Sarkozy resulted in a major reform of France's military position, culminating with the return to full membership on 4 April 2009, which also included France rejoining the NATO Military Command Structure but maintaining an independent nuclear deterrent.

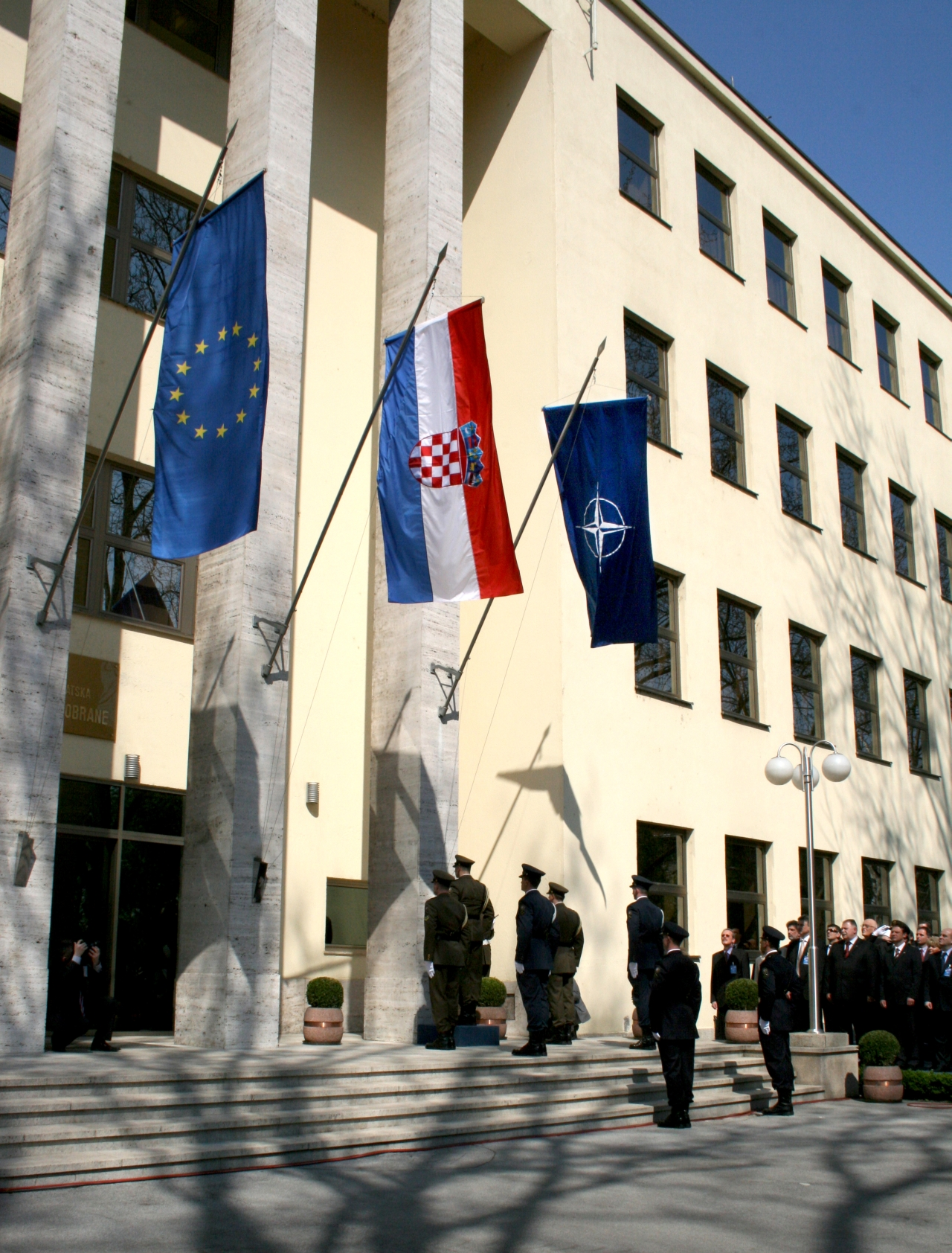
The NATO flag being raised in a ceremony marking Croatia's joining of the alliance in 2009

Between 1994 and 1997, wider forums for regional cooperation between NATO and its neighbors were set up, like the Partnership for Peace, the Mediterranean Dialogue initiative, and the Euro-Atlantic Partnership Council. In 1998, the NATO–Russia Permanent Joint Council was established. On 8 July 1997, three former communist countries (Hungary, the Czech Republic, and Poland) were invited to join NATO, which was accepted by all three, with Hungarian acceptance being endorsed in a referendum in which 85.3% of voters supported joining NATO.

Czech president Václav Havel welcomed the expansion: "Never have we been part of such a broad, solid and binding security alliance, which at the same time respects in its essence the sovereignty and will of our nation." Polish foreign minister Bronislaw Geremek also welcomed the expansion: "Poland forever returns where she has always belonged: the free world." Hungarian foreign minister Janos Martonyi stated that the expansion showed that Hungary was returning "to her natural habitat." The expansion was also welcomed by US Secretary of State Madeleine Albright, who stated that the expansion would do "for Europe's east what NATO has already helped to do for Europe's west: steadily and systematically, we will continue erasing – without replacing – the line drawn in Europe by Stalin's bloody boot."

The expansion was criticized in the US by some policy experts as a "policy error of historic proportions." According to George F. Kennan, an American diplomat and former advocate of the containment policy, the decision "may be expected to have an adverse effect on the development of Russian democracy; to restore the atmosphere of the cold war to East-West relations, to impel Russian foreign policy in directions decidedly not to our liking."

Membership went on expanding with the accession of seven more Central and Eastern European countries to NATO: Estonia, Latvia, Lithuania, Slovenia, Slovakia, Bulgaria, and Romania. They were first invited to start talks of membership during the 2002 Prague summit and joined NATO on 29 March 2004, shortly before the 2004 Istanbul summit. Slovenian membership was endorsed in a referendum in which 66.02% of voters supported joining. The entry of Romania into NATO is particularly notable as it put the strategic Focșani Gate under NATO control.

New NATO structures were also formed while old ones were abolished. In 1997, NATO reached agreement on a significant downsizing of its command structure from 65 headquarters to 20.

=== 2001–2008: War on terror ===
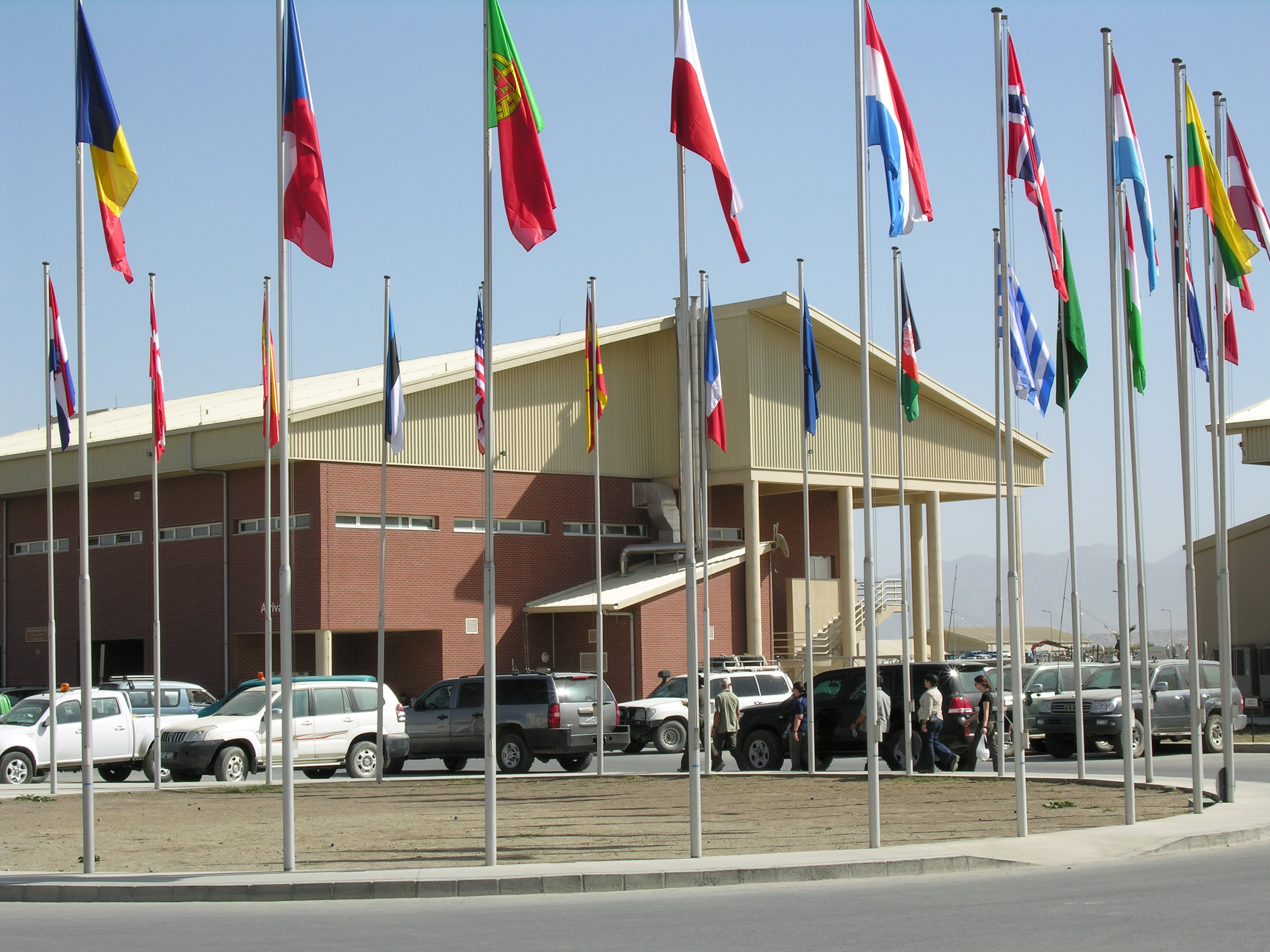
ISAF's military terminal at Kabul International Airport in September 2010

The NATO Response Force (NRF) was launched at the 2002 Prague summit on 21 November, the first summit in a former Comecon country. On 19 June 2003, a further restructuring of the NATO military commands began as the Headquarters of the Supreme Allied Commander, Atlantic were abolished and a new command, Allied Command Transformation (ACT), was established in Norfolk, Virginia, United States, and the Supreme Headquarters Allied Powers Europe (SHAPE) became the Headquarters of Allied Command Operations (ACO). ACT is responsible for driving transformation (future capabilities) in NATO while ACO is responsible for current operations. In March 2004, NATO's Baltic Air Policing began, which supported the sovereignty of Latvia, Lithuania, and Estonia by providing jet fighters to react to any unwanted aerial intrusions. Eight multinational jet fighters are based in Lithuania, the number of which was increased from four in 2014. Also at the 2004 Istanbul summit, NATO launched the Istanbul Cooperation Initiative with four Persian Gulf nations.

The 2006 Riga summit was held in Riga, Latvia, and highlighted the issue of energy security. It was the first NATO summit to be held in a country that had been part of the old Soviet Union.

=== 2008–present: Renewed focus on territorial defense ===
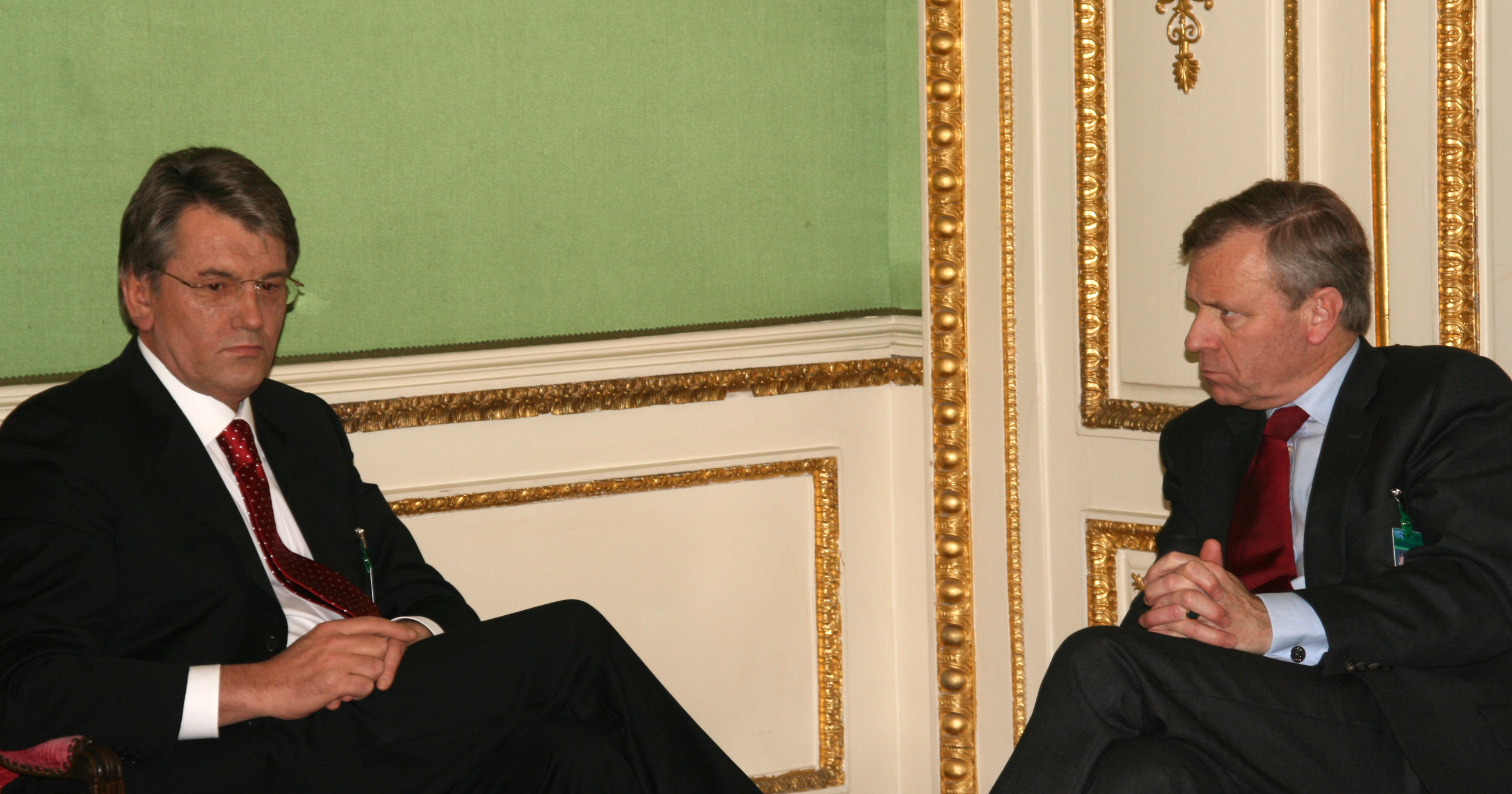
Meetings between the government of Ukrainian President Viktor Yushchenko and NATO leaders led to the Intensified Dialogue program.

At the April 2008 summit in Bucharest, Romania, NATO agreed to the accession of Albania and Croatia, both of which joined NATO in April 2009. Georgia and Ukraine were also told that they could eventually become members. The issue of Georgian and Ukrainian membership in NATO prompted harsh criticism from Russia, as did NATO plans for a missile defence system. Studies for the system had begun in 2002, with negotiations centered on anti-ballistic missiles being stationed in Poland and the Czech Republic. Though NATO leaders gave assurances that the system was not targeting Russia, Russian presidents Vladimir Putin and Dmitry Medvedev criticized the system as a threat.

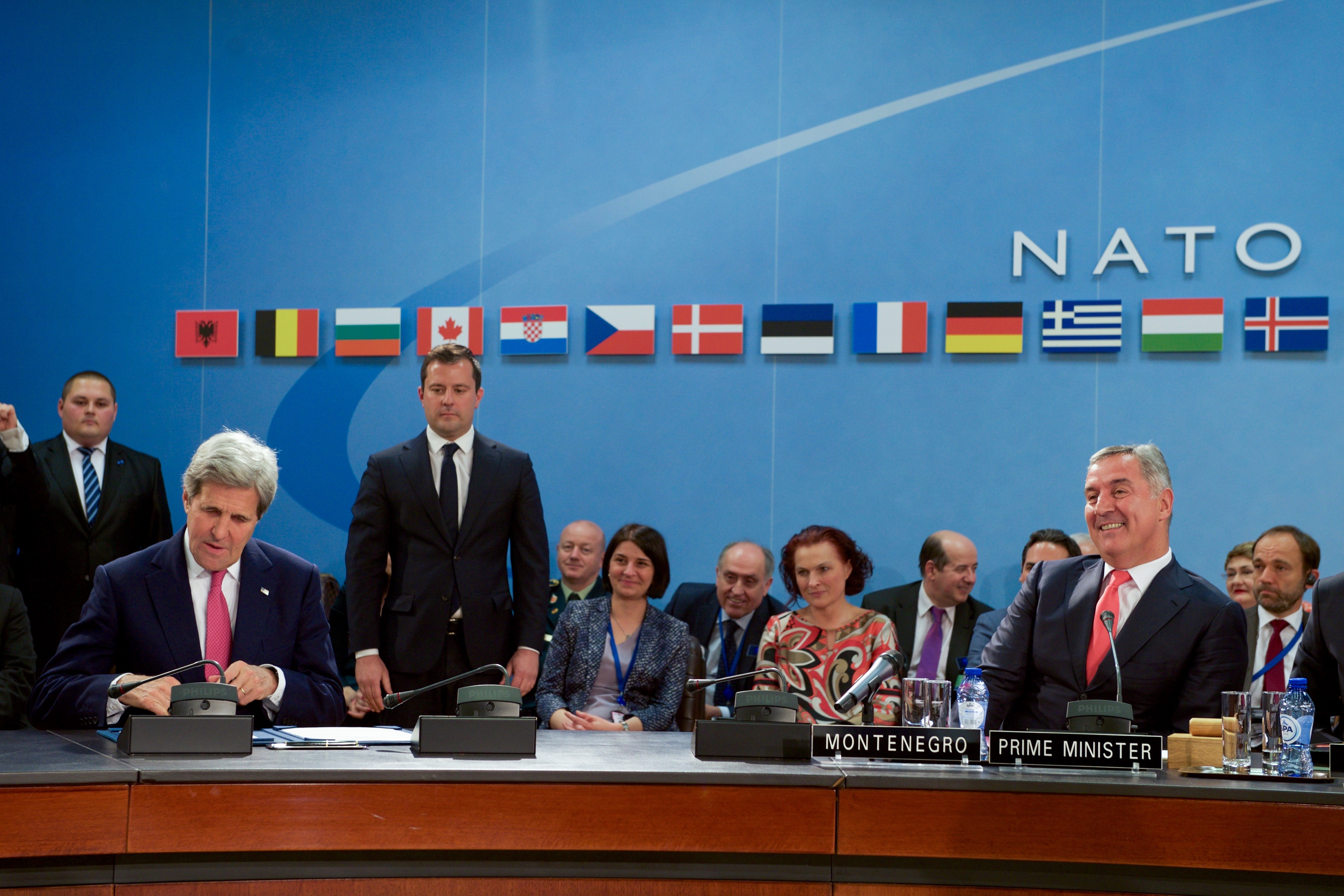
NATO foreign ministers and Montenegro's Prime Minister Milo Đukanović signed a protocol at the NATO Council in 2016

In 2009, US president Barack Obama proposed using the ship-based Aegis Combat System, but the plan still includes stations being built in Turkey, Spain, Portugal, Romania, and Poland. NATO will also maintain the "status quo" in its nuclear deterrent in Europe by upgrading the targeting capabilities of the "tactical" B61 nuclear bombs stationed there and deploying them on the stealthier Lockheed Martin F-35 Lightning II. On 15 June 2016, NATO officially recognized cyberwarfare as an operational domain of war, just like land, sea, and aerial warfare. That means that any cyber attack on NATO members can trigger Article 5 of the North Atlantic Treaty. Likewise, on 4 December 2019, NATO additionally recognized space warfare as an operational domain of war.

Montenegro became the 29th member of NATO on 5 June 2017, amid strong objections from Russia. On 27 March 2020, North Macedonia became the 30th member after a dispute about its name was resolved with Greece.

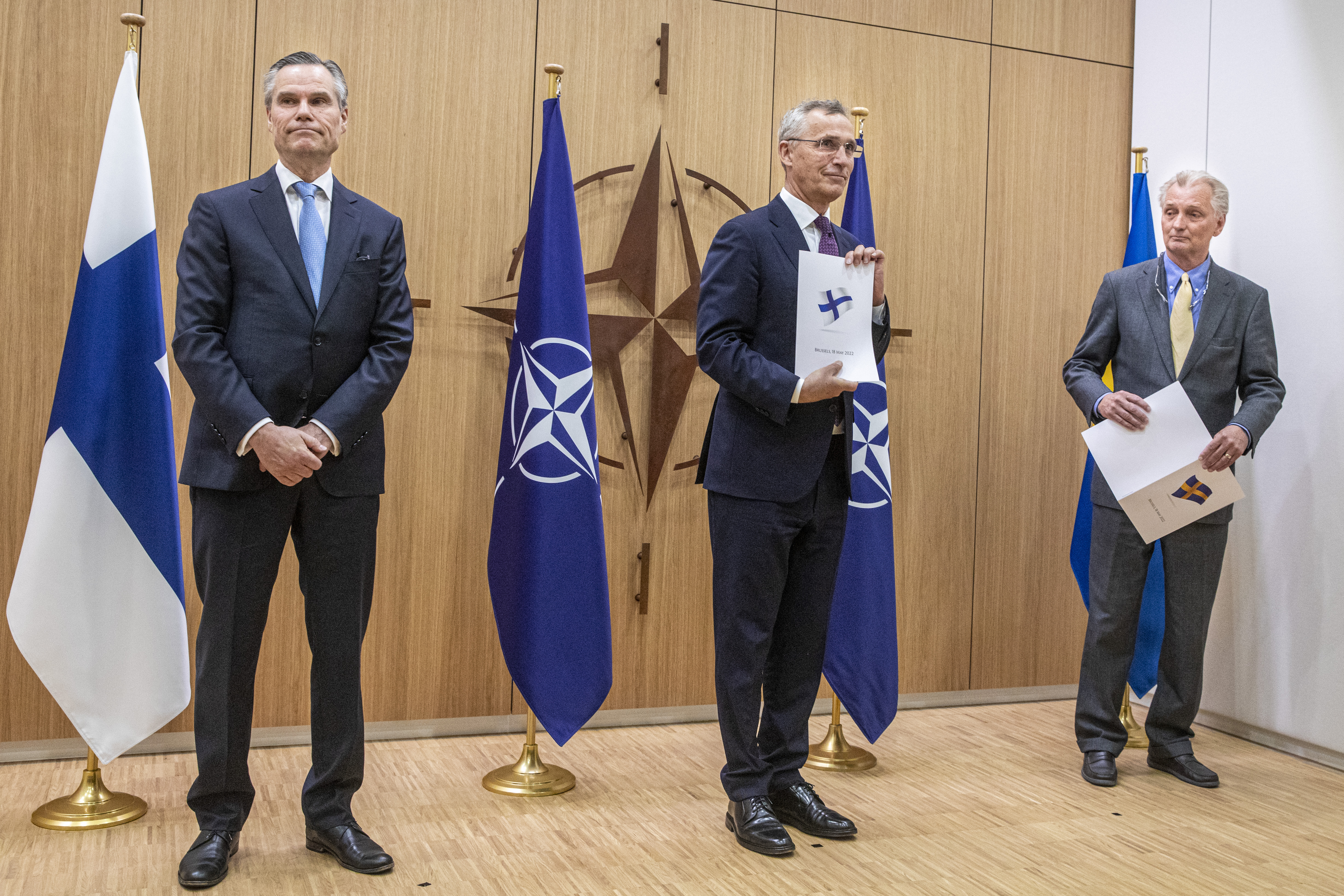
Finnish and Swedish ambassadors submitting their applications to join NATO to Secretary-General Jens Stoltenberg

The 2014 Russian annexation of Crimea led to strong condemnation by NATO nations, and Poland invoked Article 4 in meetings. At the 2014 Wales summit, the leaders of NATO's member states formally committed for the first time spend the equivalent of at least 2% of their gross domestic product on defence by 2024, which was previously only an informal guideline. In February 2015, NATO committed to forming a new "spearhead" force of 5000 troops at bases in Estonia, Lithuania, Latvia, Poland, Romania, and Bulgaria.

NATO did not condemn the 2016–present purges in Turkey. As a result of the Turkish invasion of Kurdish-inhabited areas in Syria, Turkey's intervention in Libya and the Cyprus–Turkey maritime zones dispute, there are signs of a schism between Turkey and other NATO members. On 1 August 2018, the US Department of Treasury sanctioned two senior Turkish government ministers who were involved in the detention of American pastor Andrew Brunson. Turkish president Recep Tayyip Erdoğan said that the US behavior would force Turkey to look for new friends and allies. The US–Turkey dispute appears to be one of the most serious diplomatic crisis between the NATO allies in years.

The 2022 Russian invasion of Ukraine led eight NATO countries—Bulgaria, the Czech Republic, Estonia, Latvia, Lithuania, Poland, Romania and Slovakia—to trigger Article 4. The North Atlantic Council issued a statement in which it condemned the invasion "in the strongest possible terms". Elements of the NATO Response Force were activated for the first time in NATO's history. In March, NATO leaders met at Brussels for an extraordinary summit which also involved Group of Seven and European Union leaders. NATO member states agreed to establish four additional battlegroups in Bulgaria, Hungary, Romania and Slovakia. The aircraft carrier USS Harry S. Truman and its carrier strike group were placed under the command of Naval Striking and Support Forces NATO, marking the first time an entire US carrier group was placed under NATO command since the Cold War. Finland and Sweden applied to join NATO on 18 May 2022 in response to the Russian invasion of Ukraine. On the same day, Turkey temporarily blocked the membership bids of the two countries on the grounds that they support the PKK, YPG and the Gülen movement, which Turkey considers terrorists. On 28 June 2022, Finland and Sweden signed a trilateral memorandum with Turkey to address Turkey's security concerns. On the same day, Turkey agreed to support the membership bids of both countries. Finland became a member on 4 April 2023, while Sweden joined on 7 March 2024.

=== 2024–present: American detachment from NATO ===
Plans of "Greater United States", including Canada and Greenland, according to expansionist designs proposed by US president Donald Trump in 2024. Both territories are under NATO protections.

Since the second presidency of Donald Trump, the United States, a core member and major funder of NATO, has adopted an isolationist (Make America Great Again) and expansionist foreign policy against NATO itself and the majority of its member states, triggering an unprecedented crisis. In December 2024, president-elect Donald Trump suggested that he might support withdrawal from NATO in light of low defense spending by America's European allies. During his election campaign, Trump said that European allies "treat us actually worse than our so-called enemies". Trump said he would not defend NATO allies in Europe if they did not meet the alliance's target of spending 2% of GDP on defense, and instead he would "encourage" Russia to "do whatever the hell they want".

During this time, the United States has threatened the sovereignty of two NATO-founding members, Canada and the Kingdom of Denmark. Between December 2024 and May 2025, Trump and some of his supporters expressed support for Canada's annexation to the United States, with Trump later reiterating these desires throughout his first 100 days in office. The decision was met with broadly negative reception amongst Canadian politicians and the public, with Canadian prime minister Justin Trudeau stating that "There isn't a snowball's chance in hell that Canada would become part of the United States.", and an increase in Canadian nationalism since January 2025, including boycotts of American-manufactured goods.

Since January 2025, Trump stated that he wished to buy Greenland, an autonomous territory of Denmark, or, take Greenland by force for "national security" purposes under the rationale of Arctic security and mineral harvesting in Greenland, triggering the Greenland crisis. In response, the majority of European NATO members, excluding the Czech Republic, Hungary, and Slovakia, have united behind Denmark and condemned American threats, with warnings that Trump's threats have fundamentally undermined trust in the United States as a security and economic partner, accelerating efforts to reduce reliance on them and to develop independent European defence and security, and political coordination structures. EU Defence Commissioner Andrius Kubilius warned that it would be the end of NATO if the US invaded Greenland and said that EU members would be under obligation to come to Denmark's assistance. Beginning in January 2026, several NATO members, with an initial coalition consisting of France, Norway, Germany, Sweden, Finland, the Netherlands, and the United Kingdom, began deploying troops and military staff to Greenland as part of Operation Arctic Endurance in response to the crisis. Despite officially being aimed at increasing defense in the Arctic region, the deployment was interpreted by non-governmental analysts as a tripwire force aimed at preventing a potential American invasion.

In February 2026, NATO announced a new distribution of senior officer responsibility across the NATO Command Structure, in which the United States will hand over its command of JFC Norfolk to the United Kingdom, and JFC Naples to Italy, pushing for a more European leadership of NATO.

== Structural changes ==
1952 NATO organisational chart

The Defence Planning Committee was a former senior decision-making body on matters relating to the integrated military structure of the Alliance. It was dissolved after a major committee review in June 2010, with its responsibilities absorbed by the North Atlantic Council.

=== Civilian structure ===
In NATO: The First Five Years, Lord Ismay described the civilian structure as follows:

The Office of the Secretary-General [is] directed by an Executive Secretary, Captain R.D. Coleridge (UK), who is also Secretary to the Council. He is responsible for supervising the general processing of the work of the Council and their committees, including the provision of all secretarial assistance, as well as supervision of the administrative services of the Staff/Secretariat itself. Thus the Secretariat provides secretaries to all the Council's principal committees and working groups - apart from those of a strictly technical nature - and ensures coordination between them... On the Staff side, there are three main divisions corresponding to the three principal aspects of NATO's work, each under an Assistant Secretary-General. Ambassador Sergio Fenoaltea (Italy) heads the Political Affairs Division, M. Rene Sergent (France) the Economics and Finance Division, and Mr. Lowell P. Weicker (USA) the Production and Logistics Division. The Divisions' tasks are to prepare, in close touch with delegations, proposed action in their respective fields for consideration by the appropriate committee or by the Council. In addition to the main divisions, there are three other offices working directly to the Secretary-General. These are the Office of Statistics (Mr. Loring Wood of the USA), the Financial Comptroller's Office (M. A. J. Bastin of Belgium), and the Division of Information (Mr. Geoffrey Parsons, Jr. of the USA). The Information Division, besides providing material about NATO for the use of member governments, (it does not engage in independent operations), is also the press and public relations branch of the civilian authority.

=== Military structure ===
The Strategic Commanders were the former Major NATO Commanders, who sat atop a command hierarchy consisting of Major Subordinate Commanders (MSCs), Principal Subordinate Commanders (PSCs), and Sub-PSCs. The Military Committee had an executive body, the Standing Group, made up of representatives from France, the United States, and the United Kingdom. The Standing Group was abolished during the major reform of 1967 that resulted from France's departure from the NATO Military Command Structure.

Coats of arms of historical NATO commands

Allied Command Europe: Supreme Headquarters

Allied Command Europe: Allied Forces Northern Europe

Allied Command Europe: Allied Forces Central Europe

Allied Command Europe: Allied Forces Southern Europe

Allied Command Channel

Allied Command Atlantic

==== Beginnings ====
NATO military command and areas of responsibilities (1954)

A key step in establishing the NATO Command Structure was the North Atlantic Council's selection of General Dwight Eisenhower as the first Supreme Allied Commander Europe (SACEUR) in December 1950. After Eisenhower arrived in Paris in January 1951, he and the other members of the multinational Supreme Headquarters Allied Powers Europe (SHAPE) Planning Group immediately began to devise a structure for the new Allied Command Europe. NATO official documents state, "The cornerstone of the NATO Military Command Structure was laid... when the North Atlantic Council approved D.C. 24/3 on 18 December 1951." They quickly decided to divide Allied Command Europe into three regions: Allied Forces Northern Europe, containing Scandinavia, the North Sea, and the Baltic; Allied Forces Central Europe, and Allied Forces Southern Europe (AFSOUTH), covering Italy and the Mediterranean. SHAPE was established at Rocquencourt, west of Paris.

The British post of Commander in Chief Mediterranean Fleet was given a dual-hatted role as NATO Commander in Chief of Allied Forces Mediterranean in charge of all forces assigned to NATO in the Mediterranean Area. The British made strong representations in discussions regarding the Mediterranean NATO command structure since they wished to retain their direction of NATO naval command in the Mediterranean to protect their sea lines of communication running through the Mediterranean to the Middle East and the Far East.

In 1952, after Greece and Turkey joined NATO Allied Land Forces South-Eastern Europe (LANDSOUTHEAST) was created in İzmir, Turkey, under a US Army General because of the geographic distance of both countries from the LANDSOUTH headquarters as well as political disagreements over which nation should be the overall commander for its ground forces.

With the establishment of Allied Command Atlantic (ACLANT) on 30 January 1952, the Supreme Allied Commander Atlantic joined the previously created Supreme Allied Commander Europe as one of the alliance's two Major NATO Commanders. A third was added when Allied Command Channel was established on 21 February 1952 to control the English Channel and North Sea area and deny them to the enemy and to protect the sea lanes of communication. The establishment of this post and the agreement that it was to be filled by the British Commander-in-Chief, Portsmouth, was part of the compromise that allowed an American officer to take up the SACLANT post. Previously Commander-in-Chief Portsmouth had controlled multinational naval operations in the area under WUDO auspices. In due course, the CINCHAN role was assumed by the British Commander-in-Chief Fleet.

In 1966, when French president Charles de Gaulle withdrew French forces from the military command structure, NATO's headquarters was forced to move to Belgium. SHAPE was moved to Casteau, north of the Belgian city of Mons. Headquarters Allied Forces Central Europe was moved from the Chateau de Fontainebleau, near Paris to Brunssum, in the Netherlands.

==== Structure in 1989 ====
- NATO Military Committee, led by the Chairman of the NATO Military Committee, in Brussels, Belgium
  - Allied Command Europe (ACE), led by Supreme Allied Commander Europe (SACEUR), in Mons, Belgium
    - ACE Mobile Force, in Seckenheim, Germany
    - United Kingdom Air Forces, in High Wycombe, United Kingdom
    - NATO Airborne Early Warning Force, in Maisieres, Belgium
    - Allied Forces Northern Europe (AFNORTH), in Kolsås, Norway
      - Allied Forces North Norway (NON), in Bodø, Norway
      - Allied Forces South Norway (SONOR), in Stavanger, Norway
      - Allied Forces Baltic Approaches (BALTAP), in Karup, Denmark
        - Allied Land Forces Schleswig-Holstein and Jutland (LANDJUT), in Rendsburg, Germany
        - Allied Land Forces in Zealand (LANDZEALAND), in Ringsted, Denmark
        - Allied Air Forces Baltic Approaches (AIRBALTAP), in Karup, Denmark
        - Allied Naval Forces Baltic Approaches (NAVBALTAP), in Karup, Denmark
    - Allied Forces Central Europe (AFCENT), in Brunssum, Netherlands
      - Northern Army Group (NORTHAG), in Rheindahlen, West Germany
      - Central Army Group (CENTAG), in Heidelberg, West Germany
      - Allied Air Forces Central Europe (AAFCE), in Ramstein, West Germany
        - Second Allied Tactical Air Force (2 ATAF), in Rheindahlen, West Germany
        - Fourth Allied Tactical Air Force (4 ATAF), in Ramstein, West Germany
    - Allied Forces Southern Europe (AFSOUTH), in Naples, Italy
      - Allied Land Forces Southern Europe (LANDSOUTH), in Verona, Italy
      - Allied Land Forces South-Eastern Europe (LANDSOUTHEAST), in İzmir, Turkey
      - Allied Air Forces Southern Europe (AIRSOUTH), in Naples, Italy
        - Fifth Allied Tactical Air Force (5 ATAF), in Vicenza, Italy
        - Sixth Allied Tactical Air Force (6 ATAF), in İzmir, Turkey
      - Allied Naval Forces Southern Europe (NAVSOUTH), in Naples, Italy
      - Naval Striking and Support Forces Southern Europe (STRIKFORSOUTH), afloat, centered around US Sixth Fleet
  - Allied Command Atlantic (ACLANT), led by Supreme Allied Commander Atlantic (SACLANT), in Norfolk, United States
    - Eastern Atlantic Area (EASTLANT), in Northwood, United Kingdom
      - Northern Sub-Area (NORLANT), in Rosyth, United Kingdom
      - Central Sub-Area (CENTLANT), in Plymouth, United Kingdom
      - Submarine Force Eastern Atlantic (SUBEASTLANT), in Gosport, United Kingdom
      - Maritime Air Eastern Atlantic (MAIREASTLANT), in Northwood, United Kingdom
        - Maritime Air Northern Sub-Area (MAIRNORLANT), in Rosyth, United Kingdom
        - Maritime Air Central Sub-Area (MAIRCENTLANT), in Plymouth, United Kingdom
      - Island Command Iceland (ISCOMICELAND), in Keflavík, Iceland
      - Island Command Faroes (ISCOMFAROES), in Tórshavn, Faroe Islands
    - Western Atlantic Area (WESTLANT), in Norfolk, United States
      - Ocean Sub-Area (OCEANLANT), in Norfolk, United States
      - Canadian Atlantic Sub-Area (CANLANT), in Halifax, Canada
      - Island Command Bermuda (ISCOMBERMUDA), in Hamilton, Bermuda
      - Island Command Azores (ISCOMAZORES), in Ponta Delgada, Azores
      - Island Command Greenland (ISCOMGREENLAND), in Grønnedal, Greenland
      - Submarine Force Western Atlantic (SUBWESTLANT), in Norfolk, United States
    - Iberian Atlantic Area (IBERLANT), in Oeiras, Portugal
      - Island Command Madeira (ISCOMADEIRA), in Funchal, Madeira
    - Striking Fleet Atlantic (STRIKFLTLANT), in Norfolk, United States
      - Carrier Striking Force (CARSTRIKFOR), in Norfolk, United States
        - Carrier Striking Group One (CARSTRIKGRUONE), in Norfolk, United States
        - Carrier Striking Group Two (CARSTRIKGRUTWO), in Plymouth, United Kingdom
    - Submarines Allied Command Atlantic (SUBACLANT), in Norfolk, United States
  - Allied Command Channel (ACCHAN), in Northwood, United Kingdom
    - Nore Sub-Area Channel Command (NORECHAN), in Rosyth, United Kingdom
    - Plymouth Sub-Area Channel Command (PLYMCHAN), in Plymouth, United Kingdom
    - Benelux Sub-Area Channel Command (BENECHAN), in Den Helder, Netherlands
    - Allied Maritime Air Force Channel (MAIRCHAN), in Northwood, United Kingdom
      - Maritime Air Nore Sub-Area Channel Command (MAIRNORECHAN), in Rosyth, United Kingdom
      - Maritime Air Plymouth Sub-Area Channel Command (MAIRPLYMCHAN), in Plymouth, United Kingdom
    - Standing Naval Force Channel (STANAVFORCHAN), afloat

==== After Cold War ====
By June 1991, it was clear that Allied Forces Central Europe, a Major Subordinate Command, could be reduced, with the Soviet threat disappearing. Six multinational corps were to replace the previous eight. Announcements in June 1991 presaged main defensive forces consisting of six multinational corps. Two were to be under German command, one with a US division, one under Belgian command with a pending offer of a U.S. brigade, one under U.S. command with a German division, one under joint German-Danish command (LANDJUT), and one under Dutch command. The new German IV Corps was to be stationed in eastern German and was not to be associated with the NATO structure.

On July 1, 1994, the Alliance disestablished Allied Command Channel but retained many of its subordinate structures after the reshuffling. Most of the headquarters were absorbed within ACE, particularly within the new Allied Forces Northwestern Europe.

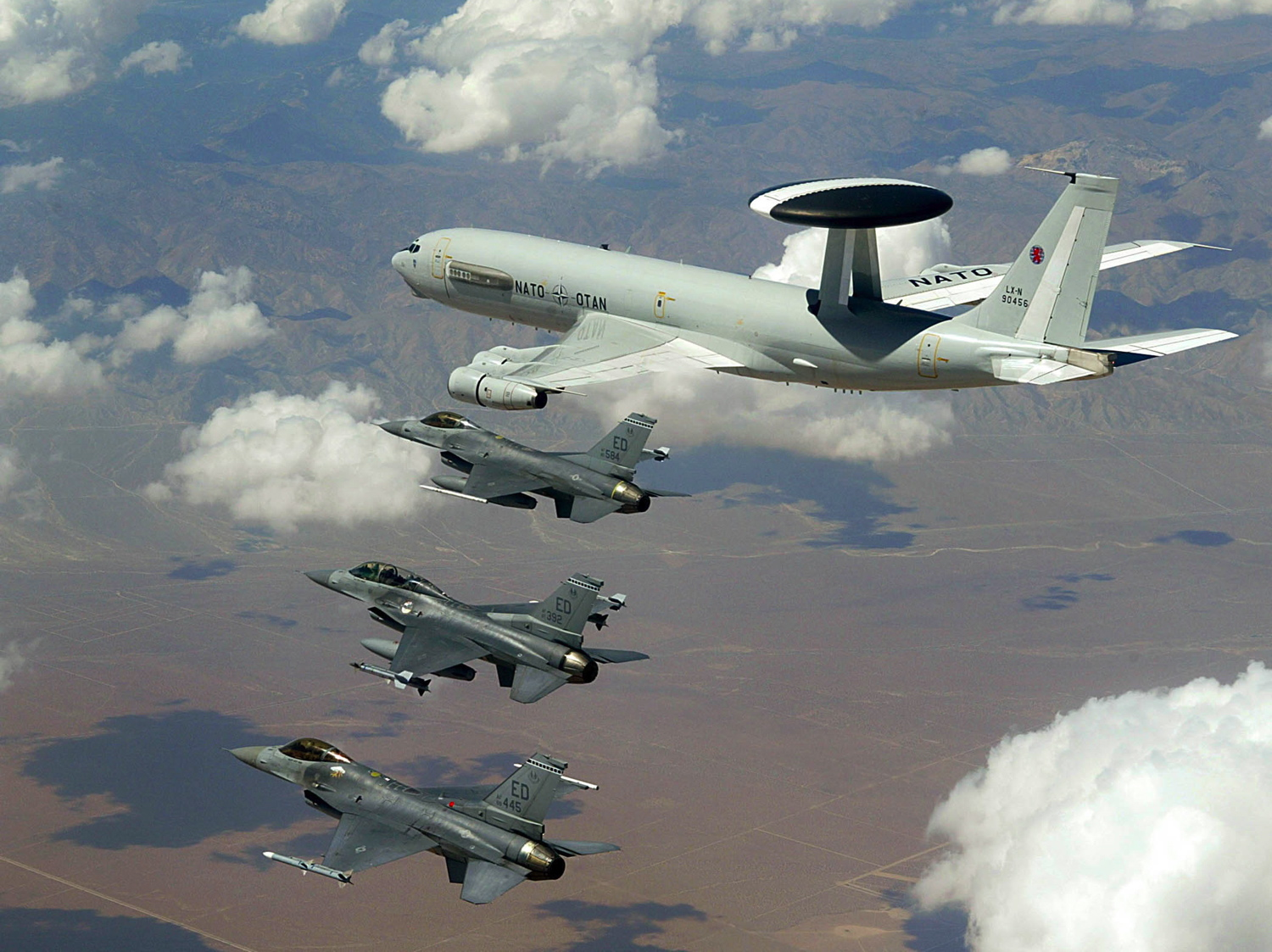
NATO E-3A flying with United States Air Force F-16 Fighting Falcons in a NATO exercise.

From 1994 to 1999, ACE had three Major Subordinate Commands, AFNORTHWEST, AFCENT, and AFSOUTH. In 1995 NATO began a Long Term Study to examine post-Cold War strategy and structure. Recommendations from the study for a new, streamlined structure emerged in 1996. The European and Atlantic commands were to be retained, but the number of major commands in Europe was to be cut from three to two, Regional Command North Europe and Regional Command South Europe. Activation of the new RC SOUTH occurred in September 1999, and in March 2000 Headquarters AFNORTHWEST closed and the new RC NORTH was activated. The headquarters of the two Regional Commands were known as Regional Headquarters South (RHQ South) and RHQ NORTH respectively. Each was to supervise air, naval, and land commands for their region as well as a number of Joint Subregional Commands (JSRCs). Among the new JSRCs was Joint Headquarters Southwest, which was activated in Madrid in September 1999.

=== Organizations and agencies ===
Prior to the reorganization, the NATO website listed 43 different agencies and organizations and five project committees/offices as of 15 May 2008. including:

- Logistics committees, organizations and agencies, including:
  - NATO Maintenance and Supply Agency
  - Central Europe Pipeline System
  - NATO Pipeline System
- Production Logistics organizations, agencies, and offices including the NATO Eurofighter and Tornado Management Agency
- Standardisation organization, committee, office, and agency including the NATO Standardization Agency which also plays an important role in the global arena of standards determination.
- Civil Emergency Planning committees and center
- Air Traffic Management and Air Defence committees, working groups organization and center including the:
  - NATO ACCS Management Agency (NACMA), based in Brussels, manages around a hundred persons in charge of the Air Control and Command System (ACCS) due for 2009.
  - NATO Programming Centre
- The NATO Airborne Early Warning and Control Programme Management Organisation (NAPMO)
- NATO Consultation, Command and Control Organisation (NC3O)
  - NATO Consultation, Command and Control Agency (NC3A), reporting to the NATO Consultation, Command and Control Organization (NC3O). This agency was formed when the SHAPE Technical Centre (STC) in The Hague (Netherlands) merged in 1996 with the NATO Communications and Information Systems Operating and Support Agency (NACISA) based in Brussels (Belgium). The agency comprises around 650 staff, of which around 400 are located in The Hague and 250 in Brussels.
  - NATO Communications and Information Systems Services Agency (NCSA), based in Mons (BEL), was established in August 2004 from the former NATO Communications and Information Systems Operating and Support Agency (NACISA).
  - NATO Headquarters C3 Staff (NHQC3S), which supports the North Atlantic Council, Military Committee, International Staff, and the International Military Staff.
- NATO Electronic Warfare Advisory Committee (NEWAC)
- Military Committee Meteorological Group (MCMG)
- The Military Oceanography Group (MILOC)
- NATO Research and Technology Organisation (RTO),
- Education and Training college, schools and group
- Project Steering Committees and Project Offices, including:
  - Alliance Ground Surveillance Capability Provisional Project Office (AGS/PPO)
  - Battlefield Information Collection and Exploitation System (BICES)
  - NATO Continuous Acquisition and Life-Cycle Support Office (CALS)
  - NATO FORACS Office
  - Munitions Safety Information Analysis Center (MSIAC)
- Committee of Chiefs of Military Medical Services in NATO (COMEDS)
- Defence Innovation Accelerator for the North Atlantic (DIANA)

== See also ==
- Pactomania
- Enlargement of NATO
- Foreign policy of the Harry S. Truman administration#NATO
- History of the Common Security and Defence Policy, of the European Union
- NATO open door policy
- Able Archer 83
- Warsaw Pact, the Soviet opposition
- Relations between France and NATO
- Russia–NATO relations
- Ukraine–NATO relations

== General bibliography ==
- Isby, David C.; Kamps, Charles Jr. (1985). Armies of NATO's Central Front. Jane's Information Group. ISBN 978-0-7106-0341-8.
- Garthoff, Raymond L. (1994). Détente and confrontation: American-Soviet relations from Nixon to Reagan. Brookings Institution Press. ISBN 978-0-8157-3041-5.
- Gorbachev, Mikhail (1996). Memoirs. London: Doubleday. ISBN 978-0-385-40668-0.
- National Defense University (1997). Allied command structures in the new NATO. DIANE Publishing. ISBN 978-1-57906-033-6.
- Kaplan, Lawrence S. (2004). NATO Divided, NATO United: The Evolution of an Alliance. Greenwood Publishing Group. ISBN 978-0-275-98006-1.
- Njølstad, Olav (2004). The last decade of the Cold War: from conflict escalation to conflict transformation. Vol. 5. Psychology Press. ISBN 978-0-7146-8539-7.
- Osgood, Robert E. (1962). NATO: The Entangling Alliance. University of Chicago Press. ISBN 9780226637822.
- Park, William (1986). Defending the West: a history of NATO. Westview Press. ISBN 978-0-8133-0408-3.
- Pedaliu, Effie G. H. (2003). Britain, Italy, and the Origins of the Cold War. Palgrave Macmillan. ISBN 0-333-97380-1.
- Reynolds, David (1994). The Origins of the Cold War in Europe: International Perspectives. Yale University Press. ISBN 978-0-300-10562-9.
- Schoenbaum, Thomas J. (1988). Waging Peace and War: Dean Rusk in the Truman, Kennedy, and Johnson Years. Ann Arbor, Michigan: Simon & Schuster. ISBN 978-0-671-60351-9.
- van der Eyden, Ton (2003). Public management of society: rediscovering French institutional engineering in the European context. Vol. 1. IOS Press. ISBN 978-1-58603-291-3.
- Wenger, Andreas; Nuenlist, Christian; Locher, Anna (2007). Transforming NATO in the Cold War: Challenges beyond deterrence in the 1960s. Taylor & Francis. ISBN 978-0-415-39737-7.
- Willbanks, James H. (2004). Machine Guns: An Illustrated History of Their Impact. ABC-CLIO. ISBN 1-8510-9480-6.
