= 2004 Istanbul NATO summit =

2004 NATO summit meeting in Istanbul, Turkey

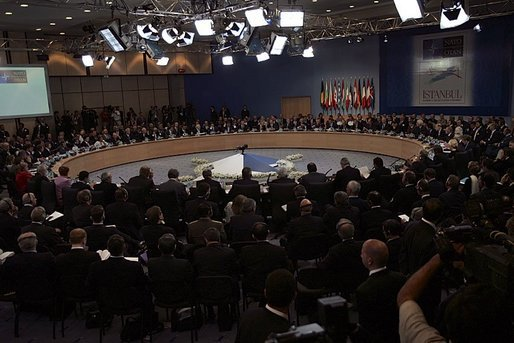
- Host country: Turkey
- Date: 28–29 June 2004
- Cities: Istanbul
- Venues: Istanbul Lütfi Kırdar International Convention and Exhibition Center
- Follows: 2002 Prague NATO summit
- Precedes: 2005 Brussels NATO summit
- Website: www.nato.int/docu/comm/2004/06-istanbul/home.htm

The 2004 Istanbul summit was held in Istanbul, Turkey from 28 to 29 June 2004. It was the 19th NATO summit in which NATO's Heads of State and Governments met to make formal decisions about security topics. In general, the summit is seen as a continuation of the transformation process that began in the 2002 Prague summit, which hoped to create a shift from a Cold War alliance against Soviet aggression to a 21st-century coalition against new and out-of-area security threats. The summit consisted of four meetings.

NATO members welcomed seven new alliance members during the North Atlantic Council meeting, decided to expand the alliance's presence in the War in Afghanistan and to end its presence in Bosnia, agreed to assist Iraq with training, launched a new partnership initiative and adopted measures to improve NATO's operational capabilities.

The NATO-Russia Council meeting was mostly noted by the absence of both Russian president Vladimir Putin and of any progress concerning the ratification of the adapted CFE treaty or the withdrawal of Russian troops from Georgia and Moldova. NATO leaders further welcomed progress made by Ukraine towards membership in the NATO-Ukraine Commission meeting and discussed some general and mostly symbolic topics with its non-NATO counterparts during the Euro-Atlantic Partnership Council meeting.

Due to Turkish government fears of a terrorist attack, security measures during the summit were tight. Demonstrators from around the world gathered to protest against NATO or the American foreign policy under the George W. Bush administration, while the summit itself was blown off the front pages of the world press by the unexpected transfer of Iraqi sovereignty, coinciding with the first day of the NATO summit on 28 June.

== Security measures ==
Unprecedented security measures were made by the Turkish government to safeguard the NATO summit from terrorist attacks. They especially feared a repetition of the Istanbul bombings of 2003 that killed more than 60 people. Their fear was proven by the arrest of 16 people in Bursa in early May on suspicion of planning to bomb the summit. Police seized guns, explosives, bomb-making booklets and 4,000 compact discs with training advice from Osama bin Laden, and believed that the suspects were members of the radical Islamic group Ansar al-Islam, thought to be linked with al-Qaeda. On 24 June two bombs also exploded. One bomb went off in a bus in Istanbul killing 4 people (including the bomber), the other outside a hotel in Ankara where US president George W. Bush would be staying. Additionally, on 25 June, explosives were found in a parked car at Istanbul's main airport.

Security measures included Turkish war ships and Turkish commandos in rubber boats patrolling the Bosporus, AWACS surveillance planes and F-16 warplanes circling above the city to monitor a no-fly zone over the city, and the assignment of 23,000 to 24,000 police officers, supported by police helicopters and armoured vehicles. The Bosphorus Strait was also closed to oil tankers, the underground rail system was suspended and whole city districts were sealed off. Nevertheless, a small bomb or explosive devise blew up on an empty Turkish Airlines plane on 29 June as workers were cleaning it at the main Istanbul airport. Three of the workers were slightly injured.

The extent of disruption caused by the security measures was criticized by several Turkish newspapers. The newspaper Cumhuriyet for instance called the situation "a total disgrace" and commented that Istanbul and Ankara looked like "ghost cities for a couple of days, imprisoning the people, emptying the streets and stopping boats from leaving." The newspaper further added that people died because emergency services were unable to reach them.

== Demonstrations ==
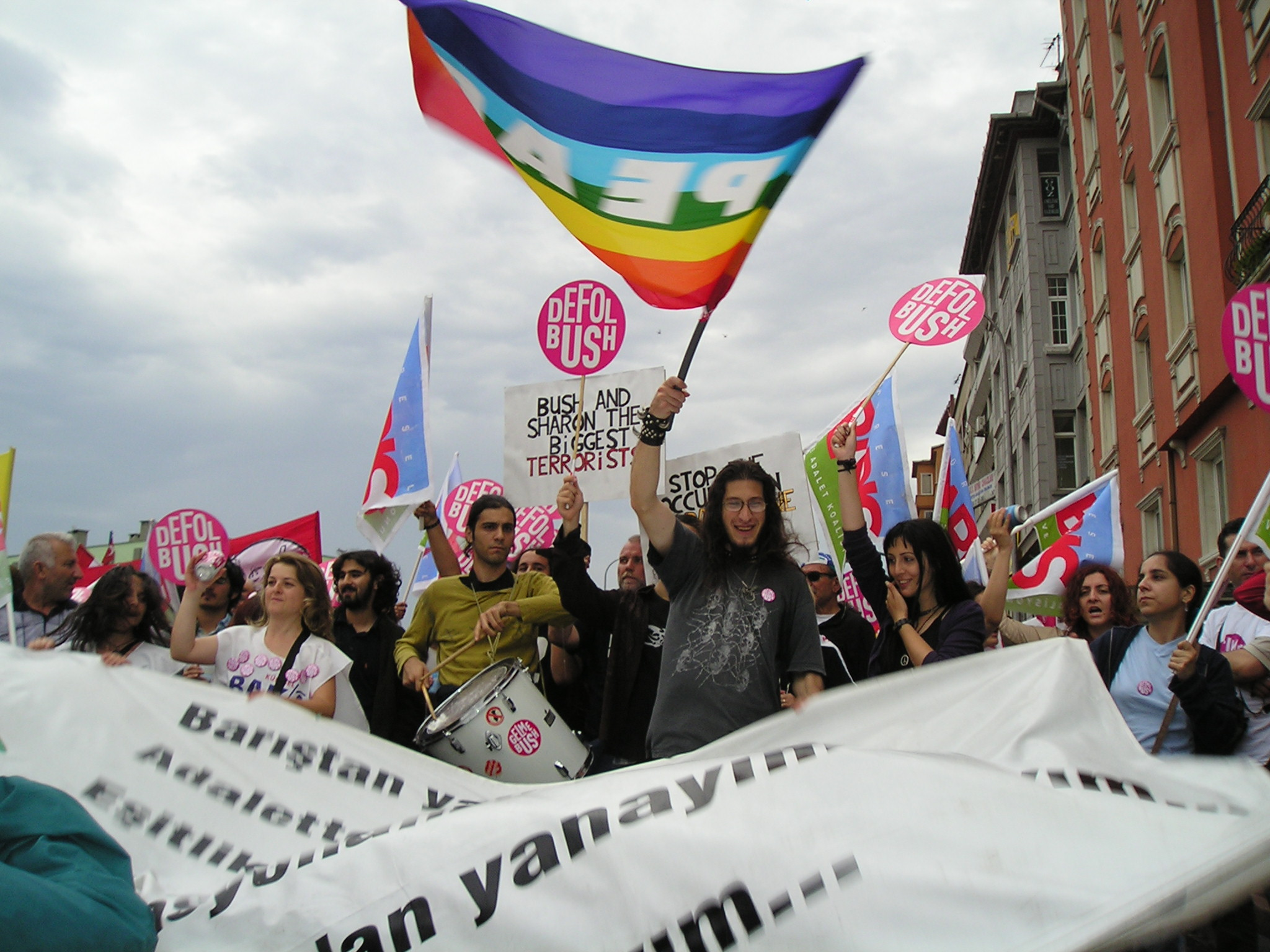
Demonstrators protest against the summit in Istanbul.

During June, there was a surge in demonstrations against the upcoming NATO summit, resulting in almost daily protests in Turkey. For instance on 16 June, Turkish riot police detained some 40 people during a demonstration and on 21 June, police used water cannon, tear gas and armoured vehicles to disperse activists who barricaded streets and threw petrol bombs. Throughout June, anti-NATO protestors from around the world gathered at Istanbul to demonstrate.

Protests included opposition to US foreign policy (especially opposition against the US-led Afghanistan War and the Iraq War), opposition to NATO's presence in the Balkans, opposition against NATO itself or against a new role for NATO, opposition against the continuing existence of nuclear weapons, and claims the USA abused NATO to support its policies in Iraq, the wider Middle East, and Afghanistan.

A day before the summit, US president George W. Bush traveled to Ankara, the capital of Turkey for advance meetings with Turkish leaders. Then and during the summit demonstrations became larger and tens of thousands of Turks demonstrated in the streets of Istanbul. On 28 June, demonstrators tried to disrupt the NATO meeting by staging several simultaneous mass demonstrations around the city. Riot police sprayed tear gas at anti-NATO demonstrators as protesters and police clashed in running street battles. At least 30 people, including five police officers, were injured when anti-NATO protesters throwing stones and petrol bombs clashed with riot police. Some 20 persons were detained in these protests. The police broke up a smaller crowd, detaining at least six persons, in the Mecidiyeköy area when they tried to march towards the summit about 3 km to the south. In a separate protest, Greenpeace activists, dangling from a bridge over the Bosphorus Strait, unfurled a 30-meter banner showing a dove of peace with a nuclear missile in its beak and the phrase "Nukes out of NATO".

== Summit meetings ==
June 2004 was arguably one of the most intense months of summitry in the history of transatlantic relations. The NATO summit followed on the D-Day's 60th anniversary celebrations in Normandy (France) on 6 June; on the 30th G8 summit from 8 June until 10 June in Georgia (United States); and on the meetings with EU leaders in Dublin (Ireland) on 24 June.

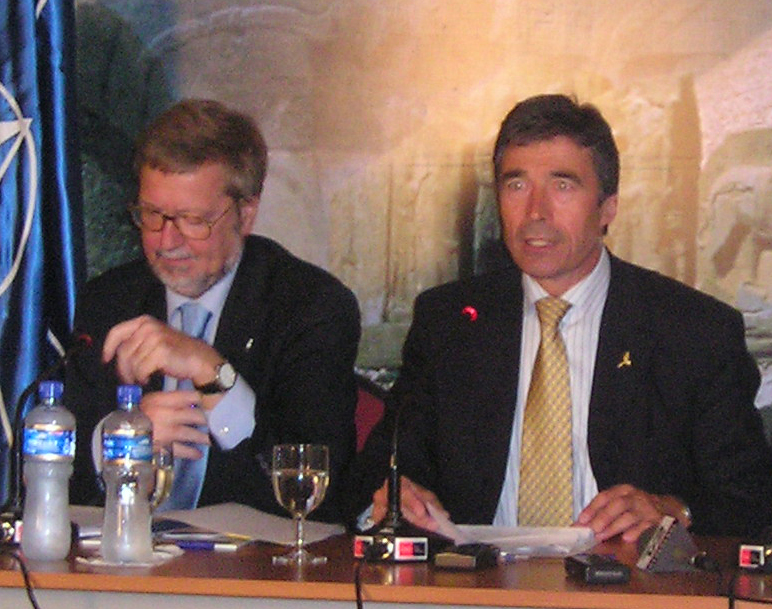
Danish foreign minister Per Stig Møller (left) and Danish prime minister Anders Fogh Rasmussen (right) at the summit.

The 2004 Istanbul summit consisted of four main meetings, all held in the Istanbul Lütfi Kırdar Convention and Exhibition Center: the North Atlantic Council (NATO's highest decision-making body, attended by heads of state and government from each of the 26 Alliance member countries); the NATO-Russia Council (which met only at the level of foreign ministers, since Russian president Vladimir Putin stayed away, reflecting ongoing tension between NATO and Russia over NATO enlargement and the Adapted Conventional Armed Forces in Europe Treaty); the NATO-Ukraine Commission; and the Euro-Atlantic Partnership Council (46 countries including many former Eastern bloc and former Soviet states).

Besides these meetings, several visits and question sessions were made on 26 and 27 June, and several press conferences by heads of government of state or government were made after or in between the above-mentioned meetings. Once the North Atlantic Council meeting on 28 June was concluded, a statement called the "Istanbul Declaration: Our security in a new era" was issued. In this statement the leaders summarized the main conclusions of the discussions.

Almost forgotten in coverage of the summit was that six new members from the former Warsaw Pact – Lithuania, Latvia, Estonia, Slovakia, Bulgaria and Romania – plus Slovenia, joined NATO in March 2004 and were formally welcomed into the Alliance.

=== North Atlantic Council meeting (28 June) ===
==== Missions ====
===== Expanded presence in Afghanistan =====
Several days before the summit, NATO Secretary General Jaap de Hoop Scheffer described Afghanistan as "priority number one". During the summit, NATO members officially agreed that the NATO-led International Security Assistance Force (ISAF) would take on command of four additional Provincial Reconstruction Teams (PRTs) (one in Mazar-e-Sharif, Meymana, Feyzabad and Baghlan), falling short of the initial target of five. Until then ISAF only provided security in around the capital city Kabul and commanded one PRT in Kunduz. The 26 members agreed to contribute between them an additional 600 troops (23.08 per country) and three helicopters to the Afghan mission. The three helicopters came from Turkey, and had gone back within three months. NATO also vowed to beef up its Afghanistan peace force from 6,500 to 10,000 to help make the 2004 Afghan presidential election secure, but no actual agreement for that many additional troops was made.

===== End of the SFOR mission =====
NATO members agreed to end the NATO-led Stabilisation Force (SFOR) in Bosnia and Herzegovina, which began its mission in 1996. NATO stressed that it would maintain a presence in the country to assist in certain areas such as defence reform, or the pursuit of persons indicted for war crimes. Heads of State and Government also welcomed a decision by the European Union to establish a follow-on mission, which would take over the 7,500-member mission and which will be supported by NATO under existing NATO-EU agreements.

==== Middle East ====
The summit marked a shift in Alliance priorities towards greater involvement in the Middle East, a strategically important region, whose security and stability was regarded as closely linked to the Euro-Atlantic security. The existing Mediterranean Dialogue (MD) cooperation was broadened, and two new major engagements were launched: the Istanbul Cooperation Initiative (ICI) and a training mission for Iraqi troops.

===== Iraq troop training =====
The summit was dominated by divisions over the Iraq War as NATO members were only able to agree to limited assistance in the form of training for Iraqi security forces. The NATO support given to Iraq troop training was in response to a request by the Iraqi Interim Government, and in accordance with United Nations Security Council Resolution 1546, which requests international and regional organisations to contribute assistance to the multinational force. Even this limited agreement contained areas of contention, with France insisting that it would only help with training outside Iraq, while the United States favored that the training would take place inside Iraq. As a consequence, the deal was left deliberately vague and differences remained on whether NATO should train Iraqi officers inside Iraq, or limit itself to training outside the country and acting as a clearing house for national efforts. The commitment was also vague as it was not made clear what the size of the training mission would be or exactly when and where it would take place. German chancellor Gerhard Schroeder, known for his earlier opposition to the Iraq War, commented: "The engagement of NATO is reduced to training and only training. We have made clear that we don't want to see German soldiers in Iraq." Despite outwardly optimistic statements by the US concerning NATO's commitment towards Iraqi troop training after the summit, France and Germany had refused to share the burden of responsibility for the situation in Iraq and did not support the US and British demand for sending NATO troops. Put differently, participation in the multinational forces in Iraq was left to the discretion of the particular alliance members and the USA relunctantly consented to troop training outside Iraq. Consequently, despite an outward show of NATO unity, the split over Iraq still persisted and tensions in interstate relations within the alliance were not resolved.

===== Improved Mediterranean Dialogue =====
NATO's leaders invited their Mediterranean Dialogue (MD) partners (Algeria, Egypt, Israel, Jordan, Mauritania, Morocco and Tunisia) to elevate the MD to a genuine partnership by establishing a more ambitious and expanded framework for cooperation. This cooperation would be guided by the principle of joint ownership and taking into consideration their particular interests and needs.

===== Istanbul Cooperation Initiative =====
NATO leaders also decided to launch the Istanbul Cooperation Initiative (ICI) with selected states in the Greater Middle East, thus exceeding a Mediterranean scope. The initiative was an offer to engage in practical security cooperation activities with these states and each interested country would be considered by the North Atlantic Council on a case-by-case basis and on its own merit. The words "country" and "countries" in the ICI document do not exclude participation of the Palestinian Authority, but such partnership would be—like any other partnership—subject to the North Atlantic Council's approval.

This initiative stands alongside NATO's Partnership for Peace Program and the Mediterranean Dialogue. NATO members regard these partnerships as a response to the new challenges of the 21st century and as a complement to the G8 and US-EU decisions to support calls for reform from within the Broader Middle East region. The ICI offers practical cooperation with interested nations in the Greater Middle East in such areas as: counter-WMD; counterterrorism; training and education; participation in NATO exercises; the promotion of military interoperability; disaster preparedness and civil emergency planning; tailored advice on defense reform and civil-military relations; and cooperation on border security to help prevent illicit trafficking of drugs, weapons, and people.

==== Plans ====
===== Plan to enhance operational capabilities =====
NATO leaders endorsed measures to improve NATO's ability to take on operations when and where necessary, committing themselves to be able at all times to deploy and sustain larger proportions of their forces on operations to ensure that NATO has a permanently available pool of assets and forces that can deployed. They also endorsed changes to NATO's defence planning, hoping that the Alliance's long-term defence planning process would become more flexible, thereby helping member countries generate forces that can reach further, faster and still take on the full range of missions.

===== Plan to enhance anti-terrorism efforts =====
NATO leaders hoped to boost the Alliance's anti-terrorism efforts with an agreement to improve intelligence sharing and to develop new, high-tech defences against terrorist attacks. NATO members committed themselves to improve intelligence sharing through a Terrorist Threat Intelligence Unit. This Unit, created after the September 11 attacks, became permanent and . Its function is to analyze general terrorist threats, as well as those that are more specifically aimed at NATO. NATO also pledged itself to stand ready to assist any member country in dealing with potential or real terrorist attacks. The Alliance's AWACS early warning radar aircraft and Chemical Biological Radiological and Nuclear Defence Battalion would be made available to any member that requests such assistance. Heads of State and Government also gave direction to develop a package of high-tech capabilities to protect civilians and forces from terrorist attacks.

=== NATO-Russia Council meeting (28 June) ===
==== Linkage between the CFE ratification and the OSCE obligations ====
Discussions with Russia on NATO concessions in return for Russian president Vladimir Putin's attendance had been underway for some months before the summit, and intensified as the summit date drew closer. On 17 May, in the run-up to the NATO summit, NATO Secretary-General Jaap de Hoop Scheffer indicated in a speech that Putin signalled that he might honor the summit with his presence if "the conditions will be right". It is unclear what conditions were under discussion, but it is speculated that Putin's conditions included an enhanced Russian role in NATO decision-making through the NATO-Russia Council (NRC), NATO acceptance of Russia's continued military presence in Moldova and Georgia (the withdrawal of these troops was an obligation Russia had assumed at the Organization for Security and Co-operation in Europe's (OSCE) 1999 Istanbul summit); a move of NATO members to ratify that same treaty and to place the three Baltic states, that joined NATO in March 2004, under military restrictions. As Putin did not receive satisfaction in discussions ahead of the NATO summit – at least not to the extent that he hoped, he refused to attend the meeting. When NATO officials indicated that Putin would probably not attend the summit, Russia's Foreign Affairs Minister Sergei Lavrov reacted on the same day (2 June) by stressing the importance that Moscow attaches to enhancing its role in NRC and that Russia had not declined the invitation to attend the NRC meeting. Due to the replacement of Putin by Lavrov, the meeting was not held at the level of the Heads of State and Government (as normally would be the case), but at the level of foreign ministers.

On 26 June, two days before the summit, US Under Secretary of State R. Nicholas Burns and US ambassador to Russia Alexander Vershbow wrote a joint newspaper article in which they commented that the relations between NATO and Russia were good and that NATO and Russia took "a little-noticed but enormous step in our maturing partnership", referring to "Exercise Kaliningrad 2004" which brought together some 1,000 personnel from 22 NATO member and partner countries for a terrorism response exercise. In practice, several rifts between Russia and NATO were visible and became increasingly more so during the summit. One rift existed about NATO's non-ratification of the adapted CFE treaty and Russia's non-fulfillment of its OSCE obligations (the withdrawal of Russian troops from Moldova and Georgia). Even before the summit commenced, the rift was visible as US Defense Secretary Donald Rumsfeld stopped, en route to Istanbul, in Moldova where he called for the withdrawal of Russian forces from the country. Another reason for tension was the accession of seven Eastern European states to NATO in March 2004 and NATO's increasing cooperation with other Eastern European and Caucasian states. On 27 June, Russia warned NATO to respect its security interests and expressed concern over NATO's stepped up activity in the Caucasus and Central Asia.

During the NRC meeting, NATO leaders and NATO's Secretary General made a clear linkage between their Adapted Conventional Armed Forces in Europe Treaty (adapted CFE treaty) ratification and the withdrawal of Russian troops from Moldova and Georgia, and took no notice of Russia's proposals for the earliest possible entry into force of the treaty and Russia's ratification on the eve of the summit. According to Russian foreign minister Sergey Lavrov these withdrawal demands were incorrect, because "the political understandings did not set any time limit for physical action". Put differently, Russia denied that it made clear commitments to withdraw its forces from Georgia and Moldova, a policy to which it adhered since 2002, and reaffirmed its policy of seeking bilateral agreement with Georgia on the status and functioning of Russian military bases in that country. In addition, Russia argued that it faced new threats on its southern borders: the possibility of missile launches from Iran and the expansion of Islamist terrorism, which required – in the perspective of Russia – Russian military presence in Georgia and Armenia. Colonel Anatoli Tesiganouk, Head of Russia's Military Forecasting Center, argued that NATO took no notice of Russia's position because NATO's leaders still had the same mental stereotypes that took shape during the Cold War; that a large part of the Western elite still regarded Russia as a kind of USSR, ignoring the fact that Russia has not only new borders, but also new aspirations, new international partners, and new threats. These stereotypes could have wittingly or unwittingly affected the relations in the NATO-Russia Council.

==== Russia's Iraq and Afghanistan proposals ====
On Iraq, Lavrov proposed to hold a general conference with the participation of all Iraqi political forces (including all opposition forces and including the "armed resistance to the occupation") and Iraq's neighboring countries and the international community, including Russia. Regarding Afghanistan, Lavrov expressed the interest of Russia and other members of the Commonwealth of Independent States in suppressing terrorism and called for "establishing ties" and "developing cooperation" between NATO and the Collective Security Treaty Organization (CSTO). Both proposals received at most a lukewarm response by NATO leaders.

=== NATO-Ukraine Commission meeting (29 June) ===
This meeting was between NATO leaders and president of Ukraine Leonid Kuchma. NATO members expressed appreciation for Ukraine's contributions to NATO-led and other international peace support efforts such as KFOR. Ukraine also offered to support Operation Active Endeavour in the Mediterranean (a naval operation of NATO which is designed to prevent the movement of terrorists or weapons of mass destruction), an offer which NATO would consider. Defence cooperation between NATO and Ukraine was reviewed and the possible launching of a Partnership for Peace Trust Fund to help Ukraine destroy the surplus munitions, small arms and light weapons was discussed.

NATO further welcomed Ukraine's desire to achieve full integration into NATO, but stressed that this would require more than troop contributions and defence reform. This would require showing commitment to the values that underpin the Alliance (democracy, rule of law, freedom of speech and media, and fair elections) as was foreseen in the NATO-Ukraine Action Plan, which was adopted during the 2002 Prague Summit. In particular NATO Secretary General de Hoop Scheffer criticized Kuchma's record on freedom of press and preparations for the Ukrainian presidential election of November 2004.

=== Euro-Atlantic Partnership Council meeting (29 June) ===
This meeting was mostly symbolic and did not have any concrete proposals or results. Nevertheless, some policies or earlier decisions were reaffirmed or emphasized. First of all, the Euro-Atlantic Partnership Council (EAPC) Heads of State and Government met with President Hamid Karzai of the Transitional Islamic State of Afghanistan and discussed the progress in that country, and recognized the valuable role played by both Allies and Partners who make up the ISAF, but also emphasized that much remains to be done for Afghanistan to become a peaceful and stable country, fully integrated into the international community. Secondly, the commitment of the Euro-Atlantic community to peace, security and stability in the Balkans was reaffirmed. Further, the presence of the Heads of State of Bosnia and Herzegovina and Serbia and Montenegro at their meeting as observers was welcomed, and these leaders were urged them to meet the outstanding conditions set for Partnership for Peace membership by Allies. Thirdly, the resolve to fight terrorism was reaffirmed and some initiatives aimed at increasing the EAPC's contribution in this fight were taken, thereby endorsing the further implementation of the Partnership Action Plan against Terrorism.

Fourthly, support for a major report on the future development of the Euro-Atlantic Partnership, which outlines the core objectives of Partnership (political dialogue and practical co-operation, the promotion of democratic values across the Euro-Atlantic area, preparing interested Partners for participation in NATO-led operations and support Partners who wish to join the Alliance). Fifthly, the commitment to building a Partnership which would be tailored to the different needs of individual Partners was reaffirmed. In this respect, NATO's intention to place a special focus on relations with the states of the Caucasus and Central Asia was welcomed, including the decision by the Alliance to appoint one liaison officer for each region. They also welcomed the launching of the Individual Partnership Action Plan process by several states of these two regions. Sixthly, NATO's Policy on Combating Trafficking in Human Beings, which was developed in consultation with the EAPC partners, was endorsed.

The absence of Armenian president Robert Kocharyan drew some media attention. Kocharyan refused to join the summit to draw the alliance's attention to problems in relations between the Turkey and Armenia, in particular Turkey's refusal to consider the deaths of almost one million Armenians during World War I a genocide.

== Announcement of the transfer of Iraqi sovereignty ==
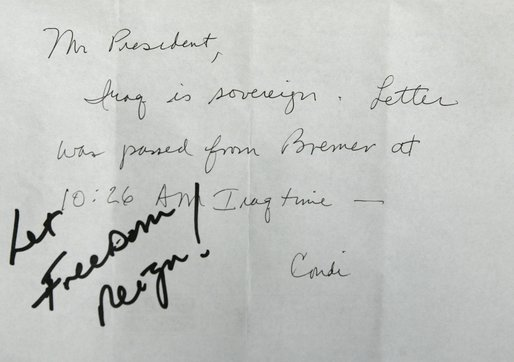
President Bush wrote "Let freedom reign!" on Rice's note about the handover of power to the Iraqi government.

While the transfer of Iraqi sovereignty was not decided during the summit, this transfer had some connections to the summit. First of all, the news of the unexpected transfer was made public during the summit. BBC News reports that Iraq's foreign minister Hoshyar Zebari, speaking after a breakfast meeting with Blair in Istanbul on 28 June, "slipped" prematurely that the handover of sovereignty to his country was being brought forward to coincide with the meeting. Later that day, US National Security advisor Condoleezza Rice gave US president Bush during the summit the following note: "Mr. President, Iraq is sovereign. Letter was passed from [Paul] Bremer at 10:26 am Iraq time – Condi". Bush scribbled in the margin of this note: "Let freedom reign!". Bush then turned to British prime minister Tony Blair, seated next to him, whispered that the handover had happened, and the two men shook hands. Later that day, Bush and Blair held a joint press conference, in which they welcomed the transfer. Secondly, the news of the handover pushed the summit from the front pages.

== Reviews ==
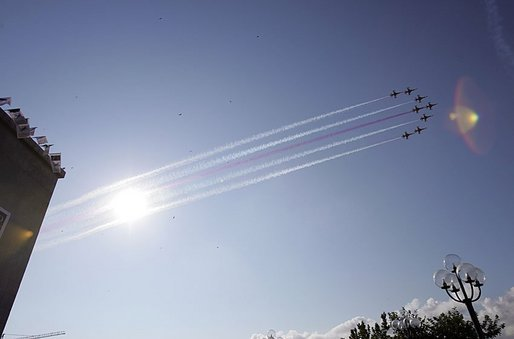
Honoring the start of the 2-day NATO summit in Istanbul, fighter jets fly in formation over the summit site.

The international media reported that expectations for a successful summit were deliberately set low, because NATO leaders wanted to avoid a flare-up over the Iraq War. Therefore, they agreed to meet the modest goals the Alliance had already set for itself in trying to stabilize Afghanistan, and endorsed a tepid version of the Bush administration's initiative to promote modernization and democracy in the Arab world. The newspaper further commented that the summit had "a sort of "Waiting for Godot" quality about it – European leaders biding time, neither creating a crisis nor mending fences, in the hope that the American election in November will somehow spare them from the choice between having to deal with Bush and letting Iraq, and NATO, slide into further disarray." Other analysis were even more critical: "There have been NATO summits at which neither a special occasion was acknowledged nor decisions of particular relevance made. One example is the NATO summit in Istanbul in 2004, where the concluded measures hardly required a meeting of the heads of state and government, and the media presence was not justified by the agreed-upon resolutions." US and other government officials however emphasized that the summit was significant in terms of the alliance's unprecedented outreach beyond its traditional North Atlantic focus and its aggressive emphasis on force planning to tackle new challenges worldwide.

Whether or not the summit is considered important for its content, the meeting held some symbolic importance. First of all, it was the first NATO summit between the leaders of the North-American and Western European states, and Eastern European states, states that were finally, after decades of Cold War tensions, together in the same alliance. The media attention that these new members received during the summit, opened public debates about whether there was still a consensus about the purpose, the perceived threats and the future borders of NATO among its 26 members. That this was not the case, became clear in the run-up to the 2006 Riga Summit. Secondly, the holding of the summit in Istanbul made it the most eastern summit in NATO's history. It marked the increasingly key role played by Turkey as a major strategic hub due to its location close to the hotbeds of tension and conflict in the South Caucasus and the Middle East. The location of the summit made clear that NATO's security concerns had shifted towards the southeastern part of the European continent. By shifting eastwards, the Alliance's centre of gravity ventured into very different areas from those on which the Cold War military NATO had focused.

NATO's 2004 Istanbul summit was also remarkably silent on the subject of nuclear weapons policy and non-proliferation, as opposed to pre-summit diplomacy and earlier post-Cold War NATO summits and contrary to the demonstrations going on in Istanbul. In June 2004, shortly before the summit, NATO issued two fact sheets on nuclear policy, portraying the developments within NATO in a favourable light in the run up to the 2005 Nuclear Non-Proliferation Treaty Review Conference. In practice, no real changes since the end of the Cold War were implemented, as since the 1994 US Nuclear posture review the number of US nuclear weapons based in Europe remained unchanged, and as Cold War nuclear sharing arrangements dating back to the 1960s remained in force. Additionally, no changes were made to Alliance nuclear policy since the 1999 Strategic Concept.

== See also ==
- List of NATO summits
- Turkey in NATO
- 2026 Ankara NATO summit
