= Istanbul Cooperation Initiative =

NATO initiative in West Asia

Member states of the ICI.

The Istanbul Cooperation Initiative (ICI) is a NATO initiative that was launched during the organisation's 2004 Istanbul summit.

During the summit, NATO leaders decided to elevate NATO's Mediterranean Dialogue to a genuine partnership and to launch the ICI with selected countries in West Asia. The initiative is an offer to engage in practical security cooperation activities with states throughout West Asia.

This new initiative stands alongside NATO's Partnership for Peace Program and the Mediterranean Dialogue. NATO itself regards these security cooperation partnerships as a response to the new challenges of the 21st century and as a complement to the G7 and U.S.-EU decisions to support calls for reform from within West Asia region. The ICI offers practical cooperation with interested nations in West Asia in such areas as:

- Counter-WMD;
- Counterterrorism;
- Training and education;
- Participation in NATO exercises;
- Promoting military interoperability;
- Disaster preparedness and civil emergency planning;
- Tailored advice on defense reform and civil-military relations; and
- Cooperation on border security to help prevent illicit trafficking of drugs, weapons, and people.

== Members ==
- Bahrain
- Qatar
- Kuwait
- United Arab Emirates
