= Mediterranean Dialogue =

NATO forum with Mediterranean countries

The Mediterranean Dialogue, first launched in 1994, is a forum of cooperation between NATO, five countries of the Mediterranean, Jordan and Mauritania. Its stated aim is "to create good relations and better mutual understanding and confidence throughout the region, promoting regional security and stability and explaining NATO's policies and goals."

The Dialogue reflects NATO's view that security in Europe is tied to the security and stability in the Mediterranean. It also reinforces and complements the Euro-Mediterranean Partnership and the Organization for Security and Co-operation in Europe's Mediterranean Initiative.

== Members ==
NATO member states Membership Action Plan Enhanced Opportunities Partner Individual Partnership Action Plan Partnership for Peace countries Mediterranean Dialogue countries Istanbul Cooperation Initiative (ICI) Partners across the globe

The Mediterranean Dialogue initially started with five countries but has added two more over time.

=== Initial members ===
- Egypt (joined in February 1995)
- Israel (joined in February 1995)
- Mauritania (joined in February 1995)
- Morocco (joined in February 1995)
- Tunisia (joined in February 1995)

=== Subsequent members ===
- Jordan (joined in November 1995)
- Algeria (joined in March 2000)

=== Potential expansion ===
In the 2012 Chicago Summit, NATO heads of states issued a declaration, citing Libya was "welcome" as a NATO partner "if it so wishes", through Mediterranean Dialogue. Libya has yet to respond.

== Individual Cooperation Programme (ICP) ==
On October 16, 2006, NATO and Israel finalized the first-ever Individual Cooperation Programme (ICP) under the enhanced Mediterranean Dialogue, where Israel will be contributing to the NATO maritime Operation Active Endeavour. The ICP covers many areas of common interest, such as the fight against terrorism and joint military exercises in the Mediterranean Sea. More ICP agreements were signed with Egypt (2007) and Jordan (2009), and NATO expects further agreements to be signed with additional Mediterranean Dialogue member states in the future.

== See also ==
- Individual Partnership Action Plan
- Istanbul Cooperation Initiative
- North Atlantic Council
- Partnership for Peace
- Union for the Mediterranean
