= NATO Parliamentary Assembly =

Consultative interparliamentary organisation

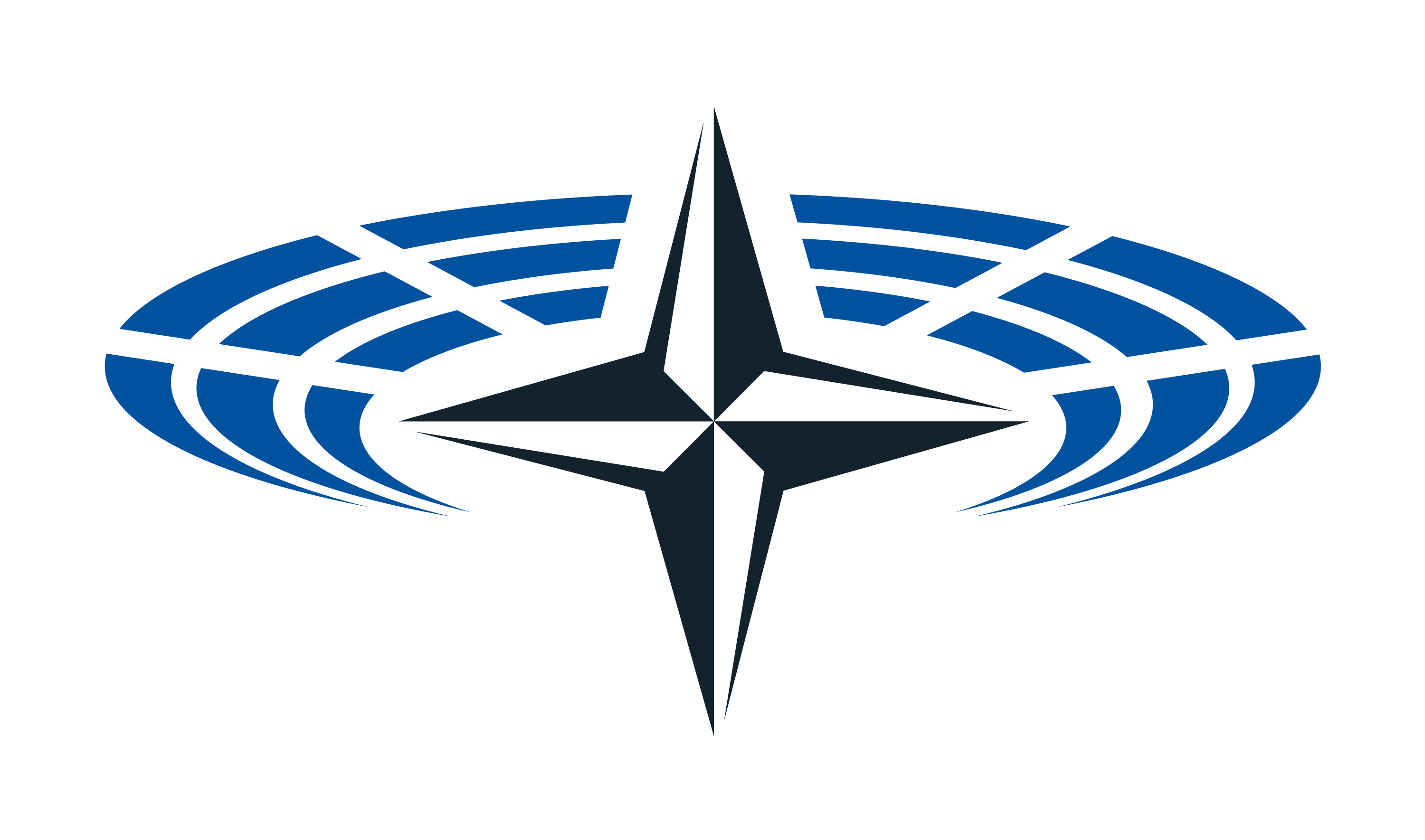
- Abbreviation: NATO PA
- Formation: 1955
- Type: Inter-parliamentary institution
- Location: Brussels, Belgium
- President: Marcos Perestrello
- Vice Presidents: Julie Dzerowicz; Mikko Savola; Alec Shelbrooke; Ágnes Vadai; Fernando Gutiérrez
- Secretary General: Benedetta Berti
- Parent organization: NATO
- Website: www.nato-pa.int

The NATO Parliamentary Assembly serves as the consultative interparliamentary organisation for the North Atlantic Treaty Organization (NATO). It consists of delegates from the parliaments of the 32 NATO member countries as well as from associate and partner countries. Its current president is Marcos Perestrello from Portugal. Its current secretary general is Benedetta Berti who has been in this position since 13th October 2025.

== History ==
The idea to engage Alliance Parliamentarians in collective deliberations on the problems confronting the transatlantic partnership first emerged in the early 1950s and took shape with the creation of an annual conference of NATO parliamentarians in 1955. The Assembly's creation reflected a desire on the part of legislators to give substance to the premise of the Washington Treaty of 1949 (also known as the North Atlantic Treaty) that NATO was the practical expression of a fundamentally political transatlantic alliance of democracies.

The foundation for cooperation between NATO and the NATO-PA was strengthened in December 1967 when the North Atlantic Council (NAC) authorized the NATO Secretary General to study how to achieve closer cooperation between the two bodies. As a result of these deliberations over the following year, the NATO Secretary General, after consultation with the NAC, implemented several measures to enhance the working relationship between NATO and the Assembly. These measures included the Secretary General providing a response to all Assembly recommendations and resolutions adopted in its Plenary Sessions.

In response to the fall of the Berlin Wall at the end of the 1980s, the NATO-PA broadened its mandate by developing close relations with political leaders in Central and East European countries. Those ties, in turn, greatly facilitated the dialogue that NATO itself embarked upon with the region's governments.

On November 21, 2022, at Madrid in the midst of the 2022 Russian invasion of Ukraine, the Parliamentary Assembly recognized Russia as "terrorist state" and called for the creation of a special international tribunal. Tomáš Valášek, the head of the Slovak delegation, said that the "resolution names Russia the most direct threat to Euro-Atlantic security ... It states clearly that the state of Russia, under its current regime, is a terrorist one."

At the NATO PA meeting on May 27, 2024, in Sofia, Bulgaria, a resolution was passed by 24 of the 32 allied nations "to no longer accept restrictions on the use of Western weapons against legitimate targets on Russian territory".

== Role ==
Bringing together legislators from all the member states of the Atlantic Alliance, the NATO PA provides a link between NATO and the parliaments of its member nations.

At the same time, it facilitates parliamentary awareness and understanding of key security issues and contributes to a greater transparency of NATO policies. Crucially, it helps maintain and strengthen the transatlantic relationship, which underpins the Atlantic Alliance.

Since the end of the Cold War the Assembly has assumed a new role by integrating into its work parliamentarians from those countries in Central and Eastern Europe and beyond who seek a closer association with NATO. This integration has provided both political and practical assistance and has sought to contribute to the strengthening of parliamentary democracy throughout the Euro-Atlantic region, and complement and reinforce NATO's own programme of partnership and co-operation.

The Assembly was directly concerned with assisting in the process of ratification of the Protocols of Accession signed at the end of 1997, which culminated in the accession of the Czech Republic, Hungary and Poland to the Alliance in March 1999. It played the same role with respect to the ratification process leading to the accession of Bulgaria, Estonia, Latvia, Lithuania, Romania, Slovakia and Slovenia in March 2004 and has continued to play this role for all further accessions of new members.

== Functioning ==
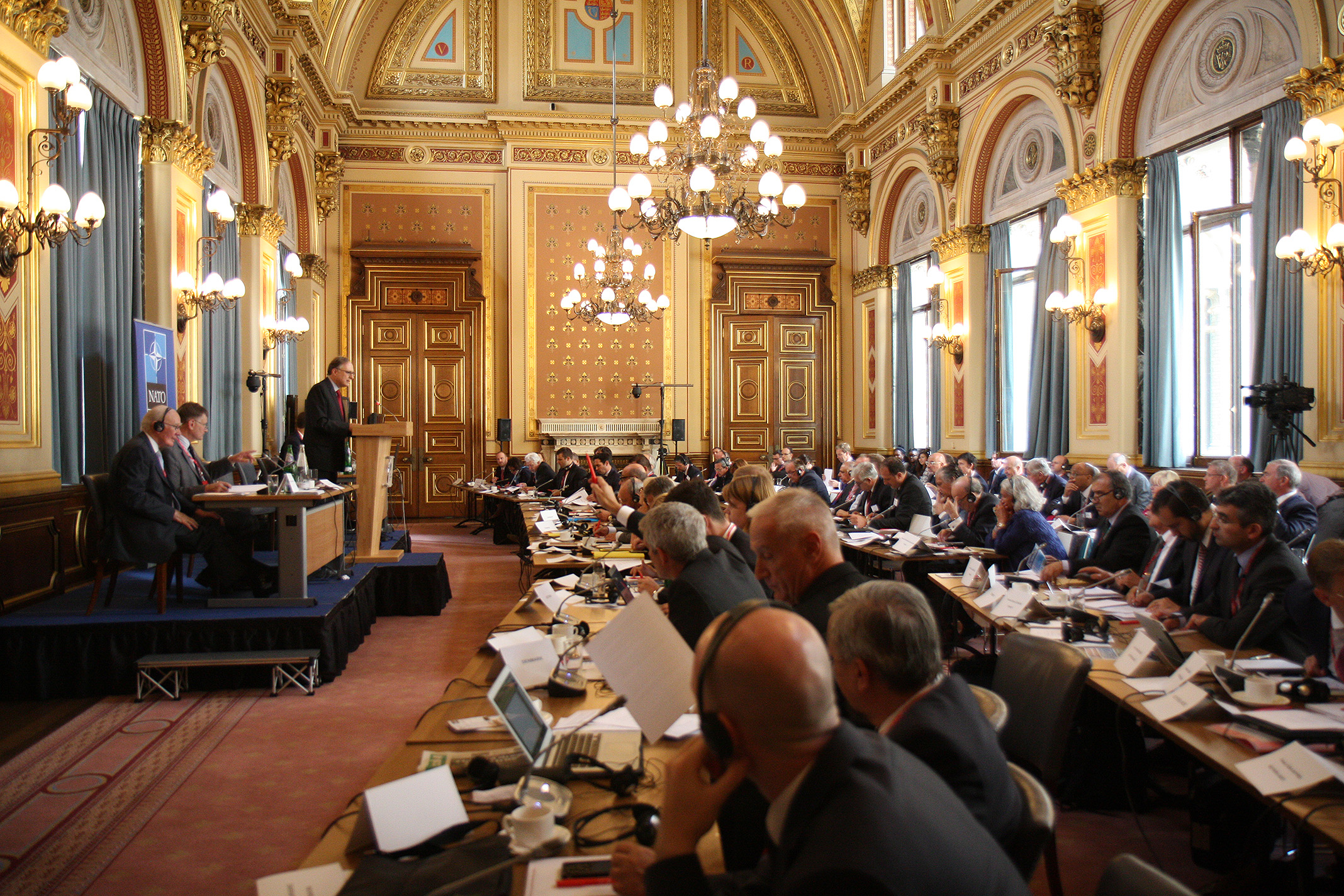
The Parliamentary Assembly meeting in London prior to the start of the 2014 Newport summit

The NATO PA consists of 274 delegates from the 32 NATO member countries. Delegates from 10 associate countries; the European Parliament; 4 regional partner and Mediterranean associate member countries; as well as parliamentary observers from 8 other parliaments; and 2 inter-parliamentary assemblies also take part in its activities.

Delegates to the assembly are nominated by their parliaments according to their national procedures, on the basis of party representation in the parliaments. The assembly therefore represents a broad spectrum of political opinion.

The assembly's governing body is the standing committee, which is composed of the head of each member delegation, the president, the vice-presidents, the treasurer and the secretary general.

The international secretariat, under its secretary general, is responsible for all administration and the bulk of research and analysis that supports the assembly's committees, sub-committees and other groups.

The headquarters of the assembly's 28-strong international secretariat is located in central Brussels.

=== Membership by participating state ===
The 274 delegates from the 32 member states are as follows; the final columns show the number of (non-voting) delegates from Associate Member states.

Member state	No. of Delegates
Albania	4
Belgium	7
Bulgaria	6
Canada	12
Croatia	5
Czechia	7
Denmark	5
Estonia	3
Finland	5
France	18
Germany	18

Member state	No. of Delegates
Greece	7
Hungary	7
Iceland	3
Italy	18
Latvia	3
Lithuania	4
Luxembourg	3
Montenegro	3
Netherlands	7
North Macedonia	3

Member state	No. of Delegates
Norway	5
Poland	12
Portugal	7
Romania	10
Slovakia	5
Slovenia	3
Spain	12
Sweden	5
Turkey	18
United Kingdom	18
United States	36

Associate Member (non-voting)	No. of Delegates
Armenia	3
Austria	5
Azerbaijan	5
Bosnia and Herzegovina	3
European Parliament	10
Georgia	4
Kosovo	3
Malta	3
Moldova	3
Serbia	5
Switzerland	5
Ukraine	12

Armenia, Austria, Azerbaijan, Bosnia and Herzegovina, Georgia, Moldova, Serbia, Switzerland and Ukraine have Associate status sending varying numbers of non-voting delegates to the assembly. Kosovo and Malta were given associate status in March 2024 by the Assembly's Standing Committee and Bosnia and Herzegovina, Georgia and Ukraine were designated NATO candidates. Additionally Algeria, Israel, Jordan, and Morocco have the status of Regional Partner and Mediterranean Associates each with 3 non-voting delegates. Finally, a number of other states; Australia, Egypt, Japan, Republic of Korea, Kazakhstan, Palestinian National Council, Tunisia and regional organizations; OSCE Parliamentary Assembly and the Parliamentary Assembly of the Council of Europe, have observer status at NATO Parliamentary Assembly sittings.

=== Financing ===
The assembly is directly funded by member parliaments and governments, and is financially and administratively separate from NATO itself. Each country's contribution is based on the NATO Civil Budget formula.

=== Committee structure ===
The five committees are: Democracy and Security; Defence and Security; Economics and Security; Political; Science and Technology. They are charged with examining all major contemporary issues in their fields.

The committees and sub-committees produce reports, which are discussed in draft form at the assembly's spring session. The reports are then revised and updated for discussion, amendment and adoption at the assembly's annual session in the autumn.

At the annual session, the committees also produce policy recommendations, which are voted on by the full assembly and forwarded to the North Atlantic Council and the NATO Secretary General and posted on the assembly's website. The NATO Secretary General responds in writing to the assembly's recommendations.

Members of the assembly's committees undertake regular visits and meetings where they receive briefings from leading government and parliamentary representatives, as well as senior academics and experts. NATO-PA delegations also undertake visits to NATO mission areas.

=== Other bodies ===
Other assembly bodies include the Mediterranean and Middle East Special Group to enhance parliamentary dialogue and understanding with countries of the Middle East and the North African region, the Ukraine-NATO Interparliamentary Council, and the NATO-Georgia Interparliamentary Council. The NATO-Russia Parliamentary Committee was discontinued in April 2014 following Russia's military intervention in Ukraine and illegal annexation of Crimea.

=== Rose-Roth Programme ===
The Rose-Roth Programme of partnership and co-operation is designed to extend assistance to countries undergoing transition through difficult political and economic reforms. The program was initially designed to support Central and Eastern European countries but has subsequently focused mainly on the Balkans and the South Caucasus.

Under this Programme, every year two to three Rose-Roth seminars are organized in a non-NATO country in partnership with the host nation parliament. These events, attended by members of parliament from member and partner states as well as independent experts, focus on regional and topical security issues. Along with additional training programmes for parliamentary staff and members of parliament, these events emphasize issues such as effective parliamentary oversight of defense and the military.

=== NATO Orientation Programme ===
The NATO Orientation programme is focused primarily on young or newly elected members of parliament from NATO and Euro-Atlantic Partnership Council (EAPC) nations, as well as those newly assigned to security or foreign affairs responsibilities. The programme aims at providing an in-depth overview of the functioning and policies of NATO and SHAPE as well as of the Alliance's evolving relationships with its many partners. The Programme was launched in 2000 and is held annually in Brussels.

=== Parliamentary Transatlantic Forum ===
In 2001, growing concern about the apparent drift in transatlantic attitudes, perceptions and policies, the assembly launched an annual "Parliamentary Transatlantic Forum" which brings together members of the assembly with senior US administration figures and academic experts. The forum is held annually in Washington DC in co-operation with the U.S. National Defense University and the Atlantic Council of the United States.

== Relations with NATO ==
There is no formal link between the NATO-PA and NATO although there is long history of cooperation that has intensified in the post–Cold War era.

The Assembly's Standing Committee meets annually with both the Secretary General and the Permanent Representatives to the North Atlantic Council at NATO Headquarters to exchange views on the state of the Alliance and to provide the perspectives of legislators. The Secretary General participates in the spring and autumn sessions of the Assembly as well as other special activities; he also provides a written response to the recommendations passed by the Assembly at its autumn session. The Assembly's Presidents, in turn, participate in Summit meetings of the Alliance.

Supreme Allied Commander Europe (SACEUR) and other senior military officials in the NATO chain of command also regularly meet with Assembly members in various formats.

== Relations with Ukraine, Georgia and Russia ==
Expanding on the relationship the Assembly had developed with parliaments in Russia and Ukraine at the end of the Cold War, the Founding Act on Mutual Relations, Cooperation and Security between the Russian Federation and NATO, signed in May 1997, and the NATO-Ukraine Charter signed in July 1997, explicitly charged the Assembly with expanding its dialogue and cooperation with both the Russian Federal Assembly and the Ukrainian Rada. Relations with the Russian Federal Parliament were reappraised entirely following Russia's illegal annexation of Crimea.

The Assembly also created a bilateral group with the Georgian Parliament in 2009 to support Georgia's integration into Euro-Atlantic structures.

Following the 2022 Russian invasion of Ukraine, the NATO PA recognised in November 2022, Russia as a terrorist state.

=== Ukraine-NATO Interparliamentary Council ===
In 2002, the Assembly also decided to upgrade its special relationship with Ukraine by creating the Ukraine-NATO Interparliamentary Council (UNIC). The Assembly's cooperation with the Verkhovna Rada was progressively strengthened in the run-up to the Ukrainian Presidential elections in 2004. Members of the NATO-PA were involved in election monitoring, supporting the international community's effort.

The Ukraine-NATO Interparliamentary Council (UNIC) monitors NATO's relationship with Ukraine, paying particular attention to the parliamentary aspects of Ukraine's defence and political reform. In addition to the UNIC meetings biannually held in both Brussels and Kyiv, there is usually one Committee or Sub-Committee visit to Kyiv each year. Meetings have continued, even after the 2022 Russian invasion of Ukraine.

=== Georgia-NATO Interparliamentary Council ===
In 2009, the Assembly approved the creation of a Georgia-NATO inter-parliamentary council. The Georgia-NATO Interparliamentary Council is composed of the Assembly's Bureau (President, Vice-Presidents and Treasurer) and the 4-member Georgian delegation to the NATO PA. The Group meets twice a year to discuss all aspects of Georgia-NATO cooperation and coordinate Assembly activities related to Georgia.

=== NATO-Russia Parliamentary Committee (2002–14) ===
Mirroring the creation in May 2002 of the NATO-Russia Council, a major step forward in NATO's cooperation with Russia, the Assembly created the NATO-Russia parliamentary Committee (NRPC). Until it was discontinued in April 2014, the NATO-Russia Parliamentary Committee met twice a year during each of the Assembly's sessions in an "at 29" format and had become the main framework for direct NATO-Russia parliamentary relations. It consisted of the leaders of the Assembly's 28 member delegations and the leaders of the Russian delegation to the Assembly. In addition to the dialogue held within this the Committee, a 10-person delegation of the Russian Federal Assembly participated in the Assembly's Plenary Sessions as well as in many Assembly Committee and Sub-Committee meetings and seminars. In April 2014, following the Russian occupation of Crimea, the NATO PA decided to withdraw the Russian Parliament's associate membership of the Assembly, thus effectively ending regular institutional relations with the Russian Parliament.

== Mediterranean and Middle East Special Group ==
In 1995, the Assembly created a Mediterranean Special Group with the aim of opening a political dialogue with legislators from countries of the Middle East and North Africa. The programme gradually expanded and the Assembly has now established relations at various levels with many parliaments across the Mediterranean, Northern and Central Africa, and the Middle East.

The Group meets three times a year either in NATO member countries or in the region. These meetings seek to enhance parliamentary awareness of the problems of the region, promote a political dialogue between parliamentarians, and share best practices among members of the respective parliaments.

== Presidents ==
President	In Office	Country
Wishart McLea Robertson	1955–1956	Canada
Wayne Hays	1956–1957	United States
Johannes Josephus Fens	1957–1959	Netherlands
Antoine Béthouart	1959–1960	France
Nils Langhelle	1960–1961	Norway
Pietro Micara	1961–1962	Italy
Thomas Dugdale, 1st Baron Crathorne	1962–1963	United Kingdom
Georg Kliesing	1963–1964	West Germany
Henri Moreau de Melen	1964–1965	Belgium
José Soares da Fonseca	1965–1966	Portugal
Jean-Eudes Dubé	1966–1967	Canada
Matthías Árni Mathiesen	1967–1968	Iceland
Kasım Gülek	1968–1969	Turkey
Wayne Hays	1969–1970	United States
Romain Fandel	1970–1971	Luxembourg
Terrence Murphy	1971–1972	Canada
John Peel	1972–1973'	United Kingdom
Knud Damgaard	1973–1975	Denmark
Wayne Hays	1975–1977	United States
Sir Geoffrey de Freitas	1977–1979	United Kingdom
Paul Thyness	1979–1980	Norway
Jack Brooks	1980–1982	United States
Peter Corterier	1982–1983	West Germany
Sir Patrick Wall	1983–1985	United Kingdom
Charles McCurdy Mathias Jr.	1985–1986	United States
Ton Frinking	1986–1988	Netherlands
Sir Patrick Duffy	1988–1990	United Kingdom
Charles Rose	1990–1992	United States
Loïc Bouvard	1992–1994	France
Karsten Voigt	1994–1996	Germany
William V. Roth Jr.	1996–1998	United States
Javier Rupérez	1998–2000	Spain
Rafael Estrella	2000–2002	Spain
Doug Bereuter	2002–2004	United States
Pierre Lellouche	2004–2006	France
Bert Koenders	2006–2007	Netherlands
José Lello	2007–2008	Portugal
John S. Tanner	2008–2010	United States
Karl A. Lamers	2010–2012	Germany
Sir Hugh Bayley	2012–2014	United Kingdom
Mike Turner	2014–2016	United States
Paolo Alli	2016–2018	Italy
Rasa Juknevičienė	2018	Lithuania
Madeleine Moon	2018–2019	United Kingdom
Attila Mesterházy	2019–2020	Hungary
Gerry Connolly	2020–2022	United States
Joëlle Garriaud-Maylam	2022–2023	France
Michał Szczerba	2023–2024	Poland
Gerry Connolly; Acting	2024	United States
Marcos Perestrello	2024–present	Portugal

== See also ==
- Enlargement of NATO
- Euro-Atlantic Partnership Council
- Foreign relations of NATO
- Individual Partnership Action Plan
- Major non-NATO ally
- Partnership for Peace
