= Israel–NATO relations =

Israel-NATO relations
- Israel: NATO

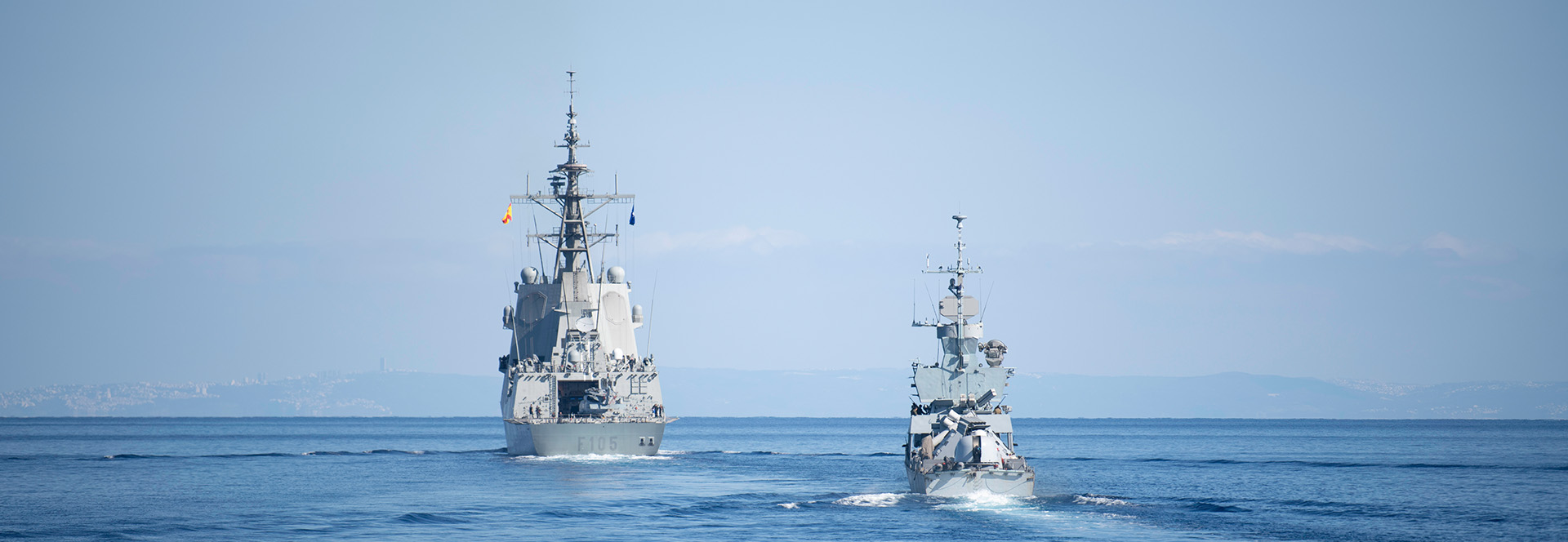
Port visit of the NATO Alliance's SNMG-2 Naval Task Force at the Naval Base in Haifa

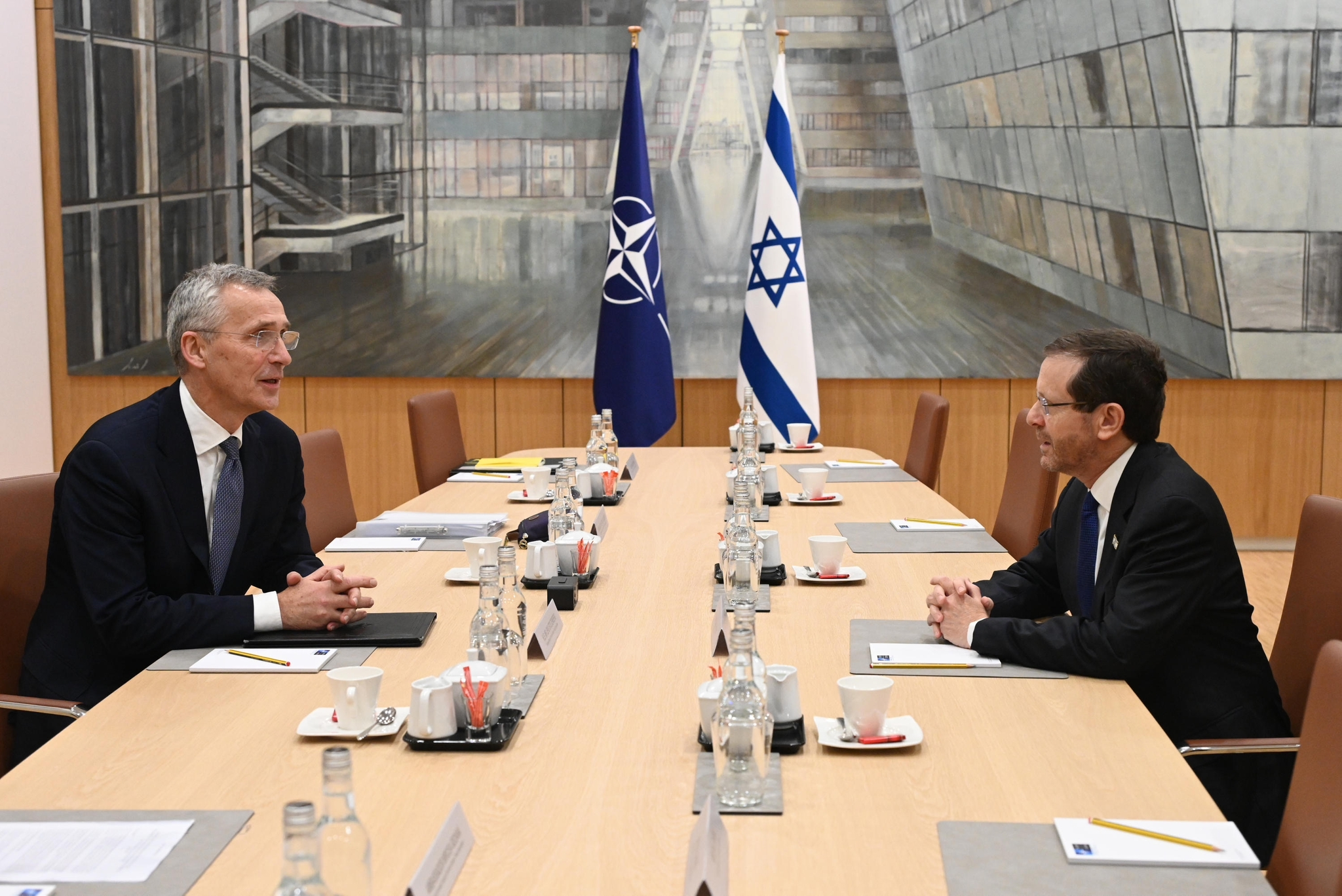
Meeting of the President of Israel and the Secretary General of NATO in Brussels

Israel–NATO relations are bilateral ties between Israel and the NATO military alliance. Although Israel is not a member of the Alliance, it has a special relationship with the organization and has been a major non-NATO ally since 1987.

== History ==
In March 1953, the North Atlantic Cooperation Council held a congress to discuss the situation in the Middle East and its place in the strategic defense plan. Despite his positive attitude towards Israel, he considered the possibility of concluding a defense agreement only with the Arab League states because of their vast territory. For Israel, there was an opportunity to sign a separate agreement, but this issue was not the main priority.

In 1957, Israel took steps to establish official ties with NATO or even obtain security guarantees from that organization. However, some NATO member countries opposed any contacts between the organization and Israel. When asked whether Israel can count on NATO's protection in the event of an attack by Arab countries, Paul Henri Spaak, NATO Secretary General, replied at a press conference that NATO is a military alliance with clearly defined geographical borders, and Israel is not part of these borders.

In May 1958, Israel was invited to a meeting of the Council of Europe. After that, a special commission was set up to discuss Israel's possible participation in the NATO economic procurement program. After that, Israel began to supply weapons and military equipment to the countries that are part of this organization.

In December 1987, Israel signed a memorandum with the United States on the status of a major non-NATO ally. This status was awarded by the US administration to particularly close allies with whom it maintains strategic relations but is not a member of the organization. This step was initiated by Defense Minister Yitzhak Rabin. The memorandum strengthened ties between the two countries in the field of defense research, development and procurement. It also included logistical support for Israel. The document compared Israel's status in the United States with that of a NATO member, which allowed it to participate in and gain access to U.S. security development programs. The memorandum also simplified the access of the Israeli defense industry to tenders from NATO countries. This was supposed to make it easier for them to participate in the tenders of the NATO countries.

In 1995, Israel was invited to participate in the Mediterranean Dialogue. This dialogue is the name of the cooperation for peace framework established by NATO in 1994. It is a mechanism for bilateral cooperation between NATO and its partners, which is an important part of the joint approach to security that was adopted by the North Atlantic Alliance after the end of the Cold War.

On January 9, 2002, a significant event took place at the NATO headquarters in Brussels: 19 ambassadors of NATO member countries, together with the ambassadors of seven other states, gathered for the forum. This was Israel's first invitation to participate in a NATO exercise. Since then, Israel has actively participated in various NATO rescue and humanitarian exercises in the Mediterranean, having the status of a "partner." However, after the tragic events with the flotilla in Gaza in 2010, Turkey, as a NATO member, vetoed Israel's continued participation in the exercises. In June 2016, after Israel and Turkey signed a reconciliation agreement, the veto was lifted. Agreements were also reached between the two countries on compensation to the families of the flotilla participants.

In June 2006, Israel joined the NATO cataloging system. This system was developed in order to standardize the use of inventory and equipment in all NATO member countries. Its goal is to create a common logistics language for all members of the alliance, especially in the context of military operations, when each of them applies its own unique logistics procedures. The idea of Israel joining the NATO cataloging system arose back in 2004, when a committee established in the Technology and Logistics department considered the need to unify procurement procedures in the security system. It was decided to implement the NATO cataloging system. In 2006, Minister Avigdor Lieberman initiated Israel's accession to the European Union and NATO. In April 2007, the NATO naval forces took part in exercises that took place in Eilat, together with the Navy. In December 2008, Israel sent a missile ship to the Mediterranean Sea as part of Operation Active Endeavour. During this operation, the alliance ships scanned ships in the region to prevent terrorists and weapons of mass destruction from boarding them, as well as to increase the safety of navigation.

In 2009, NATO Secretary General Jaap de Hoop Scheffer stated that Israel could not become a member of the organization and enjoy the obligations of joint protection provided for in Article 5 unless a peace agreement was concluded with the Palestinians, as well as until another Arab state joined the alliance. In addition, Israel's membership in NATO imposes certain obligations on it, such as:

- the need to consult before major military operations;
- The obligation to sign a treaty banning the proliferation of nuclear weapons.

Article 5 also obliges Israel to participate in the defense of any member State of the organization in the event of an attack.

In early 2012, NATO officials announced that the alliance was exploring the possibility of including an Israeli Navy in the NATO task force in the Mediterranean.

On May 3, 2016, NATO announced that Israeli representatives would be able to complete the signing process and open an office at the organization's headquarters in Brussels. In September 2016, Aharon Leshano-Ya'ar, Israel's first ambassador to NATO and previously served as ambassador to the European Union, presented the so-called Charter.

In November 2016, Israel was invited to participate in a three-day exercise called Black Mountain. They were attended by 680 people from 32 countries.

In November 2017, Israel and NATO signed an agreement on the mutual exchange of security information.

On February 9, 2018, a cooperation agreement was signed between Israel and NATO. This agreement gave Israeli companies the opportunity to participate in NATO tenders.

In June 2019, Israel participated for the first time in the annual NATO Sabre Strike exercises, which were held in Eastern Europe. Dozens of soldiers of the Israel Defense Forces took part in the exercises.

In November 2024, Avi Nir-Feldklein was appointed Israel's ambassador to the European Union and the NATO institutions.

== See also ==
- Foreign relations of Israel
- Foreign relations of NATO
