= Foreign relations of NATO =

Overview of multilateral relations

Map of Europe with countries in six different colors based on their affiliation with NATO as follows: Members of NATO Membership Action Plan / Enhanced Opportunity Partner Individual Partnership Action Plan Partnership for Peace; Note that Membership Action Plan and Individual Partnership Action Plan countries are also Partnership for Peace members. States acceding to NATO replace Partnership for Peace membership with formal entry into the Alliance.

NATO (the North Atlantic Treaty Organization) maintains foreign relations with many non-member countries across the globe. NATO runs a number of programs which provide a framework for the partnerships between itself and these non-member nations, typically based on that country's location. These include the Euro-Atlantic Partnership Council and the Partnership for Peace.

== European Union ==
23 out of the 27 EU member states are members of NATO. Four EU member states, who have declared their non-alignment with military alliances, are: Austria, Cyprus, Ireland, and Malta. All these countries except Cyprus have joined the Partnership for Peace programme.

=== Austria ===
Austria was occupied by the four victorious Allied powers following World War II under the Allied Control Council, similar to Germany. During negotiations to end of the occupation, which were ongoing at the same time as Germany's, the Soviet Union insisted on the reunified country adopting the model of Swiss neutrality. The US feared that this would encourage West Germany to accept similar Soviet proposals for neutrality as a condition for German reunification. Shortly after West Germany's accession to NATO, the parties agreed to the Austrian State Treaty in May 1955, which was largely based on the Moscow Memorandum signed the previous month between Austria and the Soviet Union. While the treaty itself did not commit Austria to neutrality, this was subsequently enshrined into Austria's constitution that October with the Declaration of Neutrality. The Declaration prohibits Austria from joining a military alliance, from hosting foreign military bases within its borders, and from participating in a war.

Membership of Austria in the European Union (or its predecessor organizations) was controversial due to the Austrian commitment to neutrality. Austria only joined in 1995, together with two Nordic countries that had also declared their neutrality in the Cold War (Sweden and Finland). Austria joined NATO's Partnership for Peace in 1995, and participates in NATO's Euro-Atlantic Partnership Council. The Austrian military also participates in the United Nations peacekeeping operations and has deployments in several countries as of 2022, including Kosovo, Lebanon, and Bosnia and Herzegovina, where it has led the EUFOR mission there since 2009. Conservative politician Andreas Khol, the 2016 presidential nominee from the Austrian People's Party (ÖVP), has argued in favor of NATO membership for Austria in light of the 2022 Russian invasion of Ukraine, and Chancellor from 2000 to 2007, Wolfgang Schüssel, also of the ÖVP, supported NATO membership as part of European integration. Current Chancellor Karl Nehammer, however, has rejected the idea of reopening Austria's neutrality and membership is not widely popular with the Austrian public.

According to a survey in May 2022 by the Austria Press Agency, only 14% of Austrians surveyed supported joining NATO, while 75% were opposed. Following the accession of Finland and Sweden into NATO in 2023 and 2024 respectively, there have been renewed debates on Austria joining the bloc, similar to how Austria joined the EU alongside Finland and Sweden. On 8 May 2022, a coalition of politicians, diplomats, artists and businesspeople wrote an open letter to the Austrian government asking them to review their commitment to neutrality. However, the only party to support the effort was NEOS, which holds 15 of the 183 seats in the National Council. On 3 March 2023, another survey was held by the Austrian Society for European Politics on NATO ascension which found 21% are in favor with 61% against. This was an increase of both 7% in favor and 7% unsure, compared to the last survey 10 months prior.

=== Cyprus ===
Cyprus is the only EU member state that is neither a NATO member state nor a member of the PfP program. The Parliament of Cyprus voted in February 2011 to apply for membership in the program, but President Demetris Christofias vetoed the decision, arguing that it would hamper his attempts to negotiate an end to the Cyprus dispute and demilitarize the island. Turkey, a full member of NATO, is likely to veto any attempt by Cyprus to engage with NATO until the dispute is resolved. Nicos Anastasiades, who was elected President in 2013, stated that he intended to apply for membership in the PfP program soon after taking over. His foreign minister Nikos Christodoulides later dismissed Cypriot membership of NATO or Partnership for Peace, preferring to keep Cyprus' foreign and defence affairs within the framework of the EU, i.e. the Common Security and Defence Policy (CSDP).

After the 2023 presidential election, Anastasiades' foreign minister Christodoulides succeeded him as president. In November 2024, Christodoulides reversed his previous stance and revealed a plan to deepen Cyprus' relations with NATO and eventually join as a full member. Under the first phase of the plan, Cyprus would seek to join preparatory organizations linked to NATO, which would require progress in resolving the Cyprus dispute with NATO member Turkey and improvements to EU–Turkey relations. Practical steps of the plan include securing a longer-term exemption from the U.S. arms embargo, expanding joint military training opportunities for the Cypriot National Guard at U.S. military academies, and modernization of Cyprus' defense infrastructure to meet NATO standards. Christodoulides stated that "the U.S. response has been very positive" and that these steps "will ensure that, once all conditions are met, Cyprus can join NATO".

=== Ireland ===
Ireland has been a member of NATO's Partnership for Peace (PfP) programme since 1999, and is a member of the alliance's Euro-Atlantic Partnership Council (EAPC), but has never officially applied to join as a full NATO member due to its traditional policy of military neutrality. Ireland participates in the PfP Planning and Review Process (PARP), which aims to increase the interoperability of the Irish military, the Defence Forces, with other NATO member states and bring them into line with accepted international standards so as to successfully deploy with other professional military forces on peacekeeping operations overseas.

Irish government policy for the deployment of troops to NATO-led missions requires that the missions be mandated by the United Nations (UN Security Council resolution or UN General Assembly resolution), cabinet-backed and approved by Dáil Éireann (the Irish parliament). This is known as Ireland's "triple lock". Ireland supplied a limited number of troops to the NATO-led International Security Assistance Force (ISAF) in Afghanistan (2001–2014) and supports the ongoing NATO-led Kosovo Force (KFOR), as these were sanctioned by UNSC resolutions.

Public opinion in Ireland continues to favour a policy of neutrality in armed conflicts, and currently no major political party fully supports ascension into NATO. There has been, and continues to be, a number of politicians who support Ireland joining NATO, mainly within the centre-right Fine Gael party, but the majority of politicians still do not. It is widely understood that a referendum would have to be held before any changes could be made to neutrality or to joining NATO. Former Secretary General of NATO Anders Fogh Rasmussen said during a visit to the country in 2013 that the "door is open" for Ireland to join NATO at any time.

=== Malta ===
When the North Atlantic Treaty was signed in 1949, the Mediterranean island of Malta was a dependent territory of the United Kingdom, one of the treaty's original signatories. As such, the Crown Colony of Malta shared the UK's international memberships, including NATO. Between 1952 and 1965, the headquarters of the Allied Forces Mediterranean was based in the town of Floriana, just outside Malta's capital of Valletta. When Malta gained independence in 1964, prime minister George Borg Olivier wanted the country to join NATO. Olivier was concerned that the presence of the NATO headquarters in Malta, without the security guarantees that NATO membership entailed, made the country a potential target. However, according to a memorandum he prepared at the time he was discouraged from formally submitting a membership application by Deputy Secretary General of NATO James A. Roberts. It was believed that some NATO members, including the United Kingdom, were opposed to Maltese NATO membership. As a result, Olivier considered alternatives, such as seeking associate membership or unilateral security guarantees from NATO, or closing the NATO headquarters in Malta in retaliation. Ultimately, Olivier supported the alliance and signed a defense agreement with the UK for use of Maltese military facilities in exchange for around £2 million a year. This friendly policy changed in 1971, when Dom Mintoff, of the Labour Party, was elected as prime minister. Mintoff supported neutrality as his foreign policy, and the position was later enshrined into the country's constitution in 1974 as an amendment to Article 1. The country joined the Non-Aligned Movement in 1979, at the same time when the British Royal Navy left its base at the Malta Dockyard.

In 1995, under Prime Minister Eddie Fenech Adami of the Nationalist Party, Malta joined the Euro-Atlantic Partnership Council multilateral defense forum and NATO's Partnership for Peace program. When the Labour Party regained power the following year, however, they withdrew Malta from both organizations. Though the Nationalists resumed the majority in parliament in 1998, Malta didn't rejoin the EAPC and PfP programs again until 2008, after the country had joined the European Union in 2004. Since re-joining, Malta has been building its relations with NATO and getting involved in wider projects including the PfP Planning and Review Process and the NATO Science for Peace and Security Program.

NATO membership is not supported by any of the country's political parties, including neither the governing Labour Party nor the opposition Nationalist Party. NATO's secretary-general Jens Stoltenberg has stated that the alliance fully respects Malta's position of neutrality, and put no pressure for the country to join the alliance. Polling done by the island-nation's Ministry of Foreign Affairs found in February 2022 that 63% of those surveyed supported the island's neutrality, and only 6% opposed the policy, with 14% undecided. A Eurobarometer survey in May 2022 found that 75% of Maltese would however support greater military cooperation within the European Union.

== Europe ==
=== Microstates ===
NATO has diplomatic relations with the 5 European microstates: Andorra, Liechtenstein, Monaco, San Marino, and Vatican City. These microstates are neutral, have only nominal militaries, are surrounded by NATO members (except for Liechtenstein), and are part of the OSCE but do not participate in NATO's PfP.

Liechtenstein has not had an army since 1866. However, the constitution states that the army may be reformed at any time should it be deemed necessary. As of January 2025, there are no plans by the Liechtenstein government to seek NATO membership.

=== Armenia ===
Armenia has maintained positive relations with NATO members and has signed up for the Partnership for Peace programme, the Euro-Atlantic Partnership Council and the Individual Partnership Action Plan. However, Armenia is unlikely to join NATO as its policies often align it closer with Russia, and it remains a member of the Commonwealth of Independent States and the Collective Security Treaty Organization. Armenia pulled out of its participation in NATO military exercises in Georgia on 8 May 2009, because of NATO's Secretary-General's alleged support of Azerbaijan, possibly making it even less likely that Armenia would eventually join NATO. Armenia does however participate in certain NATO peacekeeping operations. Armenia deployed approximately 130 soldiers in Afghanistan, as part of the NATO-led International Security Assistance Force (ISAF). They were serving under German command protecting an airport in Konduz.

On 3 September 2023, Armenian prime minister Nikol Pashinyan stated that it was a strategic mistake for Armenia to solely rely on Russia to guarantee its security. Pashinyan confirmed that Armenia is trying to diversify its security arrangements, most notably with the European Union and the United States. On 23 February 2024, Prime Minister of Armenia, Nikol Pashinyan, confirmed that Armenia has frozen its participation in the CSTO. Pashinyan stated, "We have now in practical terms frozen our participation in this treaty" and "membership of the CSTO was under review" during a live broadcast interview. On 28 February 2024, during a speech made in the National Assembly, Pashinyan further stated that the CSTO is "a threat to the national security of Armenia".

=== Azerbaijan ===
Azerbaijan was originally a member of the Collective Security Treaty Organization, but has since committed to a policy of neutrality in 1999. While President Ilham Aliyev has generally supported non-belligerency (though not neutrality due to the unresolved conflict with Armenia over Nagorno-Karabakh) since his rise to power in 2003, Azerbaijan has hosted NATO military exercises and high-profile meetings in 2009. Azerbaijan made its policy of not being aligned with a geopolitical/military structure official when it became a full member of the Non-Aligned Movement in 2011.

=== Bosnia and Herzegovina ===
The 1995 NATO bombing of Bosnia and Herzegovina targeted the Bosnian Serb Army and together with international pressure led to the resolution of the Bosnian War and the signing of the Dayton Agreement in 1995. Since then, NATO has led the Implementation Force and Stabilization Force, and other peacekeeping efforts in the country.

Bosnia and Herzegovina joined the Partnership for Peace program of NATO in 2006, and signed an agreement on security cooperation in March 2007. The nation began further cooperation with NATO within their Individual Partnership Action Plan in January 2008. Bosnia then started the process of Intensified Dialogue at the 2008 Bucharest summit. The country was invited to join the Adriatic Charter of NATO aspirants on 25 September 2008. Then in November 2008, a joint announcement from the Defence Minister and the NATO Mission Office in Sarajevo suggested that Bosnia and Herzegovina could join NATO by 2011 if it continued the defense reforms made so far.

In January 2009, Defence Minister Selmo Cikotić again confirmed Bosnia's interest in seeking a Membership Action Plan (MAP) at the 2009 summit, with membership by 2012 at the latest. In February 2009 Defence Minister Selmo Cikotić presented poll numbers on NATO membership: 70% of the country supports NATO membership; however while 89% of the Federation Entity supports NATO membership, only 44% in the RS Entity did. While the country did not receive a MAP at the April 2009 summit in Strasbourg–Kehl, Stuart Jones, an official of the US State Department, said on a September 2009 visit to Bosnia and Herzegovina that NATO was going to look at the possibilities for them to receive one in a December 2009 summit, repeating strong US support for the possibility. Then on 2 October 2009, Haris Silajdžić, the Bosniak Member of the Presidency, announced an official application for a MAP. On 22 April 2010, NATO agreed to launch the MAP for Bosnia and Herzegovina, but with certain conditions. Turkey is thought to be the biggest supporter of Bosnian membership.

Bosnia and Herzegovina has yet to fulfil the condition to launch an Annual National Programme under its MAP: the transfer of the registration of 63 military facilities from the local level to the central government. As of November 2018, 33 have been fully transferred, all of which are located in the Federation of Bosnia and Herzegovina. The Republika Srpska (RS), the Serbian political subdivision of Bosnia, opposes the move and refuses to transfer the 23 properties located in its territory. A Bosnian court has ruled that it must transfer the military facility in Han Pijesak in RS to the Bosnian government. This was upheld by a ruling of the Constitutional Court of Bosnia and Herzegovina on 16 August 2017.

Despite the fact that all immovable property is not fully registered, NATO approved the activation of the Membership Action Plan for Bosnia and Herzegovina, and called on Bosnia to submit an Annual National Program on 5 December 2018. On 17 December, United States Deputy Secretary of State John Sullivan stated the United States supports Bosnia and Herzegovina's bid to join NATO, and dismissed Serb objections by adding that "Washington would react strongly to any threat to the stability of the country". The submission of a MAP Annual National Program was delayed due to a veto by Milorad Dodik, the Serb member of the Bosnian Presidency. The issue also prevented the formation of a government following the 2018 Bosnian general election. On 19 November 2019, as part of a broader deal on government formation, Dodik agreed to a Reform Program which would be sent to Brussels. However, there is disagreement on whether this Reform Program is actually an Annual National Program under NATO.

=== Kosovo ===
Kosovo submitted an application to join the PfP program in July 2012, though its lack of recognition by four NATO member states could impede its accession. Kosovo's parliament was upgraded to associate member status of the NATO Parliamentary Assembly in March 2024.

=== Moldova ===
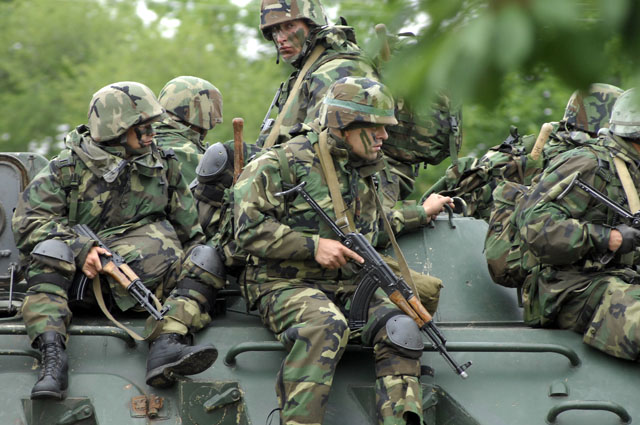
Moldovan soldiers participate in Exercise Peace Shield 2011 in Bulboaca with US and NATO experts

Moldova does not currently have plans to join NATO. It has participated in the Partnership for Peace programme and the Individual Partnership Action Plan. The former communist government was seen as more allied with Russia and is already a member of the Commonwealth of Independent States. In April 2009 Moldova announced it would not participate in the June NATO military exercises. The new ruling party, the Alliance for European Integration, elected in the July 2009 Moldovan parliamentary election, declined to take any action to either move it toward membership, or withdraw from the Commonwealth of Independent States, and denied plans to do either. Moldova also has an ongoing internal conflict with the territory of Transnistria.

=== Russia ===
In April 2009, the Polish Foreign Minister, Radosław Sikorski, suggested including Russia in NATO. In March 2010 this suggestion was repeated in an open letter co-written by German defense experts General Klaus Naumann, Frank Elbe, Ulrich Weisser, and former German Defense Minister Volker Rühe. In the letter it was suggested that Russia was needed in the wake of an emerging multi-polar world in order for NATO to counterbalance emerging Asian powers. However Russian leadership has made it clear that Russia does not plan to join the alliance, preferring to keep cooperation on a lower level. The Russian envoy to NATO, Dmitry Rogozin, is quoted as saying "Great powers don't join coalitions, they create coalitions. Russia considers itself a great power," although he said that Russia did not rule out membership at some point in the future.

=== Serbia ===
NATO historically fought Bosnian-Serbian forces during the Bosnian War and intervened in 1999 in the Kosovo War by bombing targets in Serbia (then part of FR Yugoslavia). After the overthrow of President Slobodan Milošević, Serbia wanted to improve its relations with NATO. However, a future membership in the military alliance remained highly controversial, because among political parties and large sections of society there were still resentments due to NATO bombing of Yugoslavia in 1999. In the years under Prime Minister Zoran Đinđić the country (then Serbia and Montenegro) did not rule out joining NATO. But after Đinđić's assassination in 2003, Belgrade increasingly started preferring a course of military neutrality (officially declared in 2007).

The subsequent independence of Montenegro and Kosovo have strained relations between Serbia and NATO. Serbia however joined the Partnership for Peace programme during the 2006 Riga Summit. While this programme is sometimes the first step towards full NATO membership, it is uncertain whether Serbia perceives it as signaling an intent to join the alliance.

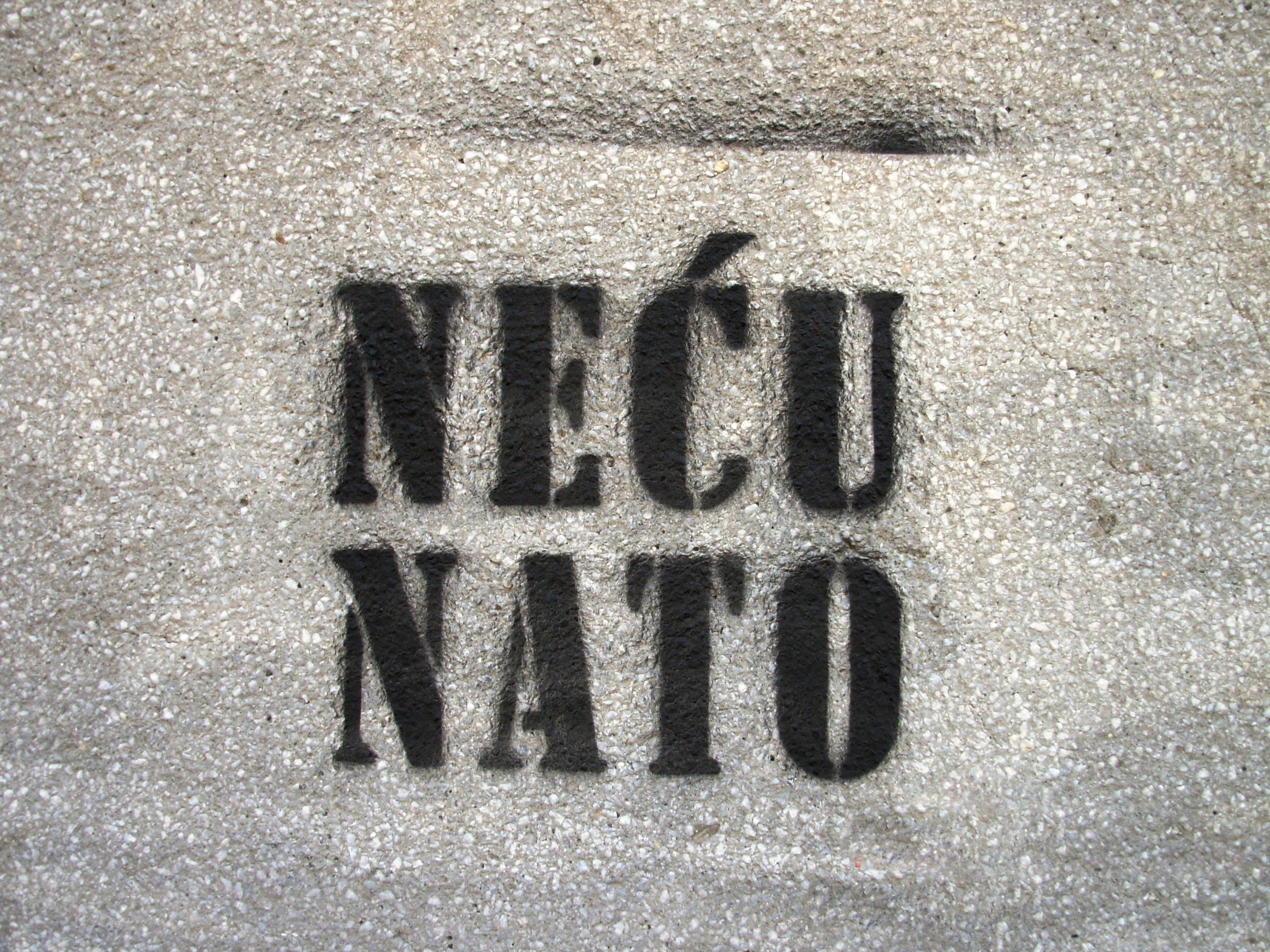
Neću NATO (eng. I do not want NATO) Anti-NATO signs in Serbia in 2011

Following NATO's open support of Kosovo's declaration of independence in 2008, support for NATO integration in Serbia greatly dropped. A 2007 poll had shown that 28% of Serbian citizens supported NATO membership, with 58% supporting the Partnership for Peace. The Democratic Party abandoned its pro-NATO attitude, claiming the Partnership for Peace is enough.

Although current Serbian priorities do not include NATO membership, the Alliance has offered Serbia an invitation to enter the intensified dialogue programme whenever the country is ready. In 2008, Serbian Defence Minister Dragan Šutanovac signed the Information Exchange Agreement with the NATO, one of the prerequisites for fuller membership in the Partnership for Peace programme.

In 2015, Serbia implemented its first Individual Partnership Action Plan with NATO, regularly participates in its military maneuvers and hosted a joint civil protection exercise with NATO in 2018.

=== Switzerland ===
Switzerland has several centuries of military and political neutrality. After the 2022 Russian invasion of Ukraine, Swiss support for closer NATO alliance reached historic highs.

=== Ukraine ===
At the beginning of 2008, the Ukrainian President, Prime Minister and head of parliament sent an official letter to apply for the Membership Action Plan. The idea of Ukrainian membership in NATO has gained support from a number of NATO leaders. At the 2008 Bucharest summit, NATO Secretary General Jaap de Hoop Scheffer declared in a press conference that Georgia and Ukraine would eventually join NATO. Within the NATO-Ukraine working commission, NATO officials reassured Ukraine officials that they are willing to invite their country to join the Alliance. The Deputy Foreign Minister of Russia, Alexander Grushko, announced that NATO membership for Ukraine was not in Russia's best interests and wouldn't help the relations of the two countries.

According to numerous independent polls conducted between 2002 and the events of 2014, Ukrainian public opinion on NATO membership was split, with the majority of those polled against joining the military alliance and many identifying it as a threat. According to the FOM-Ukraine pollster, as of April 2009, 57% of Ukrainians polled were against joining the alliance, while 21% were in favor. A Gallup poll conducted in October 2008 showed that 45% associated NATO as a threat to their country, while only 15% associated it with protection. Ukrainian politicians such as Yuriy Yekhanurov and Yulia Tymoshenko stated Ukraine would not join NATO as long as the public continued opposing the move. In 2008 the Ukrainian government started an information campaign, aimed at informing the Ukrainian people about the consequences of membership.

The 2010 election returned Viktor Yanukovych as Ukrainian President and marked a turnaround in Ukraine's relations with NATO. In February 2010, he stated that Ukraine's relations with NATO were currently "well-defined", and that there was "no question of Ukraine joining NATO". He said the issue of Ukrainian membership of NATO might "emerge at some point, but we will not see it in the immediate future." While visiting Brussels in March 2010, he further stated that there would be no change to Ukraine's status as a member of the alliance's outreach program. He later reiterated during a trip to Moscow that Ukraine would remain a "European, non-aligned state." Then, on 3 June 2010 the Ukrainian parliament voted to exclude the goal of "integration into Euro-Atlantic security and NATO membership" from the country's national security strategy in a bill drafted by Yanukovych himself.

Amid the Euromaidan unrest, Yanukovych fled Ukraine in February 2014. The interim Yatsenyuk Government which came to power, initially said, with reference to the country's non-aligned status, that it had no plans to join NATO. However, following the Russian invasion of Ukraine and parliamentary elections in October 2014, the new government made joining NATO a priority. On 23 December 2014, the Ukrainian parliament renounced Ukraine's non-aligned status that "proved to be ineffective in guaranteeing Ukraine's security and protecting the country from external aggression and pressure". Ukraine and NATO have since held joint seminars and joint tactical and strategical exercises and operations.

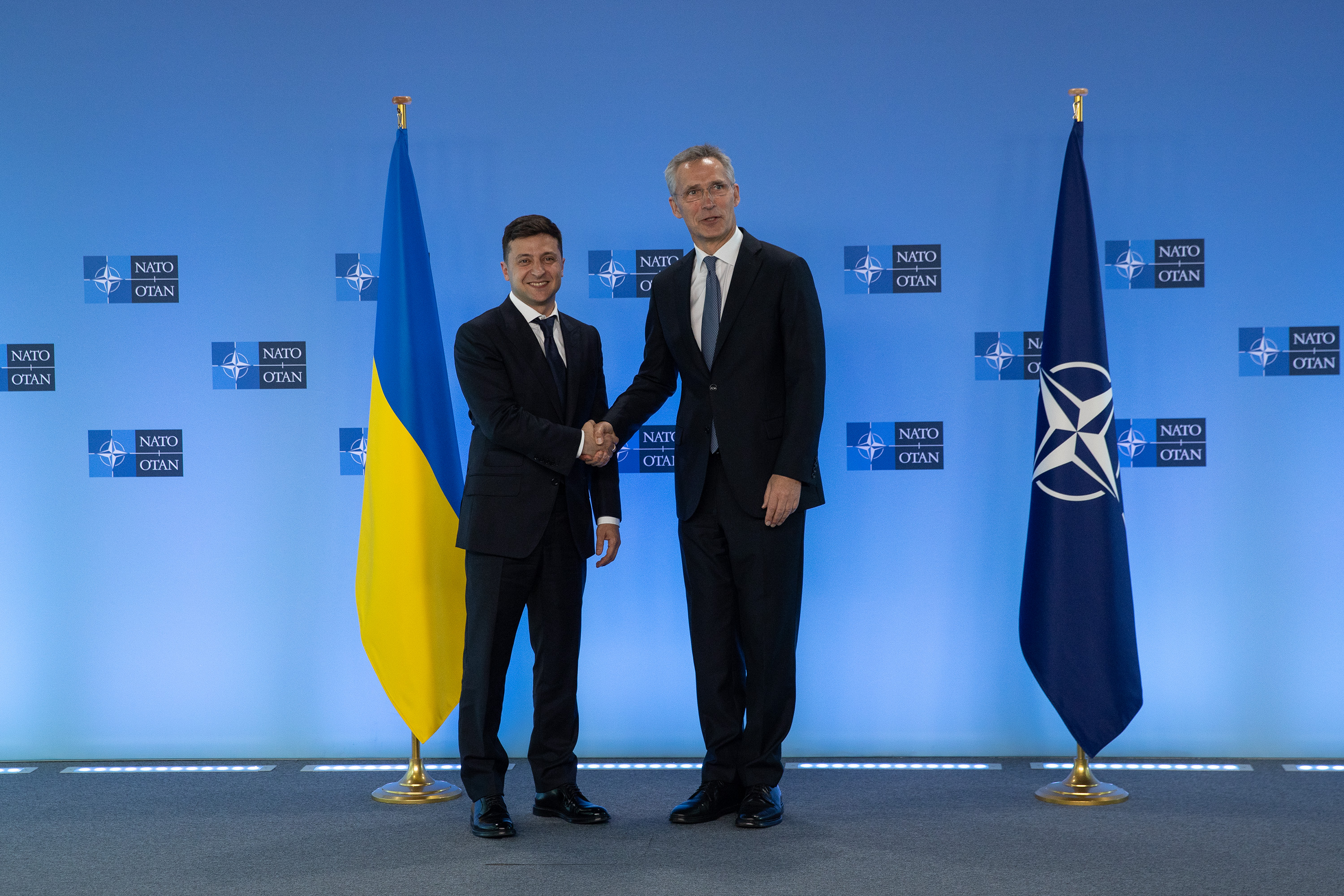
Ukrainian President Volodymyr Zelenskyy with NATO Secretary General Jens Stoltenberg in June 2019

Since the start of the 2014 Russian military intervention in Ukraine, public support for Ukrainian membership in NATO has risen greatly. Since June 2014 polls show that about 50% of those asked voice support for Ukrainian membership. By early 2022 (just before the Russian invasion of Ukraine began), support had risen further to 62% as Russia built up forces near the Ukrainian border. In March 2022, Volodymyr Zelenskyy, president of Ukraine, stated that he did not anticipate Ukraine joining NATO in the near future. However, in September 2022, he announced that Ukraine has applied for NATO membership under an accelerated procedure, following Russia's claimed annexation of Southeastern Ukraine. The inaugural meeting of the NATO-Ukraine Council happened on 12 July 2023 at the NATO's 2023 Vilnius Summit. The Council met at the level of Heads of State and Government, including the participation of Ukrainian President Volodymyr Zelenskyy.

== Global NATO ==
In 2006, the then United States Ambassador to NATO Ivo H. Daalder together with James Goldgeier conceived the term "Global NATO". Subsequently, ideas for membership of various states were floated: Brazil, South Africa, Singapore, India, Israel, and most frequently the Indo-Pacific Four group of Australia, Japan, South Korea, and New Zealand, as well as Colombia. The idea is to transform the Cold War institution into a "Global alliance of democracies".

=== Australia ===
The issue of Australian NATO membership is often brought forward. Australia is even referred to as a "de facto member of NATO". Australia is referred to by NATO as one of their "partners across the globe", agreeing to work on crisis and conflict management, post-conflict situations, reconstruction and facilitating humanitarian assistance and disaster relief. NATO and Australia signed a joint political declaration in June 2012 followed by a signature of an Individual Partnership and Cooperation Programme in February of the next year.

General Knud Bartels, Chairman of the NATO Military Committee at the time, stressed the need for "substantial and practical cooperation, to learn from each other, share best practices and develop common standards because NATO and Australia have a strong partnership and are committed to enhancing their abilities of working together in order to better tackle future global challenges". Australia attended the NATO Summit for first time in 2022.

=== Colombia ===
Colombia is NATO's latest partner in Latin America and Colombia has access to the full range of cooperative activities NATO offers to partners. NATO and Colombia have concluded a partnership agreement with a view to strengthening dialogue and cooperation to address shared security challenges. A close strategic ally and trade partner of the U.S. and Spain, Colombia has been a strong supporter of NATO and its actions. In 2009, the Colombian Government asked to be part of the ISAF and work with the Spanish contingent in mine detection operations, but this didn't materialize due to the internal conflict that Colombia faced. In March 2011, Colombia voted in favor of United Nations Security Council Resolution 1973, thus officially allowing for NATO military intervention in the Libyan Civil War. In April 2012, Colombia was amended into the NATO ATP-56(B) which gave Colombia "associate" status and to re-establish air-to-air fueling capabilities with NATO member countries.

On 4 June 2013, Colombian President Juan Manuel Santos announced that Colombia will be signing a Cooperation Agreement with NATO in hopes of eventually joining the military alliance. Santos also stated that: "If we can achieve peace, the army will be in a place where it will be able to distinguish itself internationally as well. We are already doing it on many fronts." In response, the U.S. government noted, "Our goal is certainly to support Colombia as being a capable and strong member of lots of different international organizations, and that might well include NATO. Ultimately this is a decision that all of the NATO members would have to make."

However, on the same day, a Colombian and NATO official both objected to NATO membership for Colombia. Defense Minister Juan Carlos Pinzon stated his country merely wished to sign a cooperation deal with NATO, and a NATO official noted that, "There is no immediate plan for establishing a formal partnership between the alliance and Colombia, but we are exploring the possibility of carrying out specific activities together...and we are currently developing a security of information agreement which would allow the exchange of classified information between the alliance and Colombia."

On 10 March 2022, in the context of the 2022 Russian invasion of Ukraine and amidst talks of new oil negotiations with Venezuela, US President Joe Biden announced Colombia had been designated Major Non-NATO Ally, in a bilateral meeting at the White House.

Relations between NATO and Colombia began in 2013 with the signing of an agreement on the security of information. In May 2017, Colombia formalized its status as a NATO "Global Partner," becoming the first and only Latin American nation to achieve this designation. Cooperation initially centered on military education, defense transparency, information sharing, and cybersecurity frameworks. The relationship shifted substantially following the election of leftist President Gustavo Petro. On 16 July 2025, Petro announced his intention to withdraw Colombia from its global partnership with NATO, citing deep objections to the support provided by certain European member states to Israel during the conflict in Gaza and international weapons supplies.

According to regional analysts, the decision to exit the alliance impacts Colombia's security sector reform, limiting its access to technological interoperability, military modernization tools, and international programs concerning the ethical integration of artificial intelligence in defense.

=== India ===
In September 2011, The NATO alliance invited India to be a partner in its ballistic missile defence (BMD). According to the reports a top NATO official stated addressing Indian representatives, "You have a missile threat that confronts you. We have a missile threat that confronts us. It's a different one, but our ability to defend against it could be the same. We have cooperation on those kind of issues. [..]Democracies face challenges that are common. We need to work together and resolve. We need to cooperate, because individually we cannot deal with such threats. It is better to deal with such issues commonly than deal with them individually." V. K. Saraswat, the architect of Indian BMD program, subsequently informed, "We are analysing the report. It is under consideration."

Then-U.S. NATO Ambassador Ivo H. Daalder has suggested that India should turn away from its non-aligned role and join NATO. A Voice of Russia analysis quoted Robert Pshel, head of NATO's Information Office in Moscow as saying "I agree with Mr Daalder that many modern threats are global, and tackling them without emerging powers like India is hardly possible." Daalder further stated, "The dialogue should be on how India's concept of its own security and of international security fits in with NATO's concept of international security and how NATO as an actor and India as a country can work together to promote security."

The United States and India have already studied the possibility of a joint missile defence system, although former Defence Secretary Robert Gates stated that "talks were only in their early stages." Boris Volkonsky of the Russian Strategic Research Institute was quoted as saying, "an ally like India would strengthen Washington's hand in South and Southwest Asia and other world areas." A Voice of Russia analysis speculated on an additional, ulterior motive from a shared Indian and American fear of the "rising dragon of China".

And while most members of the Indian strategic community readily admit that NATO's Afghanistan mission coincides with India's own strategic interest in stabilising that country, they do not necessarily conclude from this that India and NATO should develop closer cooperation. It is believed that many Indian analysts harbour doubts about the possible implications for their country's international position should it develop closer ties with NATO. In a report published by NATO review it said, "The choice should be clear: exploiting NATO's potential as a forum for consultation and cooperation is a 'win-win' situation, both for India and for the Alliance."

=== Israel ===
Israel was designated as a major non-NATO ally in 1987 by US President Ronald Reagan and has since cooperated with NATO in the areas of technology, counterterrorism and other areas.

In a 2 March 2026 interview with BBC News, NATO Secretary General Mark Rutte expressed strong support for the ongoing U.S. and Israeli military actions against Iran, characterizing the Iranian regime as a "threat" to regional and European security. He praised U.S. and Israeli military strikes against Iran for degrading Tehran's nuclear and ballistic missile capabilities, calling the action "very important". However, Rutte stressed that NATO as an alliance would not be involved in the conflict, noting that such involvement is limited to individual member states.

=== Japan ===
Cooperation between Japan and NATO began in 1990, and Japan was one of the first "partners across the globe" when the relationship became more formalized. Japan deepened their relationship in April 2013 with a joint political declaration, and in May 2014 signed accords relating to counter-terrorism and counter-piracy efforts. Japan has also been involved in the NATO-led International Security Assistance Force in Afghanistan and with stabilization efforts in the Balkans during the 1990s.

On 29 June 2022, the Prime Minister of Japan attended the NATO Summit for first time, as the trans-Atlantic alliance seeks to deepen ties with Asia-Pacific partners amid China's rise. Japan and NATO signed the Individually Tailored Partnership Program (ITPP) in 2023.

In May 2023, Prime Minister Fumio Kishida stated Japan had no plans to join NATO as a member or semi-member state. In June 2023, it was reported that NATO and Japan had agreed to open its first Asia liaison office in Tokyo in 2024 for use as a hub for co-operation with Australia, Japan, New Zealand and South Korea. However, these plans were later shelved.

On 26 February 2024, Minister for Foreign Affairs of Japan Yoko Kamikawa and NATO Supreme Allied Commander Europe (SACEUR) Christopher G. Cavoli agreed to strengthen cooperation between Tokyo and the alliance. Both sides welcomed the progress of concrete cooperation between Japan and NATO in areas such as cyber, space, and maritime security, and concurred to further strengthen Japan-NATO cooperation.

=== South Korea ===
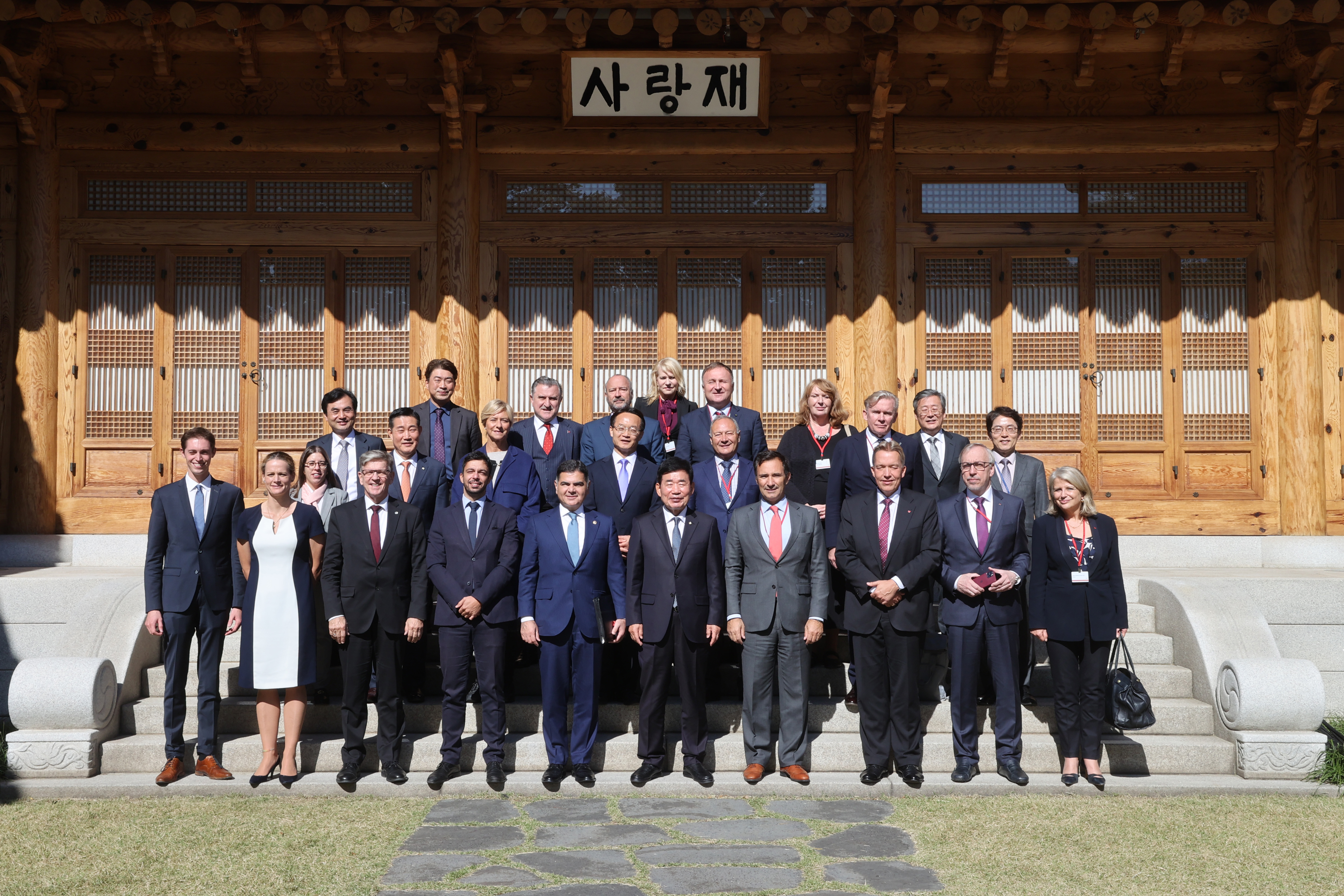
NATO Parliamentary Union Delegation to South Korea, October 2022

South Korea is a global NATO partner and major non-NATO ally which has cooperated with NATO in multiple areas. For example, South Korea contributed substantially to rebuilding efforts after the 2001 war in Afghanistan. South Korea has also worked with NATO in the areas of non-proliferation and anti-WMD initiatives, advanced scientific and technology research as well as taken measures to ensure interoperability with NATO forces, including through joint exercises with NATO member countries through events such as RIMPAC and participation at NATO leadership meetings.

South Korea and NATO relations have improved rapidly under South Korean President Yoon Suk Yeol and after Russia invaded Ukraine in 2022 and Seoul has become a key partner to NATO. Yoon attended the NATO Summit for first time in 2022 and later in 2023 and 2024 as well. In 2022, South Korea opened its diplomatic mission to NATO in Brussels and was the first East Asian country that joined a NATO centre excellence (the Cooperative Cyber Defence Centre of Excellence). In 2023, South Korea and NATO signed the Individually Tailored Partnership Program (ITPP) and started regular military staff consultations. Although the relations between South Korea and NATO deepened rapidly after the Russian invasion of Ukraine, they were enabled by the combination of several factors including previous collaborations and personal relations. Furthermore, South Korea has become a major armament exporter to those European NATO countries which wanted to increase their military capabilities quickly, as it was able to deliver large quantities of sophisticated complex weapon systems rapidly and cost-effectively after 2022. These armament deals have increased South Korea's relevance to NATO further.

In 2024, President Yoon tried to declare martial law and was subsequently removed from office. Lee Jae Myung, who was elected president in 2025, de-emphasized relations with NATO, favoring a "pragmatic" foreign policy that includes improving relations with Russia. Unlike Yoon, Lee did not attend the 2025 The Hague NATO summit.

=== Mongolia ===
The NATO–Mongolia Individual Partnership and Cooperation Programme was approved on 19 March 2012. It is the first application of the new policy for flexible partnerships with global partners. Mongolia has worked with NATO on initiatives relating to interoperability, military modernization and officer training, as well as provided troops to support NATO's operations in Afghanistan from 2009 to 2014. More recently, Mongolia has been working together with NATO on Science for Peace and Security Programme, which focuses on cybersecurity and reducing the environmental impact of military sites.

=== New Zealand ===
In 2001, NATO and New Zealand signalled their commitment to strengthen cooperation with the joint signature of an Individual Partnership and Cooperation Programme in June 2012. New Zealand has made valuable contributions to NATO-led efforts in Afghanistan, as part of the International Security Assistance Force and Resolute Support missions to train, advise and assist the Afghan security forces and institutions. New Zealand attended the NATO Summit for first time in 2022.

=== Pakistan ===
Pakistan is a major non-NATO ally, cooperating in several main sectors: fighting insurgency and terrorism in Bosnia and Herzegovina and Afghanistan, military cooperation, transportation and logistics operations support to Afghanistan, and non-proliferation.

=== Saudi Arabia ===
Although not a NATO member, Saudi Arabia has engaged in security dialogues with the Alliance, including a February 2026 visit by the NATO Special Representative for the Southern Neighbourhood to discuss regional stability and partnership.

=== United Arab Emirates ===
On the sidelines of the Munich Security Conference in February 2026, UAE Minister of State Lana Nusseibeh met with NATO Secretary-General Mark Rutte to discuss deepening the partnership between the UAE and NATO, highlighting the UAE’s sustained training cooperation and participation in NATO-led operations.

== China ==
NATO member states have increasingly criticized China for its support of Russia during the Russian invasion of Ukraine.

During NATO's 75th anniversary summit in Washington, D.C., in July 2024, member states issued their strongest criticism of China to date, describing it as a "decisive enabler" of Russia's war against Ukraine. The final summit communiqué, adopted by all 32 NATO members, stated that China had become a major contributor to Russia’s "defence industrial base" through what it referred to as a "no limits" partnership between Beijing and Moscow. NATO called on the People's Republic of China to cease all material and political support for Russia’s war effort.

== See also ==
- Enlargement of NATO
- Euro-Atlantic Partnership Council
- European Union–NATO relations
- Individual Partnership Action Plan
- List of countries in Europe by military expenditures
- Major non-NATO ally – designated by the United States government
- NATO global partners
- NATO open door policy
- Partnership for Peace
- United States Mission to NATO
- Withdrawal from NATO
