= Partnership for Peace Information Management System =

Partnership for Peace Information Management System (PIMS) is a US Department of Defense Bilateral Cooperative Development Program started in 1996 to enable collaboration and communication between Partnership for Peace (PfP) countries and the NATO community.

== General information ==
PIMS is a US bilateral program which supports US-Partner relations and PfP mission through Information technology. The mission of the PIMS is to enable efficient reliable information exchange between PfP countries and the NATO community - a key first step in the orderly process of incorporating Partners into NATO initiatives. It aims at facilitating the rapid communications and coordination required to support individual PfP objectives as well as the overall goals of the PfP Program. By extending economical communications connectivity and an automated means for common access to information, PIMS is expected to support an environment conducive to multinational cooperation in Europe.

The Program was established on the premise that each Partner has relevant and pertinent information to contribute and is also in the best position to determine its own information requirements. Collaborative database development provides the practical approach to leverage information resources for all coalition partners. O&M cost sharing provides an economical means of accommodating individual needs for processing, connectivity, maintenance, system familiarization, and other technical services, when PIMS hardware is required. The terms of both arrangements are implemented through Memorandum of Agreement between US DOD and PIMS-installed Partners.

== Organization ==
PIMS is a virtual organization that includes users from the USA and across Eurasia. The PIMS Program is managed by SPAWAR Systems Center Charleston, European Division, located in Stuttgart, Germany. 10 In-Country Coordinators (ICCs) in PfP partner countries round out the PIMS team.

== Participating PfP Countries ==
European NATO members NATO members which were formerly PfP members Partnership for Peace members States which aspire to PfP membership

As of July 2010, the following PfP countries participate in the PIMS program: Armenia, Azerbaijan, Georgia, Kazakhstan, Kyrgyzstan, Republic of Macedonia, Moldova, Tajikistan, Ukraine, Uzbekistan.

Participating countries in the past include Albania, Bulgaria, Croatia, Czech Republic, Estonia, Latvia, Lithuania, Romania, Slovakia, Slovenia, Turkmenistan. All of these, but Turkmenistan, have eventually joined NATO.

== History and background ==
- 1996 - Established as a US Department of Defense Bilateral Cooperative Development Program with NATO PfP Partner Nations.
- 1997 - Installations in: Hungary, Poland, Ukraine, AF North, Marshall Center
- 1998 - Installations in: Albania, Bulgaria, Czech Republic, Estonia, EUCOM, JHQ NE, Kazakhstan (Almaty), Kyrgyz Republic, Latvia, Lithuania, Macedonia, Moldova, RHQ AFNO, Romania, Slovakia, Slovenia, Uzbekistan
- 1999 - Installations in: Baltic Defense College, Georgia, HQ NAVSOUTH, JHQ CENTCOM, SEEBRIG, SOUTHLANT, Turkmenistan
- 2001 - Installation in: Croatia
- 2002 - Installation in: Armenia Tajikistan, Azerbaijan
- 2004 - DoD program management selected new program management for PIMS at European Office of SPAWAR Systems Center Charleston, a US Navy Working Capital Fund.
- 2005-06 - Upgraded communications capabilities in PfP Partner countries; Enhanced Event Support IT/Communications capabilities; Institutionalized Collaborative Technology Platform at the PfP Consortium, PfP Training Centers, and among institutions of the NATO/PfP Education Training Network
- 2006 - Spring 2007 - Carry out R&D projects on Defense Planning and Strategy, Emergency Information Network as well as enhanced linkages among the NATO PfP Knowledge Network Sites.

== South-Eastern Europe Defense Ministerial ==
Southeastern Europe Defence Ministerial Process' (SEDM) main objective is strengthening understanding and politico-military cooperation in the region in order to enhance the stability and security in SEE. Southeastern Europe Defence Ministers gather regularly to discuss issues of security and cooperation in the region.

In October 2008 in Ohrid, Macedonia were discussed all the questions regarding regional security, stability and development of civil military relationships in all the countries in the region.

In October 2009, in Sofia, the Heads of Delegations signed the Agreement on the Coordination Committee in the Framework of Southeastern Europe Defence Ministerial Process and the 5th Additional Protocol to the Agreement on Multinational Peace Force of Southeastern Europe (MPFSEE) initiative. By signing this protocol, the nations expressed their approval of the updating of some essential parameters of the MPFSEE activities, including of the structure of the Southeastern Europe Brigade’s Headquarters (SEEBRIG HQ). Its adoption also resulted in the amendment of clauses of the Agreement concerning financial, logistic and organizational changes in SEEBRIG’s activities. The activities of the Southeastern Europe Brigade were also reviewed at the meeting, leading to the conclusion that the Brigade’s potential is greater than what has been employed so far. The Defence Ministers endorsed SEEBRIG’s annual plan and budget for 2010, as well as the financial framework and activities plan up to 2012. During Bulgaria's chairmanship, Serbia became a full member. The Process of Meetings of Southeast Europe Defence Ministers has a rotating two-year presidency.

- Macedonia (2007–2009)
- Bulgaria (2009–2011)
- Italy (2011-2013)

=== Membership ===
The following NATO members participate in SEDM:

- United States
- Albania
- Bulgaria
- Croatia
- Greece
- Italy
- Romania
- Slovenia
- Turkey

The following PfP members participate in SEDM:

- Bosnia and Herzegovina
- Macedonia
- Ukraine
- Montenegro
- Serbia

The following PfP members are observers to SEDM:

- Georgia
- Moldova (aiming to join as a full member)
