= Individual Partnership Action Plan =

Intergovernmental relations between countries and NATO

NATO and its partnerships in Europe: Members of NATO Membership Action Plan Intensified Dialogue / Individual Partnership Action Plan Other Partnership for Peace Aspiring Partnership for Peace members

Individual Partnership Action Plans (IPAP) are plans developed between NATO and different countries which outline the objectives and the communication framework for dialogue and cooperation between both parties. NATO launched the IPAPs initiative at the 2002 Prague Summit. In 2021, NATO established a new framework for relations with partner states, which it refers to as Individually Tailored Partnership Programmes (ITPP).

== Individually Tailored Partnership Programme (ITPP) ==
In March 2021, the North Atlantic Council agreed on establishing Individually Tailored Partnership Programmes (ITPP) as a new framework for cooperation with partner countries. This framework replaced both Individual Partnership Action Plans (IPAP) and Individual Partnership and Cooperation Programmes (IPCP) as NATO's primary tool used for coordination with partners. The main reason for the creation of ITPP was an effort to consolidate cooperation between NATO and non-member countries into a single agreement. ITPP operates on four-year cycles, after which the agreement can be potentially renewed.

As of April 2026, 18 countries are confirmed to have active ITPP agreements, while 6 countries are in the process of transitioning to an ITPP.

=== Countries with an active ITPP ===
- Australia
- Austria
- Bosnia and Herzegovina
- Colombia
- Georgia
- Ireland
- Japan
- Kazakhstan
- Kuwait
- Malta
- Mauritania
- Moldova
- Mongolia
- Morocco
- Qatar
- South Korea
- Switzerland
- Tunisia
- New Zealand

=== Countries in the process of transitioning to an ITPP ===
- Algeria
- Armenia
- Azerbaijan
- Bahrain
- Egypt
- Jordan
- Serbia

== Participation ==
Individual Partnership Action Plans (IPAPs) are in implementation with the following countries:

- Georgia (29 October 2004 - replaced by an ITPP)
- Azerbaijan (27 May 2005)
- Armenia (16 December 2005)
- Kazakhstan (31 January 2006 - replaced by an ITPP)
- Moldova (19 May 2006 - replaced by an ITPP)
- Bosnia and Herzegovina (10 September 2008 - replaced by an ITPP)
- Serbia (15 January 2015)

Armenia, Azerbaijan, Kazakhstan, Moldova and Serbia have stated they have no current intention to join NATO, but all of them participate in NATO's Partnership for Peace program. Georgia and Ukraine are currently undergoing Intensified Dialogue for NATO membership and Ukraine applied for membership in 2022, while Bosnia and Herzegovina has a Membership Action Plan and is actively working towards joining NATO.

Montenegro had an IPAP with NATO from 20 June 2008 until it acceded to NATO on 5 June 2017.

=== Ukraine ===
Ukraine's relationship with NATO is governed by the NATO–Ukraine Action Plan, adopted on 22 November 2002. In April 2005, Ukraine entered into Intensified Dialogue with NATO, and during the 2008 Bucharest summit NATO declared that Ukraine could become a member of NATO when it wants to join and meets the criteria for accession. However, under the foreign policy of new President Viktor Yanukovych in 2010, Ukraine announced that it no longer had NATO membership as a goal, and passed a law stipulating the country's non-aligned status. Following months of Euromaidan street protests that began because of his refusal to sign an Association Agreement with the European Union in favor of deals from Russia, President Yanukovych was overthrown. In response to the Annexation of Crimea by the Russian Federation and the deployment of Russian troops in eastern Ukraine in the War in Donbas, Ukrainian Prime Minister Yatsenyuk announced his intentions to resume the bid for NATO membership in August 2014. In December 2014, Ukraine's parliament voted to drop non-aligned status. On 30 September 2022, Ukraine formally applied to join NATO, following Russia's annexation of Southern and Eastern Ukraine.

== See also ==
- Balkan Pact
- Enlargement of NATO
- Euro-Atlantic Partnership Council
- Foreign relations of NATO
- Partnership for Peace
