= Member states of NATO =

NATO in 2026

The North Atlantic Treaty Organization (NATO) is an international military alliance consisting of 32 member states from Europe and North America. It was established at the signing of the North Atlantic Treaty on 4 April 1949. Of the 32 member countries, 30 are in Europe and 2 are in North America. Between 1994 and 1997, wider forums for regional cooperation between NATO and its neighbours were set up, including the Partnership for Peace, the Mediterranean Dialogue initiative, and the Euro-Atlantic Partnership Council. The majority of NATO members are also member states of the European Union.

All members have militaries, except for Iceland, which does not have a typical army (but it does have a coast guard and a small unit of civilian specialists for NATO operations). Three of NATO's members are nuclear weapons states: France, the United Kingdom, and the United States. NATO has 12 original founding member states. Three more members joined between 1952 and 1955, and a fourth (Spain) joined in 1982. Since the end of the Cold War, NATO has added 16 more members from 1999 to 2024. Article 5 of the treaty states that if an armed attack occurs against one of the member states, it shall be considered an attack against all members, and other members shall assist the attacked member, with armed forces if necessary. Article 6 of the treaty limits the scope of Article 5 to the islands north of the Tropic of Cancer, the North American and European mainlands, the entirety of Turkey, and French Algeria, the last of which has been moot since July 1962. Thus, an attack on Hawaii, Puerto Rico, French Guiana, the Falkland Islands, Ceuta or Melilla, among other places, would not trigger an Article 5 response.

NATO recognizes Bosnia and Herzegovina, Georgia, and Ukraine as aspiring members as part of their Open Door enlargement policy.

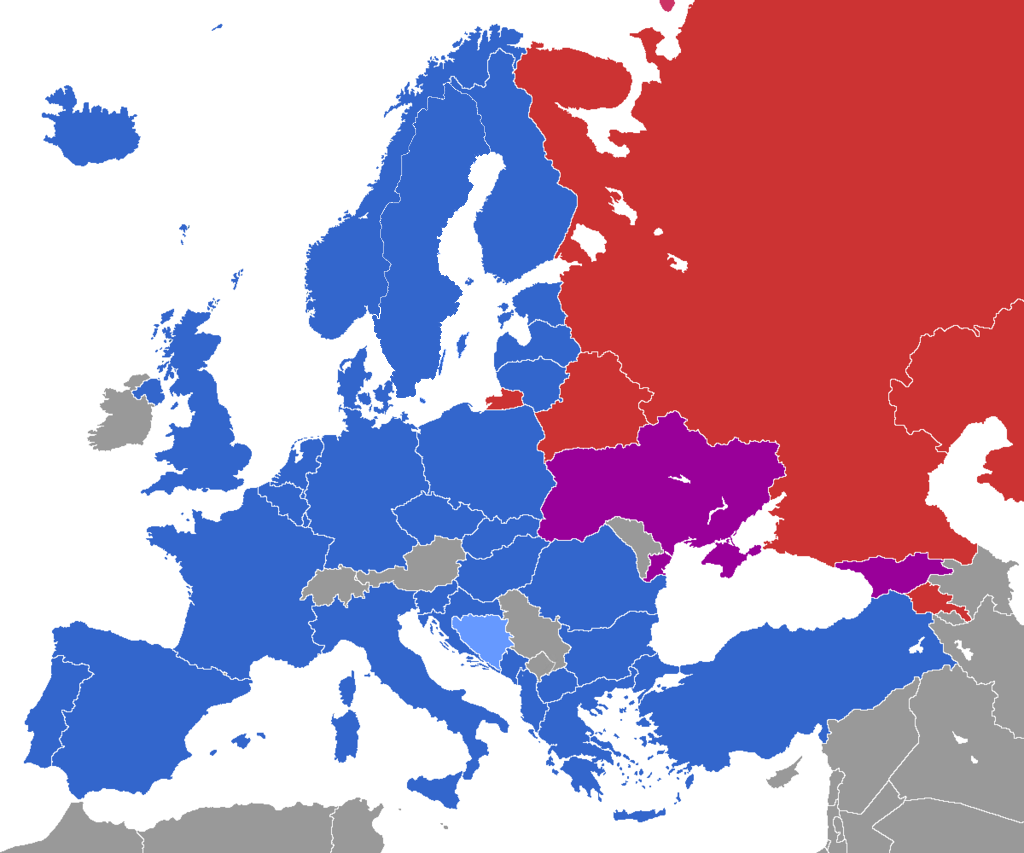
Map of NATO in Europe: Current members Membership Action Plan Countries seeking membership Countries where membership is not a goal Collective Security Treaty Organization (CSTO)

== Founding members and enlargement ==
NATO was established on 4 April 1949 via the signing of the North Atlantic Treaty (Washington Treaty). The 12 founding members of the Alliance were: Belgium, Canada, Denmark, France, Iceland, Italy, Luxembourg, the Netherlands, Norway, Portugal, the United Kingdom, and the United States.

The various allies all signed the Ottawa Agreement, which is a 1951 document that acts to embody civilian oversight of the Alliance.

Current membership consists of 32 countries. In addition to the 12 founding countries, four new members joined during the Cold War: Greece and Turkey (1952), West Germany (1955) and Spain (1982). Additionally, NATO experienced territorial expansion during this period without adding new member states when Zone A of the Free Territory of Trieste was annexed by Italy in 1954, and the territory of the former East Germany was added with the reunification of Germany in 1990. NATO further expanded after the Cold War, adding the Czech Republic, Hungary, and Poland (1999); Bulgaria, Estonia, Latvia, Lithuania, Romania, Slovakia, and Slovenia (2004); Albania and Croatia (2009); Montenegro (2017); North Macedonia (2020); Finland (2023); and Sweden (2024). Of the territories and members added between 1990 and 2024, all except for Finland and Sweden were either formerly part of the Warsaw Pact (including the formerly Soviet Baltic states) or territories of the former Yugoslavia. No countries have left NATO since its founding, although France withdrew from NATO unified command between 1966 and 2009.

Since the accession of Sweden on 7 March 2024, the North Atlantic Treaty Organization covers a total area of 27,580,492 km^{2} (10,648,887 sq mi).

== List of member states ==
The current members and their dates of admission are listed below.

List of member states of NATO
Flag	Map	Name	Capital	Largest city	Accession	Population	Area	Military budget as % GDP 2024	GDP 2025 (million US$)	Languages
		Albania	Tirana		1 April 2009	2,854,710	28,748 km^{2} (11,100 sq mi)	2.03	28,372	Albanian
		Belgium	City of Brussels	Brussels Capital Region	24 August 1949 (Note: Founding member of NATO.)	11,611,419	30,528 km^{2} (11,787 sq mi)	1.30	684,864	Dutch; French; German
		Bulgaria	Sofia		29 March 2004	6,885,868	110,879 km^{2} (42,811 sq mi)	2.18	117,007	Bulgarian
		Canada	Ottawa	Toronto	24 August 1949	41,798,407	9,984,670 km^{2} (3,855,103 sq mi)	1.37	2,225,341	English; French
		Croatia	Zagreb		1 April 2009	4,060,135	56,594 km^{2} (21,851 sq mi)	1.81	98,951	Croatian
		Czech Republic (Note: Officially referred to by the name Czechia. (See Czech Republic#Name.))	Prague		12 March 1999	10,510,751	78,867 km^{2} (30,451 sq mi)	2.10	360,244	Czech
		Denmark (Note: Including the Faroe Islands and Greenland.)	Copenhagen		24 August 1949	5,854,240	2,210,573 km^{2} (853,507 sq mi) (Note: including Faroe Islands and Greenland.)	2.37	449,940	Danish
		Estonia	Tallinn		29 March 2004	1,328,701	45,228 km^{2} (17,463 sq mi)	3.43	45,004	Estonian
		Finland	Helsinki		4 April 2023	5,619,399	338,455 km^{2} (130,678 sq mi)	2.41	303,945	Finnish; Swedish
		France (Note: Article 5 of the North Atlantic Treaty does not cover overseas territories of France apart from Saint Pierre and Miquelon.)	Paris		24 August 1949	64,531,444	643,427 km^{2} (248,429 sq mi)	2.06	3,211,292	French
		Germany (Note: Germany initially joined NATO as West Germany. The former country of East Germany became part of NATO after German reunification.)	Berlin		6 May 1955 (West Germany); 3 October 1990 (Germany)	83,408,554	357,022 km^{2} (137,847 sq mi)	2.12	4,744,804	German
		Greece	Athens		18 February 1952	10,445,365	131,957 km^{2} (50,949 sq mi)	3.08	267,348	Greek
		Hungary	Budapest		12 March 1999	9,709,786	93,028 km^{2} (35,918 sq mi)	2.11	237,070	Hungarian
		Iceland	Reykjavík		24 August 1949	370,335	103,000 km^{2} (39,769 sq mi)	0.0	35,309	Icelandic
		Italy	Rome		24 August 1949	59,240,329	301,340 km^{2} (116,348 sq mi)	1.49	2,422,855	Italian
		Latvia	Riga		29 March 2004	1,873,919	64,589 km^{2} (24,938 sq mi)	3.15	43,598	Latvian
		Lithuania	Vilnius		29 March 2004	2,786,651	65,300 km^{2} (25,212 sq mi)	2.85	89,192	Lithuanian
		Luxembourg	Luxembourg		24 August 1949	639,321	2,586 km^{2} (998 sq mi)	1.29	96,613	Luxembourgish; French; German
		Montenegro	Podgorica		5 June 2017	627,859	13,812 km^{2} (5,333 sq mi)	2.02	8,562	Montenegrin
		Netherlands (Note: Article 5 of the North Atlantic Treaty covers only the European part of The Netherlands.)	Amsterdam (Note: Seat of government located in The Hague.)		24 August 1949	17,501,696	41,543 km^{2} (16,040 sq mi) (Note: Figure includes the islands of Bonaire, Saba and Sint Eustatius, but they don't fall under the NATO treaty.)	2.05	1,272,011	Dutch
		North Macedonia	Skopje		27 March 2020	2,103,330	25,713 km^{2} (9,928 sq mi)	2.22	17,885	Macedonian
		Norway (Note: Article 5 of the North Atlantic Treaty does not cover Bouvet Island.)	Oslo		24 August 1949	5,403,021	385,207 km^{2} (148,729 sq mi) (Note: Including Jan Mayen, and Svalbard.)	2.20	504,276	Norwegian
		Poland	Warsaw		12 March 1999	38,307,726	312,685 km^{2} (120,728 sq mi)	4.12	979,960	Polish
		Portugal	Lisbon		24 August 1949	10,290,103	92,090 km^{2} (35,556 sq mi)	1.55	321,440	Portuguese
		Romania	Bucharest		29 March 2004	19,328,560	238,391 km^{2} (92,043 sq mi)	2.25	403,395	Romanian
		Slovakia	Bratislava		29 March 2004	5,447,622	49,035 km^{2} (18,933 sq mi)	2.0	147,031	Slovak
		Slovenia	Ljubljana		29 March 2004	2,119,410	20,273 km^{2} (7,827 sq mi)	1.29	75,224	Slovene
		Spain (Note: Excluding the Plazas de soberanía region.)	Madrid		30 May 1982	47,486,935	505,370 km^{2} (195,124 sq mi)	1.28	1,799,511	Spanish
		Sweden	Stockholm		7 March 2024	10,467,097	450,295 km^{2} (173,860 sq mi)	2.14	620,297	Swedish
		Turkey (Note: Officially referred to by the name Türkiye. (See Name of Turkey.))	Ankara	Istanbul	18 February 1952	84,775,404	783,562 km^{2} (302,535 sq mi)	2.09	1,437,406	Turkish
		United Kingdom (Note: Including Bermuda, Gibraltar, Guernsey, Isle of Man, and Jersey. Other overseas territories are not covered under Article 5.)	London		24 August 1949	67,281,039	243,610 km^{2} (94,058 sq mi)	2.33	3,839,180	English
		United States (Note: Article 5 of the North Atlantic Treaty covers neither Hawaii nor any of the US territories.)	Washington, D.C.	New York City	24 August 1949	336,997,624	9,833,520 km^{2} (3,796,743 sq mi)	3.38	30,507,217	English

=== Special arrangements ===
The three Nordic countries which joined NATO as founding members, Denmark, Iceland and Norway, chose to limit their participation in three areas: there would be no permanent peacetime bases, no nuclear warheads and no Allied military activity (unless invited) permitted on their territory. However, Denmark allowed the US to maintain an existing base, Thule Air Base (now Pituffik Space Base), in Greenland.

From the mid-1960s to the mid-1990s, France pursued a military strategy of independence from NATO under a policy dubbed "Gaullo-Mitterrandism". Nicolas Sarkozy negotiated the return of France to the integrated military command and the Defence Planning Committee in 2009, the latter being disbanded the following year. France remains the only NATO member outside the Nuclear Planning Group and unlike the United States and the United Kingdom, will not commit its nuclear-armed submarines to the alliance.

== Membership aspirations ==
As of June 2026, three additional states have formally informed NATO of their membership aspirations: Bosnia and Herzegovina, Georgia, and Ukraine.

- NATO members agreed at the 2008 Bucharest Summit that Georgia and Ukraine "will become members of NATO in the future".
- Bosnia and Herzegovina was invited by NATO to join the Membership Action Plan (MAP) in April 2010.

== Withdrawal ==
No state has ever withdrawn from NATO, but some dependencies of member states have not requested membership after becoming independent:

- Cyprus (independence from the United Kingdom in 1960)
- Algeria (independence from France in 1962)
- Malta (independence from the United Kingdom in 1964)

== Military personnel ==
The following list is constructed from The Military Balance, published annually by the International Institute for Strategic Studies.

Numbers of military personnel
Country	Active	Reserve	Paramilitary	Total	Per 1,000 capita		Ref.
Country	Active	Reserve	Paramilitary	Total	total	active	Ref.
Albania	5,350	2,100	2,150	9,600	3.1	1.7	
Belgium	23,500	5,900	0	29,400	2.5	2	
Bulgaria	36,950	3,000	0	39,950	5.9	5.4	
Canada	62,300	29,100	5,800	97,200	2.5	1.6	
Croatia	16,800	21,000	3,000	40,800	9.8	4	
Czech Republic	26,600	4,200	0	30,800	2.8	2.5	
Denmark	13,100	44,200	0	57,300	9.6	2.2	
Estonia	7,100	20,000	21,200	48,300	40.5	5.9	
Finland	23,850	233,000	2,900	259,750	46.2	4.2	
France	202,200	38,500	95,100	335,800	4.9	3	
Germany	179,850	34,100	0	213,950	2.5	2.1	
Greece	132,000	289,000	7,400	428,400	41	12.6	
Hungary	32,150	20,000	0	52,150	5.3	3.3	
Iceland	0	0	250	250	0.7	0	
Italy	161,850	14,500	178,600	354,950	5.8	2.7	(Note: The paramilitary forces of Italy consist of the Carabinieri and the Guardia di Finanza.)
Latvia	7,870	38,000	10,000	55,870	30	4.2	
Lithuania	16,100	12,950	18,400	47,450	18.1	6.1	
Luxembourg	900	0	600	1,500	2.2	1.3	
Montenegro	2,710	2,800	4,100	9,610	16	4.5	
Netherlands	33,650	6,350	6,500	46,500	2.6	1.9	
North Macedonia	8,000	4,850	7,600	20,450	9.6	3.7	
Norway	25,400	40,000	0	65,400	11.9	4.6	
Poland	164,100	37,500	14,300	215,900	5.6	4.2	
Portugal	21,500	23,500	22,600	67,600	6.6	2.1	
Romania	69,900	55,000	57,000	181,900	10	3.9	
Slovakia	12,800	0	0	12,800	2.3	2.3	
Slovenia	6,200	950	0	7,150	3.4	3	
Spain	122,200	13,800	80,500	216,500	4.6	2.6	
Sweden	14,850	21,500	0	36,350	3.4	1.4	
Turkey	355,200	378,700	160,800	894,700	10.6	4.2	
United Kingdom	141,100	70,450	0	211,550	3.1	2.1	
United States	1,315,600	797,200	0	2,112,800	6.2	3.8	
NATO	3,240,410	2,233,850	688,800	6,163,060	6.3	3.3	

== Military expenditures ==
Military spending of the US compared to 31 other NATO member countries (US$ millions). (Note: Country order is the same as the preceding chart (military personnel per 1,000 capita) to maintain the same country colours between charts.)
1. United States (59.4%)
2. All other NATO countries total (40.6%)
Total military spending of NATO member countries except the United States, and Sweden (US$ millions). (Note: The pie chart format does not allow as many slices as there are countries in NATO, so certain countries (Albania, Belgium, Czech Republic, Finland, Iceland and Luxembourg) have been combined into a single slice.)
1. Greece (1.75%)
2. Estonia (0.28%)
3. Portugal (0.99%)
4. Montenegro (0.03%)
5. Lithuania (0.51%)
6. Norway (2.05%)
7. Turkey (4.42%)
8. Latvia (0.25%)
9. Denmark (1.91%)
10. Croatia (0.34%)
11. North Macedonia (0.06%)
12. Romania (1.32%)
13. Hungary (1.01%)
14. Bulgaria (0.45%)
15. Italy (7.63%)
16. France (13.5%)
17. Poland (7.50%)
18. Spain (4.57%)
19. Slovenia (0.21%)
20. United Kingdom (18.0%)
21. Slovakia (0.62%)
22. Canada (6.56%)
23. Germany (17.3%)
24. Netherlands (3.85%)
25. Other (4.93%)
United States and Sweden omitted – see above

The defence spending of the United States is more than double the defence spending of all other NATO members combined. (Note that this is total U.S. defense spending, not spending specifically for NATO) Criticism of the fact that many member states were not contributing their fair share in accordance with the international agreement by then US president Donald Trump caused various reactions from American and European political figures, ranging from ridicule to panic. While NATO members have committed to spending at least 2% of their Gross Domestic Product (GDP) on defence, most of them did not meet that goal in 2026.

Total military budget of European NATO countries (excluding Turkey) as a percentage of US military budget. Chinese and Russian military spending included for comparison

Member state	Population (Note: Population data is based on a 2026 estimate by countrymeters.info)	GDP (nominal) ($billions) (Note: GDP, Defence expenditures and Personnel data is based on a 2026 estimate by nato.int)	Defence expenditure (US$)			Personnel
Member state	Population	GDP (nominal) ($billions)	Total ($millions)	% real GDP	Per capita	Personnel
Albania	2,872,849	29.89	598	2.00	157	6,600
Belgium	12,055,794	725.00	14,465	2.00	1,085	22,100
Bulgaria	6,670,476	128.97	2,755	2.14	317	26,600
Canada	40,086,114	2,282.50	45,562	2.00	1,051	70,900
Croatia	4,026,339	104.04	2,182	2.10	453	13,600
Czech Republic	10,745,564	388.03	7,819	2.01	574	29,100
Denmark	5,936,566	458.55	15,299	3.34	2,416	18,000
Estonia	1,301,740	47.42	1,623	3.42	909	7,800
Finland	5,712,138	316.95	9,095	2.87	1,497	27,700
France	67,065,327	3,367.43	68,905	2.05	940	201,700
Germany	83,982,479	5,042.75	120,747	2.39	1,257	182,300
Greece	10,186,705	282.57	7,871	2.79	651	104,100
Hungary	9,479,265	247.43	5,130	2.07	416	19,900
Iceland	355,437	38.34	—N/a	—N/a	—N/a	—N/a
Italy	60,775,803	2,549.38	51,197	2.01	798	193,700
Latvia	1,760,090	47.70	1,782	3.74	790	8,200
Lithuania	2,472,510	94.84	3,797	4.00	1.019	19,000
Luxembourg	711,892	66.20	1,408	2.13	1.750	1,000
Montenegro	632,886	9.18	188	2.05	235	1,700
Netherlands	17,494,438	1,329.13	30,498	2.59	1,618	45,100
North Macedonia	2,103,765	18.89	402	2.13	183	6,000
Norway	5,843,854	518.84	16,598	3.20	3,026	26,700
Poland	37,912,247	1031.96	44,360	4.30	891	252,900
Portugal	9,927,058	345.50	6,911	2.00	546	21,500
Romania	18,362,627	420.57	9,300	2.21	361	69,800
Slovakia	5,482,699	153.63	3,162	2.06	480	13,500
Slovenia	2,097,913	79.55	1,624	2.04	637	5,900
Spain	46,141,946	1,897.02	37,940	2.00	691	117,400
Sweden	10,603,412	663.33	16,601	2.50	1,531	25,700
Turkey	93,157,395	1,563.43	36,414	2.33	265	370,300
United Kingdom	70,422,211	4,020.45	92,875	2.31	1,146	126,100
United States	345,949,138	30,674.37	980,000	3.19	2,460	1,291,300
NATO	992,328,677	58,943.84	1,637,108	2.77	1,434	3,326,200

== Political and popular support ==
Pew Research Center's 2016 survey among its member states showed that while most countries viewed NATO positively, most NATO members preferred keeping their military spending the same. The response to whether their country should militarily aid another NATO country if it were to get into a serious military conflict with Russia was also mixed. Roughly half or fewer in six of the eight countries surveyed say their country should use military force if Russia attacks a neighboring country that is a NATO ally. And at least half in three of the eight NATO countries say that their government should not use military force in such circumstances. The strongest opposition to responding with armed force is in Germany (58%), followed by France (53%) and Italy (51%). More than half of Americans (56%) and Canadians (53%) are willing to respond to Russian military aggression against a fellow NATO country. A plurality of the British (49%) and Poles (48%) would also live up to their Article 5 commitment. The Spanish are divided on the issue: 48% support it, 47% oppose.

YouGov, a market research company that is mainly active in the UK also hosts a regularly updated public opinion polling for NATO. As of 6 January 2025, 45% of UK citizens strongly support NATO, 31% Tend to support NATO, 18% Don't know, 3% Tend to oppose and 3% Strongly oppose. Older people (65+) Strongly support NATO at 59%, whilst in younger demographics (18-24), Tend to support ranks the highest at 34%, and Don't know is at 33%.

A 2025 poll found that support for NATO membership was 52%, compared to the 66% of Slovenians who voted for NATO membership in a referendum in 2003.
