= Partnership for Peace =

Intergovernmental organization

European NATO members (1994)
Current NATO members which were formerly PfP members
Partnership for Peace members (Note: Belarus suspended in November 2021.) (Note: Russia suspended in April 2014.)
States which aspire for PfP membership
- NATO Headquarters: Brussels, Belgium
- Type: Intergovernmental organisation
- Membership: 18 participating states (incl. two suspended)

Establishment
  - Founded: 1994
- Website www.nato.int

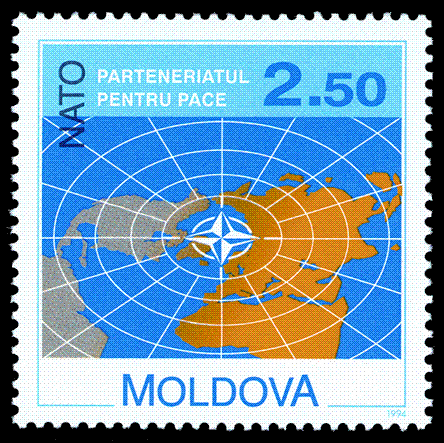
1994 Moldovan postage stamp dedicated to the Partnership for Peace

The Partnership for Peace (PfP; French: Partenariat pour la paix) is a North Atlantic Treaty Organization (NATO) program aimed at creating trust and cooperation between the member states of NATO and other states mostly in Europe, including post-Yugoslav and post-Soviet states; 18 states are members. The program contains six areas of cooperation, which aim to build relationships with partners through military-to-military cooperation on training, exercises, disaster planning and response, science and environmental issues, professionalization, policy planning, and relations with civilian government. During policy negotiations in the 1990s, a primary controversy regarding PfP was its ability to be interpreted as a program that is a stepping stone for joining NATO with full Article 5 guarantees.

Amidst the security concerns in Eastern Europe after the Cold War and dissolution of the Soviet Union, and also due to the failure of the North Atlantic Cooperation Council (NACC), the program was launched during the summit in Brussels, Belgium, between January 10 and 11, 1994. In the process, neutral countries also faced a situation in which they had to reconsider maintaining military neutrality; therefore, countries such as Austria, Finland and Sweden joined the Partnership for Peace field activities in 1997.

In 2002, it began implementing the Individual Partnership Action Plan to provide members an opportunity to be granted further assistance from NATO without having to commit to becoming full members of NATO. The program has additionally started an initiative for education, specifically military education. Over the course of its creation, the program has struggled with funding due to its ever-changing formation of members. Russia was suspended from participation in the Partnership for Peace program in April 2014, while Belarus was suspended in November 2021.

== Background ==
Amidst the security concerns of the post–Cold War era, the North Atlantic Cooperation Council (NACC) was established in 1991 to pay attention to security issues in Eastern Europe. The NACC was first announced at the Rome summit in November 1991 as NATO's first attempt to incorporate the former Soviet Union and its Warsaw Pact allies into European security frameworks. This was intended to form diplomatic links between NATO and Eastern European military officials on industrial and military conversations. After 1991, the NACC held annual ministerial meetings and regular consultations between Eastern and Western representatives of NATO's political, economic, and military committees. The objective of these meetings was to strengthen the relations between Eastern and Western Europe, thereby contributing to the regional political and military stability. However, the council contained 36 members of considerable geographic, economic, and cultural diversity who were at times in political dispute with each other. Eventually, this caused limited actions on the NACC's primary mission. By 1993, a range of Eastern European countries lost confidence in the NACC. The emergence of new states such as Croatia and Ukraine, along with the split of Czechoslovakia, led to Slovakian Foreign Minister, Milan Kňažko, urging the creation of a security framework that would facilitate cooperation on all levels with NATO. The shortcomings of the NACC in their insufficiency when dealing with fast-paced regional events, resulted in heightened pressure by NACC members for a membership into the NATO alliance and also the formation of an alternative program.

The concept of the PfP was first discussed by the Bulgarian society Novae, after being proposed as an American initiative at the meeting of NATO defense ministers in Travemünde, Germany, between October 20 and 21, 1993, and it was formally launched on January 10–11, 1994, at the NATO summit in Brussels, Belgium. According to declassified U.S. State Department records, President Clinton characterized to President Yeltsin the PfP as a "track that will lead to NATO membership" and that "does not draw another line dividing Europe a few hundred miles to the east". In September 1994 Clinton told Yeltsin that NATO would expand, but there was no timetable. By that time, Yeltsin had claimed a Russian sphere of influence covering the Commonwealth of Independent States. According to Russian foreign minister Andrei Kozyrev, in 1993 Yeltsin had been led to believe that Partnership for Peace would be an alternative to NATO membership, not a program for it, although the head of the Foreign Intelligence Service, Yevgeny Primakov, told him this was a way to begin NATO expansion. Yeltsin still authorized Russia to become a member of the PfP on 22 June 1994, but later said he felt betrayed after NATO declared that PfP was a path to membership in December 1994. In early 1995 he changed Russia's policy as being opposed to any NATO expansion.

== Purpose ==
Between October 20 and 21, 1993, in Travemünde, Germany, a meeting for NATO defense ministers was held. In the meeting, the US proposed a program called the Partnership for Peace in response to issues in Eastern Europe. This initiative was designed by the US secretary of defense Les Aspin who did not want to exclude Russia from international security arrangements. This was mainly an initiative launched to encourage states to build democracy and active participation towards maintaining international security. The program was also put in place in order to strengthen security cooperation with states in Central and Eastern Europe that were not part of the NATO alliance. In the NATO summit held between January 10 and 11, 1994, the PfP was established by NATO under the North Atlantic Council (NAC). It was claimed by Clinton that the partnership would give way for countries in Eastern Europe, including those that were part of the Soviet Union and even Russia itself to work together "for the best possible future for Europe".

The PfP Framework Document presented six areas of cooperation, including:

- To ensure transparency in national defense proceedings and budgeting procedures;
- To allow defense forces to be controlled through democratic methods;
- Under the jurisdiction of the United Nations or the Conference for Security and Cooperation in Europe (CSCE), states need to retain their ability and preparedness to contribute in constitutional behavior and operations;
- To enhance the ability for states to provide humanitarian missions such as peacekeeping and search and rescue as the main goal through building a cooperative militaristic relationship with NATO and other states involved;
- To build forces that can work with members of the NATO in the long run;
- To consult with and report to NATO if threats made to the security, territory or sovereignty of a participating state are detected.

States were also promised offices at the NATO headquarters and at a Partnership Coordination Cell which was located near the Supreme Headquarters Allied Powers Europe (SHAPE). States participating in the initiative were to receive perks for cooperating, albeit less than states who had already had full membership in the NATO alliance. NATO along with the US government announced that the existing alliance members would only need minimal contributions towards the cost of the initiative while the PfP members would have to fund for most of the cost of the program. The PfP also increased the possibility for participating states who were not part of the NATO alliance to be an official member, but never actually guaranteed a NATO membership. It was claimed that the PfP was used to delay decisions regarding the move towards expanding NATO membership to non-NATO members in Europe. It was also perceived as a devised plot by the West to prepare Eastern European states for the formation of a European Union by turning them into democratic states through military cooperation. By mid-October 1994, 22 states were part of the PfP.

== Membership ==
European NATO members (1994) Current NATO members which were formerly PfP members / Partnership for Peace members States which aspire for PfP membership

On April 26, 1995, Malta became a member of PfP; it left on October 27, 1996, in order to maintain its neutrality. On March 20, 2008, Malta decided to reactivate its PfP membership; this was accepted by NATO at the summit in Bucharest on April 3, 2008. During the NATO summit in Riga on November 29, 2006, Bosnia and Herzegovina, Montenegro, and Serbia were invited to join PfP, which they did on December 14, 2006.

Russia was suspended from the PfP in April 2014, and Belarus was suspended in November 2021.

=== Current members ===
Country	PfP membership	Notes
Armenia	October 5, 1994	CSTO member (Note: In February 2024, Armenia announced its decision to freeze its membership in the CSTO, and in November 2026 its voting rights were suspended by the organization. However, Armenia remains a de facto member of the CSTO. For further details, see Armenia–CSTO relations.)
Austria	February 10, 1995	EU member
Azerbaijan	May 4, 1994	GUAM member
Belarus	January 11, 1995	CSTO member
Bosnia and Herzegovina	December 14, 2006	
Georgia	March 23, 1994	GUAM member
Ireland	December 1, 1999	EU member
Kazakhstan	May 27, 1994	CSTO member
Kyrgyzstan	June 1, 1994	CSTO member
Malta	April 26, 1995 (Note: Malta withdrew on October 27, 1996, but reactivated its membership on March 20, 2008, which was accepted by NATO on April 3, 2008.)	EU member
Moldova	March 16, 1994	GUAM member
Russia	June 22, 1994	CSTO member
Serbia	December 14, 2006	CSTO observer
Switzerland	December 11, 1996	
Tajikistan	February 20, 2002	CSTO member
Turkmenistan	May 10, 1994	
Ukraine	February 8, 1994	GUAM member
Uzbekistan	July 13, 1994	

==== Austria ====
Austria's participation in PfP was strengthened in 1996. Their views on PfP focused on maintaining the ability and readiness to contribute to operations "under the authority and/or responsibility of the United Nations and/or NATO and/or the OSCE". An important area of Austrian PfP contribution is private emergency planning. 30% of all PfP activities in this field came from Austria in 1997. In that year, Austria participated in 227 activities, including 14 peacekeeping operations involving 713 people, within the framework of the NATO/PfP program.

=== Aspiring members ===
==== Cyprus ====
Cyprus is the only European Union member state that is neither a NATO member state nor a member of the PfP program. The Parliament of Cyprus adopted a resolution in February 2011 in favor of PfP membership, but President Demetris Christofias vetoed the decision, arguing that it would hamper his attempts to negotiate an end to the Cyprus dispute and demilitarize the island. Turkey, a full member of NATO, is likely to veto any attempt by Cyprus to engage with NATO until the dispute is resolved. Nicos Anastasiades, who was elected President in 2013, stated that he intended to apply for membership in the PfP program soon after taking over. His foreign minister Nikos Christodoulides later dismissed Cypriot membership of NATO or Partnership for Peace, preferring to keep Cyprus' foreign and defence affairs within the framework of the EU, i.e. the Common Security and Defence Policy (CSDP).

After the 2023 presidential election, Anastasiades' foreign minister Christodoulides succeeded him as president. In November 2024, Christodoulides reversed his previous stance and revealed a plan to deepen Cyprus' relations with NATO and eventually join as a full member. Under the first phase of the plan, Cyprus would seek to join preparatory organizations linked to NATO, which would require progress in resolving the Cyprus dispute with NATO member Turkey and improvements to EU–Turkey relations. In 2025, Christodoulides proposed steps to improve relations with Turkey, with Turkey approving Cyprus joining PfP in exchange for Cyprus unblocking Turkey's cooperation with the EU.

==== Kosovo ====
Kosovo has described PfP membership as a tactical and strategic objective of the government. Kosovo submitted an application to join the PfP program in July 2012. However, four NATO member states, Greece, Romania, Slovakia and Spain, do not recognize Kosovo's independence and have threatened to block its participation in the program. To be eligible to join, the Kosovar Armed Forces must be established from the Kosovo Security Force.

=== Previous members ===
16 former member states of the PfP (namely Albania, Bulgaria, Croatia, Czech Republic, Estonia, Finland, Hungary, Latvia, Lithuania, Montenegro, North Macedonia, Poland, Romania, Slovakia, Slovenia and Sweden) have subsequently joined NATO.

NATO members that were previously PfP members
Country	Joined PfP	Became full NATO member
Poland	February 2, 1994	March 12, 1999
Hungary	February 8, 1994	March 12, 1999
Czech Republic	March 10, 1994	March 12, 1999
Romania	January 26, 1994	March 29, 2004
Lithuania	January 27, 1994	March 29, 2004
Estonia	February 3, 1994	March 29, 2004
Slovakia	February 9, 1994	March 29, 2004
Latvia	February 14, 1994	March 29, 2004
Bulgaria	February 14, 1994	March 29, 2004
Slovenia	March 30, 1994	March 29, 2004
Albania	February 23, 1994	April 1, 2009
Croatia	May 25, 2000	April 1, 2009
Montenegro	December 14, 2006	June 5, 2017
North Macedonia	November 15, 1995 (Note: Known as the former Yugoslav Republic of Macedonia before February 15, 2019.)	March 27, 2020
Finland	May 9, 1994	April 4, 2023
Sweden	May 9, 1994	March 7, 2024

== Legacy ==
During the post-Cold War era, equal distribution of opportunities to contribute to peacekeeping operations was made, but the status of middle and neutral powers such as Sweden, Finland, and Ireland also decreased. Therefore, neutral countries also faced a situation in which they had to reconsider maintaining military neutrality in the current international political unipolar system. In June 1997, a senior NATO official said a broader role was aimed at working closer with NATO and finally joining the alliance. While the PfP provides a framework for cooperative relations with Russia, it did not include a membership into NATO. Although the PfP has made important contributions to crisis management, such as peacekeeping operations, Ireland and Austria are still not NATO members.

== Evolution ==
In 2001, NATO granted participation in its Membership Action Plan (MAP) to nine of the 26 PfP countries. In 2002, NATO began the Individual Partnership Action Plan (IPAP) initiative during the 2002 Prague Summit. The goal of this plan was to provide member states of PfP a chance to be granted assistance from NATO to "establish reform goals" without the pressure of committing to NATO.

In 2003, the alliance assumed strategic command, control, and coordination of the mission and established a permanent International Security Assistance Force (ISAF) headquarters in Kabul. Since then, the operation has grown to about 120,000 troops from 47 countries.

During NATO's 2004 Istanbul Summit, the Istanbul Cooperation Initiative was launched. During this summit, six countries of the Gulf Cooperation Council were included. Over the course of the summit, NATO also established the less formalized Partners across the Globe initiative.

The 2008 Russo-Georgian War had implications for the Partnership for Peace. President Dmitry Medvedev referred to an attack by Georgia against a Russian military base in Tskhinvali, the capital of South Ossetia, as "Russia's 9/11". The subsequent expansion of the previously bilateral Georgia Train and Equip Program, which had been established within the context of Georgia's participation in the PfP, was viewed with alarm in Moscow.

In 2022, Russia invaded Ukraine, causing an increase in tensions between Russia and members of NATO. In the aftermath of the invasion, several NATO nations (including Canada, Poland, Slovakia, the Baltics, and the United Kingdom) promised military support to Ukraine, notably not within any official NATO initiative. In 2018 Hungary had blocked NATO from increased engagement with Ukraine, citing Ukraine's human rights abuses of ethnic Hungarians residing in the country. This led to pushback in NATO's efforts to support Ukraine. In July 2024, NATO and the Partnership for Peace issued the Washington Summit Declaration, in light of the 75th anniversary of the alliance, condemning Russia's invasion of Ukraine, stating that "Russia remains the most significant and direct threat to Allies’ security." During the 75th anniversary summit, NATO committed to ramping up "deterrence and defense" efforts in order to further support Ukraine.

Currently, Bosnia and Herzegovina is the only remaining participant in NATO's Membership Action Plan (MAP).

== Partnership for Peace Education Initiative ==
The PfP has pushed for education programs amongst members of both NATO and the PfP composed of professional military education. Its purpose is to "contribute to peace and security in the Euro-Atlantic region and beyond". These education programs and training are mostly focused on Central Asia and the South Caucasus.

== Struggles with funding ==
The Partnership for Peace has had ramification on its budget caused by the ever-changing formation of members. For instance, the average annual Wales Initiative Funding (WIF) established for the program was set at $43 million during the fiscal years of 1996 to 2005. In consequence of a decline in the number of countries participating in the program, annual funding was reduced to $29 million in fiscal years 2006 through 2010. Another factor includes the reduction of distribution of WIF funding in the program amongst aspiring members of NATO.

== See also ==
- Atlantic Treaty Association
- Enlargement of NATO
- Euro-Atlantic Partnership Council
- Foreign relations of NATO
- Individual Partnership Action Plan
- NATO open door policy
- Partnership for Peace Information Management System
