= NATO open door policy =

Policy regarding the enlargement of NATO

In the context of the enlargement of NATO, Article 10 of the North Atlantic Treaty is the origin for the April 1999 statement of a "NATO open door policy". The open door policy requires a consensus in favour of countries applying to join NATO, as all member states must ratify the protocol enabling a new country to become a member of NATO. The open door policy "is aimed at promoting stability and cooperation".

== History ==
=== Post-Cold War enlargement of NATO ===
George W. Bush's March 2004 speech (mentions open door policy at 7:03)

Following the Eastern European Revolutions of 1989, countries from the former Eastern Bloc expressed their interest in joining NATO. During a March 1992 visit to Warsaw, NATO secretary general Manfred Wörner said that the "doors to NATO are open". During the December 1994 OSSE conference in Budapest, the United States and its NATO allies stated that no European countries should be prevented from joining the alliance.

According to Vladimir Putin, he had asked whether or not Russia could join NATO in 1999. He recounted in February 2024 that Bill Clinton answered him, "I’ve talked to my team. No, no, it’s not possible now."

On 12 March 1999, Poland, Hungary, and the Czech Republic joined NATO as the first former Eastern Bloc states, beginning the enlargement of NATO eastwards. When Estonia, Latvia, Lithuania, Bulgaria, Romania, Slovakia, and Slovenia joined on 29 March 2004, US president George W. Bush prepared for even further enlargement of the alliance. During the welcoming ceremony held the same day, he said:

The door to NATO will remain open until the whole of Europe is united in freedom and in peace

— George W. Bush, 29 March 2004

The April 2008 Bucharest Summit communiqué re-affirmed the NATO allies' "commitment to keeping NATO's door open to any European democracy willing and able to assume the responsibilities and obligations of membership, in accordance with Article 10 of the Washington Treaty." At that summit, Ukraine was invited to join the Alliance.

In a 5 December 2015 "Statement by NATO Foreign Ministers on Open Door Policy" Montenegro was invited to join the alliance, and the signatories encouraged "Georgia to continue making full use of all the opportunities for coming closer to the Alliance." They remained "committed to the Open Door Policy, a founding principle of the Washington Treaty" and encouraged "partners to continue to implement the necessary reforms and decisions to prepare for membership," while they would "continue to offer political and practical support to the efforts" of the partners.

At the end of November 2020, it became known that the NATO Summit in 2021 would consider a return to the open door policy, including the issue of providing Georgia with a Membership Action Plan (MAP).

On 9 February 2021, the prime minister of Ukraine, Denys Shmyhal, stated that he hoped that Ukraine would be able to receive an action plan for NATO membership at the same time as Georgia. In response, the NATO Secretary-General confirmed during Shmyhal's visit to Brussels that Ukraine is a candidate for NATO membership.

On 14 June 2021, a communiqué issued at 2021 Brussels summit reaffirmed commitment to the open door policy, as well as "all elements" of the decision made at the 2008 Bucharest Summit that Georgia and Ukraine will become members of NATO.

=== Russian invasion of Ukraine ===
On 7 January 2022, ahead of a bilateral meeting with Russia, NATO secretary general Jens Stoltenberg said that "Russia's unprovoked and unjustified military buildup in and around Ukraine" had serious implications for European security and stability and that Russian forces were only strengthening a noose around Ukraine. A Ukrainian official said at the time that "There should not be any compromise with Russia... They recognize only force. Weakness will provoke them... NATO must show that doors are open and promises kept." Stoltenberg said that "The Russian military buildup has not stopped. It continues and [is] gradually building up with more forces, more capabilities," whereupon he described armored units, artillery, combat-ready troops, electronic warfare equipment, and other military capabilities. Stoltenberg was clear that the alliance would not heed Russia's demand to withdraw the invitation for Ukraine and Georgia to join NATO—or for any country to pursue the path of its choosing.

On 28 January 2022, an op-ed was published by the New York University School of Law in which the author disclosed that in two drafts of a 2021 NATO-Russia treaty, "Moscow placed the onus of averting an expanded conflict in Ukraine on the West broadly, NATO particularly, and the United States specifically. Among other stipulations, Moscow insisted that NATO's open door to new members be shut."

In the wake of the Russian invasion of Ukraine on 24 February 2022, the leaders of the then-30 NATO member countries held a meeting on 24 March 2022, in Brussels and one result was a statement which read in part:

"Massive sanctions and heavy political costs have been imposed on Russia to bring an end to this war. We remain determined to maintain coordinated international pressure on Russia... We remain committed to the foundational principles underpinning European and global security, including that each nation has the right to choose its own security arrangements free from outside interference. We reaffirm our commitment to NATO's Open Door Policy under Article 10 of the Washington Treaty... We will continue to take all necessary steps to protect and defend the security of our Allied populations and every inch of Allied territory... We are also establishing four additional multinational battlegroups in Bulgaria, Hungary, Romania, and Slovakia... President Putin's choice to attack Ukraine is a strategic mistake, with grave consequences also for Russia and the Russian people."

In December 2025, US president Donald Trump released the National Security Strategy of his administration, which states that US wants to "end the perception, and preventing the reality, of NATO as a perpetually expanding alliance" and calls on Europe to "take primary responsibility for its own defense".

==== Turkey's opposition to Finnish and Swedish accession bids ====
In May 2022, Turkey announced that while fully supporting NATO's open door policy, it opposed the memberships of Finland and Sweden for allegedly supporting terrorism. On 18 May 2022, Turkey blocked the start of accession negotiations for Finland and Sweden to NATO. On 28 June 2022, during the NATO summit in Madrid, a tripartite memorandum was signed between Finland, Sweden and Turkey, paving the way for accession negotiations with Finland and Sweden to join NATO. On the same day, Turkey agreed to support the accession bids of Finland and Sweden to NATO. On 17 March 2023, Turkey withdrew its opposition to Finnish accession to NATO, enabling Finland to become the 31st NATO member state on 4 April 2023. On 10 July 2023, Turkey withdrew its opposition to Swedish accession to NATO, enabling Sweden to become the 32nd NATO member state on 7 March 2024.
