= 2021 Russian ultimatum to NATO =

Presented before Russian invasion of Ukraine

European NATO and CSTO member states at the time. Russian-led CSTO NATO member states in 2022 States affected by Russian occupation Russian-occupied territories

In December 2021, during the prelude to the Russian invasion of Ukraine, Russia issued a list of demands widely seen as an ultimatum to the North Atlantic Treaty Organization (NATO) and the United States. In January 2022, NATO refused the main demands, but offered to negotiate others. In February 2022, Russia invaded Ukraine.

Although NATO's eastward enlargement during the 1990s and 2000s had been accepted by Russia at the time, and Russia itself had joined NATO's Partnership for Peace program, Russian president Vladimir Putin became concerned with waning Russian influence in former Soviet republics such as Ukraine and the Baltic States, which were aligning themselves with the West economically and politically. Following Ukraine's 2014 revolution, Russia annexed Crimea and started a war in eastern Ukraine. This prompted NATO to end co-operation and to deploy a small tripwire force in the Baltic states and Poland.

On 15 December 2021, Russia issued a list of demands in the form of two draft treaties, one with NATO and another with the United States. The treaties included a proposed ban on Ukraine and other ex-Soviet countries ever joining NATO, and the withdrawal of NATO troops and weapons from its Central and Eastern European member states. The demands, made during a time of high tension, during which about 100,000 Russian troops were massed on Ukraine's borders, were widely seen as an ultimatum and an attempt by Russia to exert pressure on Western countries. Several Western political analysts suggested Russia was making unrealistic demands as a "smokescreen", knowing they would be rejected and giving Russia a pretext for invading Ukraine.

NATO and the United States issued their formal response to Russia on 26 January 2022. The alliance rejected Russia's demand to never let Ukraine join NATO, saying this would go against the right of countries to choose their security, which Russia had acknowledged in treaties. They rejected Russia's demand for NATO forces to be withdrawn from eastern members, calling on Russia to stop its build-up around Ukraine and to withdraw its occupying forces from Ukraine, Georgia, and Moldova. NATO and the US offered to improve transparency with Russia, and to negotiate limits on missiles and military exercises. The US proposed an agreement whereby Russia and the US would never station missiles or troops in Ukraine, and Russia would be allowed to inspect missile defense bases to confirm they are not a threat. Russia replied that its key demands had been ignored, and the Russian invasion of Ukraine followed less than a month later on 24 February.

== Background ==
=== Cold War ===
After World War II, the Soviet Union established the Warsaw Pact: while the Pact was nominally a defensive alliance, in practice it functioned to safeguard the Soviet Union's hegemony over its Eastern European satellites. Effectively, the Pact was a direct reflection of the Soviet Union's authoritarianism and undisputed domination over the Eastern Bloc, in the context of the so-called Soviet Empire. The Pact's only direct military actions were invasions of its own member states to keep them from breaking away, as per the Brezhnev Doctrine, which allowed only limited independence of the satellite states' communist parties so that they would not compromise the cohesiveness of the Eastern Bloc. Decisions in the Warsaw Pact were ultimately taken by the Soviet Union alone; the member states were not equally able to negotiate their entry in the Pact nor the decisions taken. By contrast, in the North Atlantic Treaty Organization (NATO), a military alliance including the United States and its allies in Europe, all decisions required unanimous consensus in the North Atlantic Council despite US influence (mainly military and economic) over NATO. The entry of countries into the NATO alliance was not subject to domination but rather a democratic process.

=== NATO enlargement and rapprochement with Russia ===
Following the end of the Cold War in 1991, including the disbanding of Warsaw Pact and the dissolution of the Soviet Union, NATO began to accept new members in Central and Eastern Europe, eventually incorporating all former Pact countries as well as several former republics of the Soviet Union. Russian military actions, including the First Chechen War, were among the factors driving these countries, particularly those with memories of similar Soviet offensives, to push for NATO membership to ensure their long-term security.

In 1994, Russia joined NATO's Partnership for Peace program to facilitate cooperation and better relations with NATO, and signed the Budapest Memorandum on Security Assurances, pledging to protect Ukraine's sovereignty and territorial integrity in exchange for Ukraine giving up its nuclear weapons. In 1996, Russia joined the Council of Europe as well. The following year, in 1997, NATO and Russia signed the Founding Act on Mutual Relations, Cooperation and Security, which stated, among other things, that Russia and NATO "do not consider each other as adversaries".

=== End of friendly NATO-Russia relations ===
Despite this, NATO enlargement became a point of contention for Russia, particularly under Vladimir Putin, who asserted that it was a breach of assurances made by Western leaders in the early 1990s, and was meant to encircle Russia and undermine its security. Although Putin has called NATO enlargement a threat, Putin was actually more concerned about the loss of Russia's perceived sphere of influence in former Soviet republics, which were aligning themselves with the West economically and politically. Putin aimed to regain control of these republics as part of re-establishing Russia as a "great power".

Putin has aimed to sow division within NATO, by establishing relationships with NATO members Hungary and Turkey. With numerous Western European countries dependent on Russia for energy, particularly Germany which was a major benefactor of the Nord Stream 2 pipeline, Putin believed that NATO was too divided and would not stand in his way.

=== Russian failure to dominate Ukraine ===
Putin attempted to install a pro-Russian government in Ukraine in 2004, poisoning pro-Western presidential candidate Viktor Yushchenko, but this backfired due to the Orange Revolution. While Putin's effort succeeded in 2010, the massive Euromaidan protests in 2013–2014 forced pro-Russian Ukrainian president Viktor Yanukovych into exile. The annexation of Crimea by Russia in 2014 and subsequent war in the Donbas marked the start of the Russo-Ukrainian War, leading to diplomatic fallout and the imposition of economic sanctions by Western nations.

=== Prelude to full-scale invasion of Ukraine ===
On 12 July 2021, Russian President Vladimir Putin published his essay "On the Historical Unity of Russians and Ukrainians", which openly questioned Ukrainian territorial integrity and claimed that it was a "product of the Soviet era" formed "on the lands of historical Russia". A Kremlin-affiliated outlet described the essay as his "final ultimatum to Ukraine".

Starting in 2021, Russian units that were meant to defend Russia's western borders were withdrawn from the land borders with NATO, to prepare to invade Ukraine. Russia began a military build-up along its border with Ukraine, massing about 100,000 troops by December. The build-up was seen as a show of strength, and as a pressure tactic aimed at forcing Western concessions.

In November 2021, Russian president Putin warned that he would not tolerate a NATO missile defense shield (to shoot down attacking missiles) ever being deployed in Ukraine. He said that Aegis Ashore interceptors, like those based in Romania and Poland, could be secretly converted to launch Tomahawk missiles that could reach Moscow within minutes. However, there were no such plans to deploy a missile shield in Ukraine. The US secretary of state, Antony Blinken, replied "it's Russia that has developed ground-launched, intermediate-range missiles that can reach Germany and nearly all NATO European territory, despite Russia being a party to the INF Treaty that prohibited these missiles". He added that "Russia's violation led to the termination of that treaty" by the first Trump administration.

US intelligence also uncovered Russian false flag operations and disinformation campaigns in occupied Donbas that aimed to create a justification for the invasion in January and early February 2022. Putin had framed Ukraine as a threat, claiming it was about to attack Russia and Russian-occupied territories, even though the Kremlin had assessed Ukraine’s military capabilities and will to fight to be so weak that Russian forces would overrun the country in days.

== Ultimatum ==
On 15 December 2021, Putin submitted "specific proposals" on Russia's demands for security guarantees from the West to US Assistant Secretary of State Karen Donfried. Two days later, on 17 December, the Russian Ministry of Foreign Affairs published the demands in the form of two draft treaties with NATO and the US, proposing limits on their influence and activities in Europe. Russian Deputy Foreign Minister Sergei Ryabkov said that "The line pursued by the United States and NATO over recent years to aggressively escalate the security situation is absolutely unacceptable and extremely dangerous". Ryabkov also said that Russia was ready to begin negotiations as soon as 18 December, and suggested Geneva as a possible venue.

The first draft treaty, titled "Agreement on Measures to Ensure the Security of the Russian Federation and Member States of the North Atlantic Treaty Organization", included the following provisions, among others:

- that NATO members commit to no further enlargement of the alliance, including in particular to Ukraine
- that NATO deploy no forces or weapons in countries that joined the alliance after May 1997 (Note: Czech Republic, Hungary, Poland, Bulgaria, Estonia, Latvia, Lithuania, Romania, Slovakia, Slovenia, Albania, Croatia, Montenegro, and North Macedonia.)
- a ban on deployment of intermediate-range missiles in areas where they could reach the other side's territory
- a ban on any NATO military activity in Ukraine, Eastern Europe, the Caucasus, or Central Asia
- consultative mechanisms, such as the NATO–Russia Council, and on the establishment of a hotline

The second, titled "Treaty between the United States of America and the Russian Federation on Security Guarantees", included the following:

- a requirement that both countries "not implement security measures ... that could undermine core security interests of the other Party"
- a requirement that the United States undertake to prevent further NATO enlargement
- a ban on deployment of US intermediate-range missiles in Europe
- limits on heavy bombers and warships operating in international waters within range of the other side
- a requirement that both side's nuclear weapons only be deployed on national territory

== Reception ==
Some of the demands had already been ruled-out by NATO. The main demand from Russia to ban NATO from accepting new members was rejected by NATO and the US, who said that Russia should not have a veto on the alliance's enlargement and that it had the right to decide its own military posture, defending its open door policy as a fundamental principle of the organization. In response to the draft treaties, NATO Secretary General Jens Stoltenberg said that any dialogue with Russia "would also need to address NATO's concerns about Russia's actions, be based on core principles and documents of European security, and take place in consultation with NATO's European partners, such as Ukraine". US National Security Adviser Jake Sullivan said that the US was committed to the "principle of nothing about you without you" in shaping its foreign policy in Europe. A senior Biden administration official said the US was willing to discuss the proposals, but added that there were some "that the Russians know are unacceptable". Ukraine's Ministry of Foreign Affairs said that Ukraine had an "exclusive sovereign right" to decide its foreign policy, and only it and NATO could determine the relationship between them, including the question of its potential membership.

Some Western political analysts suggested Russia was knowingly making unrealistic demands as a diplomatic distraction, while maintaining military pressure on Ukraine and preparing to invade. They believe that Russia knew the demands would be rejected, and would use this rejection as a pretext for invading Ukraine.Michael Kofman calling the draft treaties a "smokescreen" and Sam Greene calling them a "declaration" rather than a basis for negotiation.

Russia's foreign minister Sergei Lavrov warned "If there is no constructive response within a reasonable time and the West continues its aggressive line, then Russia will be forced to [...] eliminate unacceptable threats to our security". Boris Bondarev, a Russian diplomat who later resigned in protest of Russia's invasion of Ukraine, recalled that the draft treaties had shocked many Russian diplomats and that he saw the demands as non-negotiable. According to Bondarev, during US–Russia talks in Geneva on 10 January 2022, Ryabkov had screamed at US officials, including Deputy Secretary of State Wendy Sherman, shouting "We [Russia] need Ukraine! We won't go anywhere without Ukraine! Take all your stuff and go back to the 1997 [NATO] borders!".

=== NATO and US counterproposals ===
According to The New York Times, high-level US officials held more than 180 meetings with their European counterparts in the weeks after the Russian demands. The NATO and US responses to the proposals were drafted together, and approved by US President Joe Biden and Ukraine.

On 26 January 2022, NATO and the US issued their formal response to Russia; the document was later published by El País. They said "Considering the substantial, unprovoked, unjustified, and ongoing Russian military build-up in and around Ukraine and in Belarus, we call on Russia to immediately de-escalate". In their response, they rejected Russia's demand to bar Ukraine from ever joining NATO, saying this would go against its "open-door policy" and the right of countries to choose their own security. They pointed out that Russia had signed agreements affirming the right of Ukraine and other countries to join military alliances. They rejected the demand for NATO forces to be withdrawn from Eastern Europe. A small NATO tripwire force had been deployed in the Baltic states and Poland, at the request of those countries, in response to the 2014 Russian annexation of Crimea. They called on Russia to withdraw its occupying forces from Ukraine, Georgia, and Moldova.

The United States proposed an agreement whereby Russia and the US would never station missiles or troops in Ukraine. To address Russia's concerns about the NATO missile defense system, the US offered to discuss a transparency mechanism; letting Russia inspect the bases to confirm they are not a threat, in exchange for the US being allowed to inspect two missile bases in Russia. Other planned areas for negotiation were a potential revival of the Intermediate-Range Nuclear Forces Treaty, and new mutual rules limiting the size and locations of military exercises.

Despite this initial rejection of Russia's ultimatum, by early February, the US was reportedly offering to prevent Ukraine joining NATO in future, if Russia backed away from the imminent invasion.

=== Russian response to NATO counterproposals ===
Alexander Gabuev, director of the Carnegie Russia Eurasia Center, later recalled that Russian diplomats were "pleasantly" surprised with the counterproposals and believed they could achieve agreements which would strengthen Russian security; but they said the Kremlin was uninterested.

Russia refused to negotiate and did not withdraw its troops from Ukraine's borders. Putin replied to the counterproposals on 1 February, saying "Russia's fundamental concerns have been ignored". On 17 February, the Russian foreign ministry published a response in which it said that the NATO and US proposals were not "constructive" and that both parties continued to ignore Russia's "red lines and core security interests", and warned that Russia would be forced to respond through unspecified "military-technical measures". One week later, on 24 February, Russia launched a full-scale invasion of Ukraine.

== See also ==
- Soviet ultimatum to Estonia
- Soviet ultimatum to Lithuania
- Soviet ultimatum to Romania
