= Russia–NATO relations =

- NATO: Russia

Relations between the NATO military alliance and the Russian Federation were established in 1991 within the framework of the North Atlantic Cooperation Council. The Russian Federation and NATO have bordered each other from the outset. Co-operation grew during the 1990s and early 2000s. Russia joined the Partnership for Peace program in 1994. The NATO–Russia Founding Act was signed in 1997, creating the NATO–Russia Permanent Joint Council (PJC) through which they consulted each other and worked together on security issues. This was replaced in 2002 by the NATO–Russia Council. During this period, there were suggestions of Russia becoming a NATO member. However, relations have become hostile, largely due to Russia's attacks on Ukraine since 2014.

Relations took a downturn during the 2nd term of Russian president Vladimir Putin, following the 2005 Orange Revolution in Ukraine. In his 2007 Munich speech, Putin condemned the eastward enlargement of NATO, and in 2008 Russia invaded Georgia. Relations worsened in 2014, when Russia annexed Crimea and invaded eastern Ukraine, starting the war in Donbas. NATO responded by suspending co-operation, and many member states imposed sanctions on Russia. To deter further Russian aggression, a small NATO tripwire force was deployed in the Baltic states and Poland, at the request of those countries. Some political analysts see this as the beginning of a Second Cold War. Over the following years there was a rise in military incidents, while Russia repeatedly probed NATO defenses and carried out covert assassinations in NATO countries. A few NATO members began helping Ukraine's military of their own accord.

In 2021, Russia amassed troops on Ukraine's borders. That October, NATO expelled eight Russian officials from its headquarters for alleged spying; in retaliation, Russia suspended its mission to NATO and ordered the closure of the NATO office in Moscow. Putin falsely claimed that NATO was building up military infrastructure in Ukraine and would attack Russia. That December, Russia issued far-reaching demands to NATO, including a withdrawal of NATO forces from Eastern Europe. The alliance rejected some demands but offered to negotiate others if Russia stopped its military buildup. Some Western analysts suggested Putin was using NATO as an excuse for Russian expansionism.

Russia invaded Ukraine in February 2022, starting the largest war in Europe since World War II and causing a breakdown of NATO-Russia relations. At the 2022 NATO summit, the alliance declared Russia "a direct threat to Euro-Atlantic security" and announced it was bolstering its defenses on its eastern borders. Many NATO member states imposed further sanctions on Russia and sent military aid to Ukraine.

Since the invasion of Ukraine, tensions between the two have escalated into Russian hybrid warfare against NATO member states, which includes sabotage, assassination plots, airspace violations, weaponized migration, cyberattacks, and disinformation aimed at destabilizing the alliance and disrupting aid to Ukraine.

== Background ==
NATO and the Warsaw Pact in 1989

Following the Treaty on the Final Settlement with Respect to Germany which dissolved the Allied Control Council and the Council of Foreign Ministers, NATO and the Soviet Union began to engage in talks on several levels, including a continued push for arms control treaties such as the Treaty on Conventional Armed Forces in Europe. There were also conversations regarding the NATO's role in the changing security landscape in Europe, with U.S. President George H. W. Bush, U.S. secretary of state James Baker, West German chancellor Helmut Kohl, West German foreign minister Hans-Dietrich Genscher, and Douglas Hurd, the British foreign minister. The West German foreign minister, Hans-Dietrich Genscher, in a meeting on 6 February 1990, suggested the alliance should issue a public statement saying that, "NATO does not intend to expand its territory to the East." In 1990–91, Western policy makers did indeed operate on a premise that NATO had no purpose in expanding to Eastern Europe, and that such a move would badly hurt long-term prospects for stability and security in the Soviet Union and Eastern Europe. According to several news reports and memoirs of politicians, in 1990, during negotiations about German reunification, the administration of then-US president George H. W. Bush made a 'categorical assurance' to the then-President of the Soviet Union, Mikhail Gorbachev: If Gorbachev agreed that a reunified Germany was part of NATO, then NATO would not enlarge further east to incorporate the Warsaw Pact countries in the alliance. The rationale was to allow for 'a non-aligned buffer zone' between the Soviet border and that of the NATO states. After the fall of the Soviet Union and the dissolution of the Warsaw Pact, Gorbachev denied those claims and stated that the promise from NATO not to enlarge eastward is a myth. He also said, "The decision for the U.S. and its allies to expand NATO into the east was decisively made in 1993. I called this a big mistake from the very beginning. It was definitely a violation of the spirit of the statements and assurances made to us in 1990." In 1992, i.e. only a few months after the USSR disintegrated, the US openly expressed intention to invite former Warsaw Pact countries into NATO.

== Growth of post-Cold War cooperation (1990–2004) ==
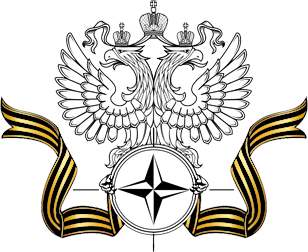
Coat of arms of the Permanent Mission of Russia to NATO

Soviet Foreign Minister Eduard Shevardnadze made a first visit to NATO headquarters on 19 December 1989, followed by informal talks in 1990 between NATO and Soviet military leaders. In June 1990 the Message from Turnberry, often described as "the first step in the evolution of [modern] NATO-Russia relations", laid the foundation for future peace and cooperation. In July 1990, NATO secretary-general Manfred Wörner visited Moscow to discuss future cooperation. In November 1990, the Soviet Union and NATO states signed the Treaty on Conventional Armed Forces in Europe.

Formal contacts and cooperation between the newly founded Russian Federation and NATO began following the dissolution of the Soviet Union in 1991, within the framework of the North Atlantic Cooperation Council (later renamed Euro-Atlantic Partnership Council), and were further deepened as Russia joined the Partnership for Peace program on 22 June 1994.

In September 1994, Yeltsin addressed the UN General Assembly and mentioned the role of the Conference on Security and Co-operation in Europe (CSCE) in European security. Russia had previously proposed increasing the role of the CSCE to the detriment of NATO. Yeltsin's national security aide Yuri Baturin noted that after the end of the Cold War, "the time of NATO has passed," and therefore the alliance "should change its mechanisms and goals taking into account Russia's military and political weight". Baturin believed that "a new mechanism of European security could be born from the combination of the CSCE and NATO, where the CSCE bodies would represent the political and diplomatic part, and NATO bodies would represent the military part". But Yeltsin himself did not make such a statement.

Yeltsin had thought that the Partnership for Peace would be an alternative to NATO membership rather than a path to it, and after it was announced in December 1994 by NATO that this is not the case, he began to oppose eastward NATO enlargement. Yeltsin adopted opposition to NATO enlargement as official policy in 1995. However, he continued efforts to cooperate with NATO. In May 1995, after a visit by Clinton to Moscow during Russia's Victory Day celebration, Yeltsin believed Clinton would help his reelection campaign in 1996, which was his main concern. He then authorized Andrei Kozyrev to sign Russia's country cooperation program within the PfP.

=== NATO-Russia mission in Bosnia ===
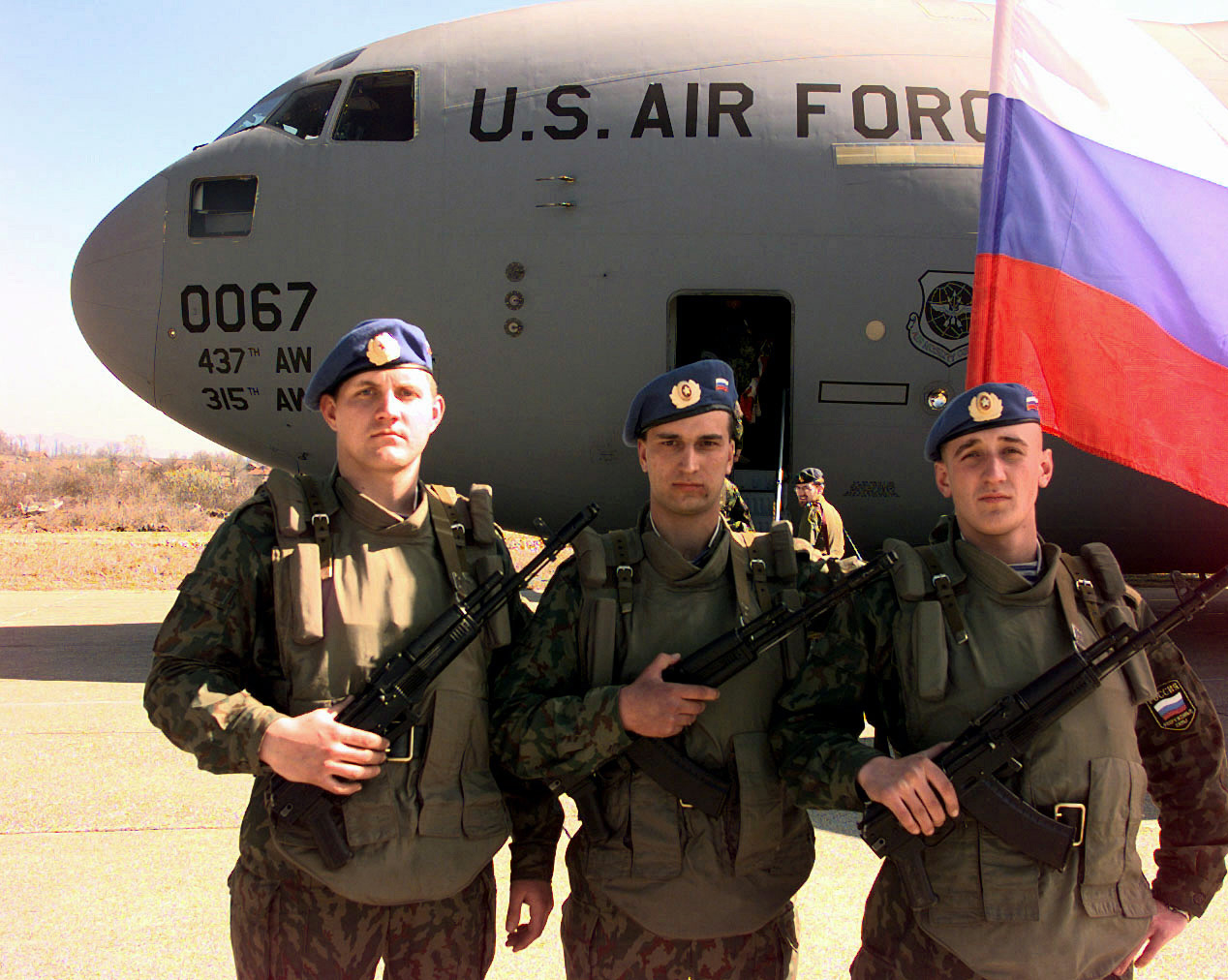
Russian paratroopers in Bosnia as part of the NATO-led SFOR, 6 March 1997

In late 1995 the U.S. and Russia reached an agreement for the Russian military to participate in the Implementation Force, the NATO peacekeeping mission in Bosnia and Herzegovina tasked with ensuring the implementation of the Dayton Agreement that ended the Bosnian War. On 15 October 1995, a Russian General Staff delegation arrived at the Supreme Headquarters Allied Powers Europe (SHAPE) in Mons, Belgium, and made the command and control arrangements for the deployment of Russian troops. A Russian general and his staff were appointed to SHAPE, with the general being given the position of Deputy to the Supreme Allied Commander Europe (SACEUR) for Russian Forces. A brigade of the Russian Airborne Forces was put together for the mission and was under the tactical control of Multi-National Division (North), led by a U.S. general, and under the operational command of SACEUR through his Deputy for Russian Forces. It was the first time the Russian military participated in a NATO operation and the first joint military operation between Russia and the countries of NATO since World War II.

The Russian involvement in Bosnia and the presence of a Russian military staff at NATO's headquarters was praised by both sides as a success, and General George Joulwan, the NATO supreme commander at the time, said that this contributed to the signing of the NATO-Russia Founding Act the following year.

=== NATO-Russia Founding Act and Permanent Joint Council ===
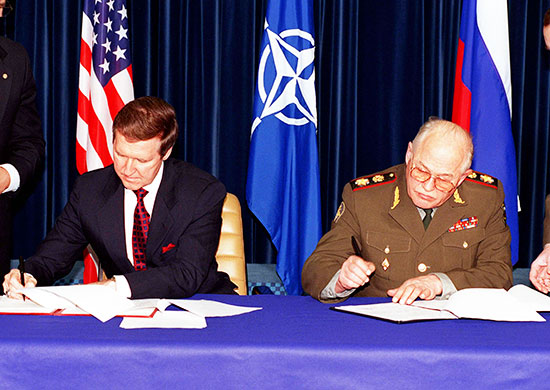
William Cohen and Igor Sergeyev signing a cooperation agreement at NATO HQ, 1997

On 27 May 1997, at the NATO Summit in Paris, NATO leaders and Russian president Boris Yeltsin signed the "Founding Act on Mutual Relations, Cooperation and Security" (NATO-Russia Founding Act), a road map for NATO-Russia cooperation. The act had five main sections, outlining the principles of the relationship, the range of issues on which NATO and Russia would work together, the military dimensions of the relationship, and the ways to foster greater military-military cooperation.

Yeltsin said the agreement would "protect Europe and the world from a new confrontation and will become the foundation for a new, fair a stable partnership". United States National Security Adviser Sandy Berger called it a "win-win agreement" and said it showed that "a new NATO would work with a new Russia to build a new Europe". Though Yeltsin called NATO enlargement a mistake, he said "the negative consequences of NATO's enlargement will be reduced to the minimum through the NATO–Russia deal".

The Founding Act affirms that "NATO and Russia do not consider each other as adversaries", and that they "will build together a lasting and inclusive peace in the Euro-Atlantic area on the principles of democracy and cooperative security". It acknowledges that "NATO has expanded and will continue to expand its political functions". The Founding Act states that NATO has "no intention, no plan and no reason" to station nuclear weapons on the territory of new member states; meaning new NATO members cannot participate in the alliance's nuclear weapons sharing.

The Act established a forum called the "NATO-Russia Permanent Joint Council" (PJC) for bilateral NATO-Russia discussions, consultations, cooperation and consensus-building. This gave Russia a voice in NATO, but not a veto over its internal affairs; likewise, NATO could not veto any actions of Russia. Russia's Permanent Mission to NATO was set up in Brussels, including the office of Russia's Chief Military Representative to NATO.

As part of the efforts of the PJC, the NATO-Russia Glossary of Contemporary Political and Military Terms was created in 2001. The glossary was the first of several such publications on topics such as missile defense, demilitarization, and countering illicit drugs to encourage transparency in NATO-Russia Relations, foster mutual understanding, and facilitate communication between NATO and Russia contingents. The Glossary of Contemporary Political and Military Terms was especially timely given the NATO and Russia cooperative efforts in Bosnia and Herzegovina and Kosovo.

Some analysts have argued that since the 2014 Russian annexation of Crimea the Founding Act has been a "dead letter".

=== NATO bombing of Yugoslavia ===
In 1999, Russia condemned the NATO bombing of Yugoslavia, which was done without a prior authorization by the United Nations Security Council, required by the international law. For many in Moscow, a combination of NATO's incorporation of Eastern Europe and its military attack on sovereign Yugoslavia exposed American promises of Russia's inclusion into a new European security architecture as a deceit. Yeltsin's critics said: 'Belgrade today, Moscow tomorrow!'

Russian president Boris Yeltsin said that NATO's bombing of Yugoslavia "has trampled upon the foundations of international law and the United Nations charter." The Kosovo War ended on 11 June 1999, and a joint NATO-Russian peacekeeping force was to be installed in Kosovo. Russia had expected to receive a peacekeeping sector independent of NATO, and was angered when this was refused. There was concern that a separate Russian sector might lead to a partition of Kosovo between a Serb-controlled north and Albanian south. From 12 to 26 June 1999, there was a brief but tense stand-off between NATO and the Russian Kosovo Force in which Russian troops occupied the Pristina International Airport.

=== 11 September attacks, US withdrawal from ABM Treaty ===
In 2001, following the September 11 attacks against the United States, Russian president Vladimir Putin reached out to President George W. Bush, the President of the United States at the time. This was the height of U.S.-Russian relations since the end of the Cold War. Russia even shared intelligence that they had with the United States, which proved vital to the U.S. forces in Afghanistan. As a member of NATO, the United States' newly positive relationship with Russia would positively impact Russian-NATO relations.

The US unilaterally withdrew from the Anti-Ballistic Missile Treaty with Russia in 2001–2002. This treaty had greatly limited each country's ABM systems, which are used to shoot down long-range attacking missiles. The US withdrew so it could build new ABM systems to shield NATO from missiles launched by Iran and "rogue states". The US signed bilateral agreements with Poland and Romania (with NATO support) to build ballistic missile defense (BMD) systems in their territories, against Russian wishes. None of this depended on NATO enlargement; the US also has BMD agreements with many non-NATO members (including Bahrain, Egypt, Israel, Japan, Kuwait, Saudi Arabia, South Korea, Taiwan, and the United Arab Emirates). This withdrawal was interpreted by the Russian political elite, and by many Western political scientists, as US exploitation of political and military weakness in Russia at the time. Some analysts say it led to the loss of Russia's trust in America's intentions.

=== NATO-Russia Council ===
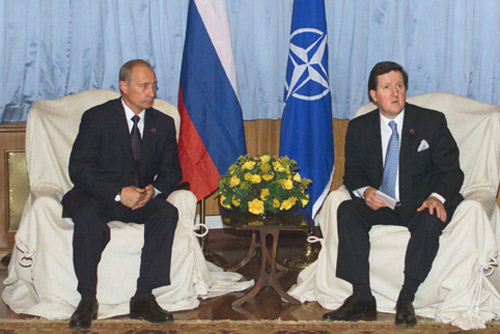
Russian president Vladimir Putin and NATO secretary-general George Robertson at the Russia-NATO Summit at Pratica di Mare Air Base in Italy on 28 May 2002

The NATO-Russia Council (NRC) was created on 28 May 2002 during the 2002 NATO Summit in Rome. The NRC was designed to replace the PJC as the official diplomatic tool for handling security issues and joint projects between NATO and Russia. The structure of the NRC provided that the individual member states and Russia were each equal partners and would meet in areas of common interest, instead of the bilateral format (NATO + 1) established under the PJC.

Cooperation between Russia and NATO focused on several main sectors: terrorism, military cooperation, Afghanistan (including transportation by Russia of non-military International Security Assistance Force freight (see NATO logistics in the Afghan War), and fighting local drug production), industrial cooperation, and weapons non-proliferation. As a result of its structured working groups across a range of areas, the NRC served as the primary forum for consensus-building, cooperation, and consultation on topics such as terrorism, proliferation, peacekeeping, airspace management, and missile defense.

"Joint decisions and actions", taken under NATO-Russia Council agreements, include:

- Fighting terrorism
- Military cooperation (joint military exercises and personnel training)
- Cooperation on Afghanistan:
  - Russia providing training courses for anti-narcotics officers from Afghanistan and Central Asia countries in cooperation with the UN
  - Transportation by Russia of non-military freight in support of NATO's ISAF in Afghanistan, industrial cooperation, cooperation on defence interoperability, non-proliferation, and other areas.

Notably, on a press conference on 28 May 2002 NATO Summit, president Putin was asked about Ukraine's intention to join NATO and answered that "our position on expansion of NATO is known, but Ukraine should not stand aside of the global processes to strengthen the world security and, as a sovereign country, it's able to make its own choices in ensuring its security". He also added he "doesn't see anything controversial or hostile" in Ukraine's plans. NRC was officially dissolved on 3 December 2025.

== Downturn in relations (2005–2013) ==
NATO–Russia relations took a downturn during the second presidential term of Russian president Putin, following the Ukrainian Orange Revolution in 2004–2005 and the Russo-Georgian War in 2008. Against these headwinds, calls from within the ranks of the US military to increase collaboration fell on hard ground. In this period, Russia undertook several hostile trade actions against Ukraine (see #Trade and economy below). Several highly-publicised murders of Putin's opponents also occurred in that period, marking his increasingly authoritarian rule (see #Ideology and propaganda below).

=== Baltic states accession ===
The Baltic states of Estonia, Latvia and Lithuania, formerly part of the Soviet Union, joined NATO in 2004. After this, no other countries bordering Russia joined NATO for almost twenty years.

Russian president Putin said in May 2005,

"I do not really understand exactly how ... the expansion of NATO to take in our Baltic neighbors can bring greater security. If other former Soviet republics want to join NATO, our attitude will remain the same. But I want to stress that we will respect their choice because it is their sovereign right to decide their own defense policy and this will not worsen relations between our countries".

In September 2005, a Russian Su-27 fighter jet veered off course and crashed in Lithuania, which had joined NATO the year before. NATO planes were too slow to intercept the aircraft.

=== Litvinenko assassination ===
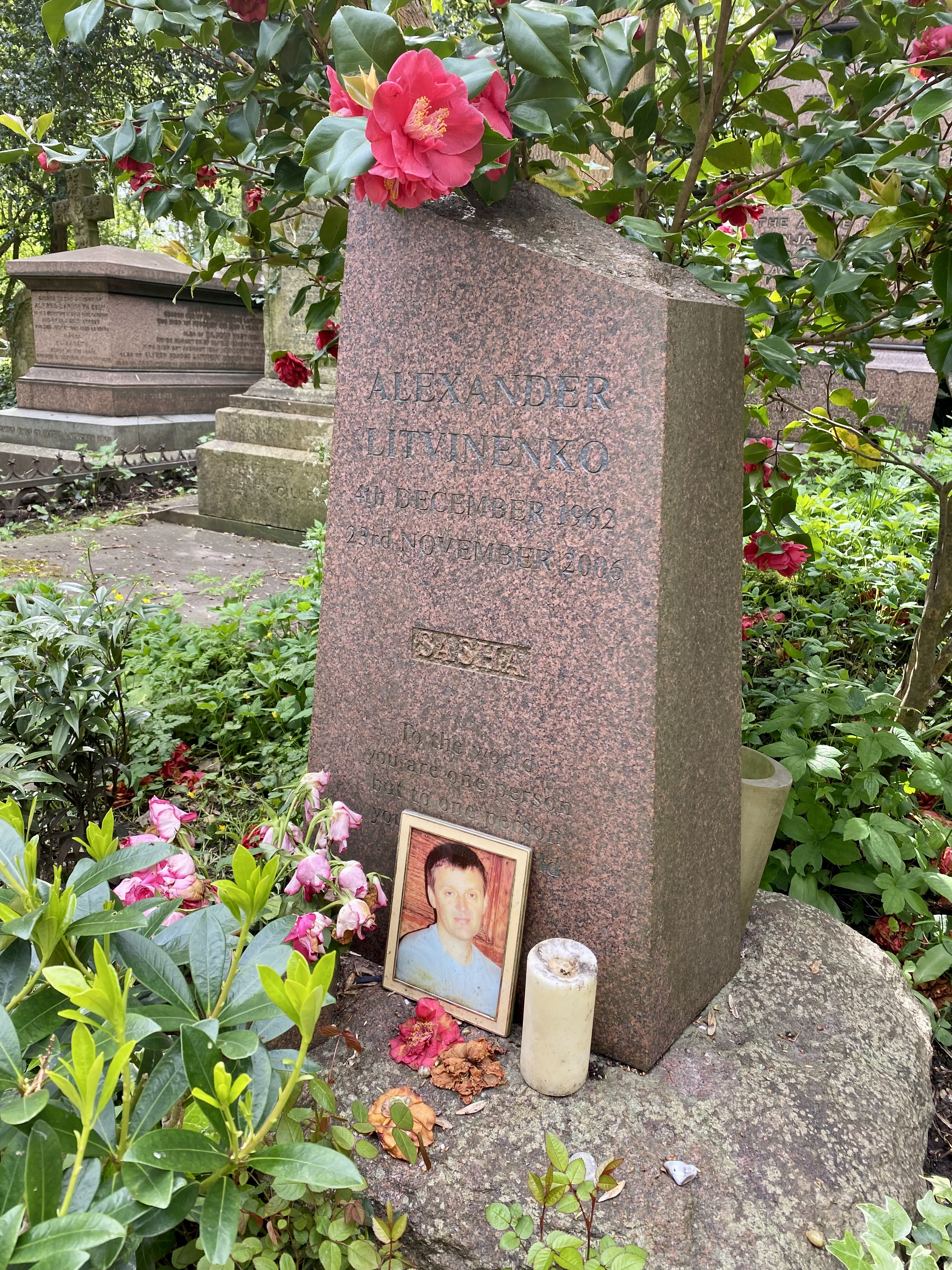
The grave of Alexander Litvinenko, who was assassinated by Russia in the UK, a NATO member state

In 2006, Russian intelligence performed an assassination on the territory of a NATO member state: the United Kingdom. On 1 November 2006, Alexander Litvinenko, a British-naturalised Russian defector and former officer of the Russian Federal Security Service (FSB) who specialised in tackling organized crime and advised British intelligence and coined the term "mafia state", suddenly fell ill and was hospitalised after poisoning with polonium-210; he died from the poisoning on 23 November. A British murder investigation identified Andrey Lugovoy, a former member of Russia's Federal Protective Service (FSO), as the main suspect. Dmitry Kovtun was later named as a second suspect. The United Kingdom demanded that Lugovoy be extradited, however Russia denied the extradition as the Russian constitution prohibits the extradition of Russian citizens, leading to a straining of relations between Russia and the United Kingdom.

=== Putin's Munich speech and aftermath ===
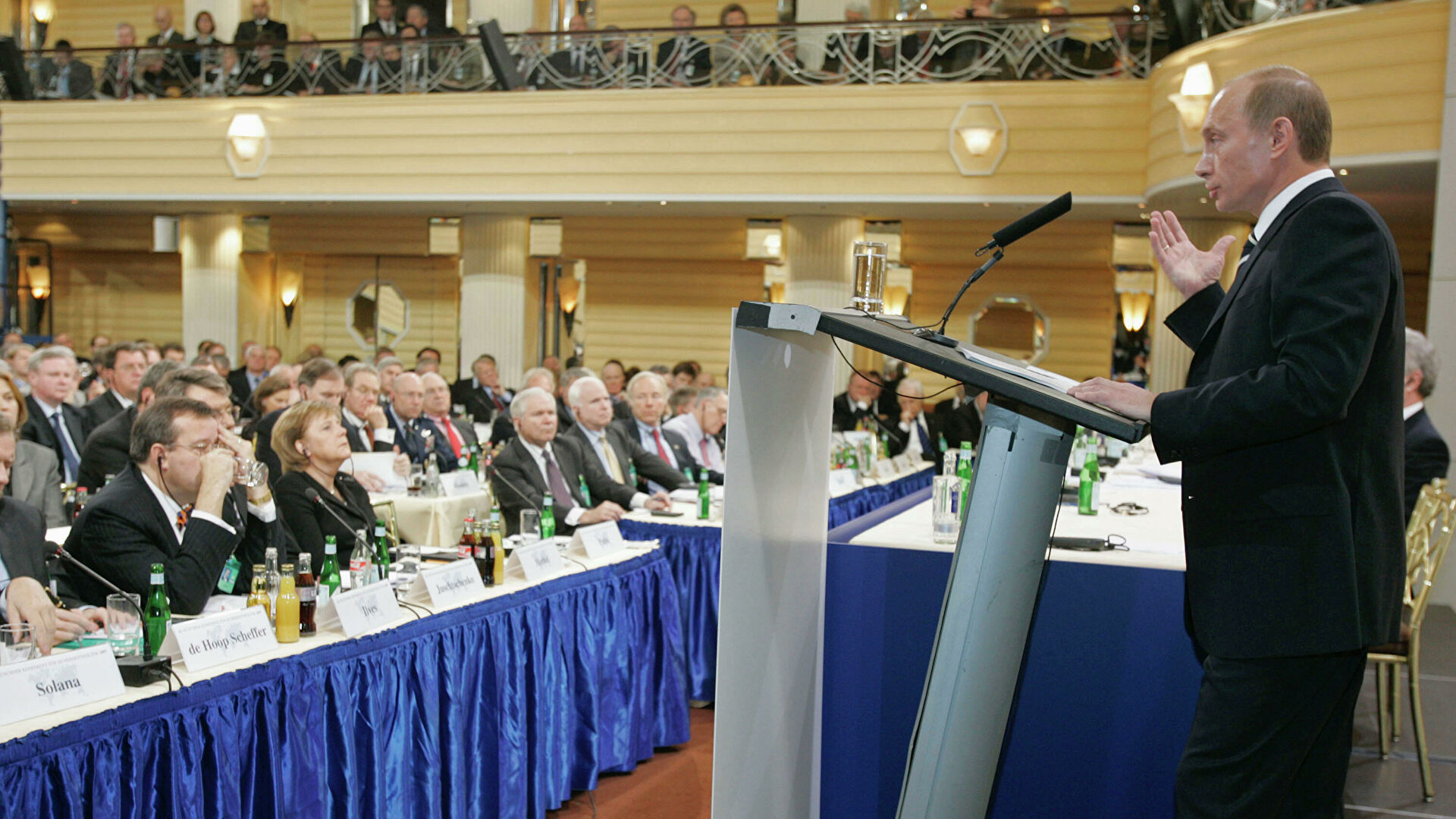
Putin giving his speech at the 43rd Munich Security Conference in 2007

At the 43rd Munich Security Conference in February 2007, Russian president Putin gave a landmark speech in which he rejected Europe's post-Cold War security architecture. Putin condemned NATO eastern enlargement, claiming that "NATO has put its frontline forces on our borders ... a serious provocation that reduces the level of mutual trust". He also condemned plans for a NATO missile defense system in Europe, saying that Russia's ballistic missiles could overcome any defense shield. The speech marked a shift in Russia–NATO relations under Putin.

Russia announced in July 2007 that it would no longer adhere to the Adapted Conventional Armed Forces in Europe Treaty (CFE Treaty) because NATO had still not ratified it. NATO had said it would not ratify the treaty until Russia ended its occupation of Moldova and Georgia. Russia continued to reject the principle of consent for its troop presence in Georgia and Moldova, and began ignoring Vienna Convention limits on troop concentrations, military exercises and transparency.

=== Kosovo declaration of independence ===
In 2008, Russia condemned Kosovo's declaration of independence, stating they "expect the UN mission and NATO-led forces in Kosovo to take immediate action to carry out their mandate ... including the annulling of the decisions of Pristina's self-governing organs and the taking of tough administrative measures against them." Putin described the recognition of Kosovo's independence by several major world powers as "a terrible precedent, which will de facto blow apart the whole system of international relations". He added: "it is a two-ended stick and the second end will come back and hit them in the face".

=== Bucharest summit ===
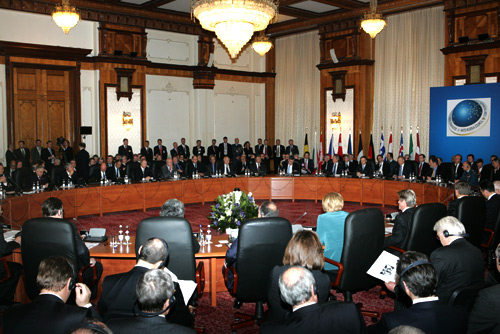
Meeting of the NATO–Russia council in Bucharest, Romania on 4 April 2008

In early 2008, U.S. president George W. Bush vowed full support for admitting Georgia and Ukraine into NATO, to the opposition of Russia. The Russian government claimed that Ukraine and Georgia joining NATO may harm European security. At the time, opinion polls found that Russians were mostly opposed to any eastward enlargement of NATO. Russian president Dmitry Medvedev stated in 2008 that "no country would be happy about a military bloc to which it did not belong approaching its borders". Russia's Deputy Foreign Minister Grigory Karasin warned that Ukraine joining NATO would cause a "deep crisis" in Russia–Ukraine relations and also harm Russia's relations with the West.

In December 2025 the US National Security Archive has declassified a stenogram of 6 April 2008 meeting between Bush and Putin in which the latter threatened that Russia would be relying on anti-NATO forces in Ukraine and "creating problems" in Ukraine "all the time" if the country's NATO course ever goes beyond declaration. Putin also expressed his opposition to missile defenses in Poland and Czech Republic and demands access to the sites to "see what is targeted against us". Putin also welcomes US readiness to discuss these matters and admits that "with the Chinese we have no such agreements, they refuse to agree on notification on launches". Finally, Putin says his main disagreement is "cementing Ukraine's status as in the Western world" and that he is ready to "create problems" to prevent that.

Relying on the anti-NATO forces in Ukraine, Russia would be working on stripping NATO of the possibility of enlarging. Russia would be creating problems there all the time. What for? What is the meaning of Ukrainian membership in NATO? What benefit is there for NATO and the U.S.? There can be only one reason for it and that would be to cement Ukraine's status as in the Western world and that would be the logic.

— Vladimir Putin, "Memorandum of Conversation. Subject: Meeting with President of Russia"

=== Russian invasion of Georgia ===
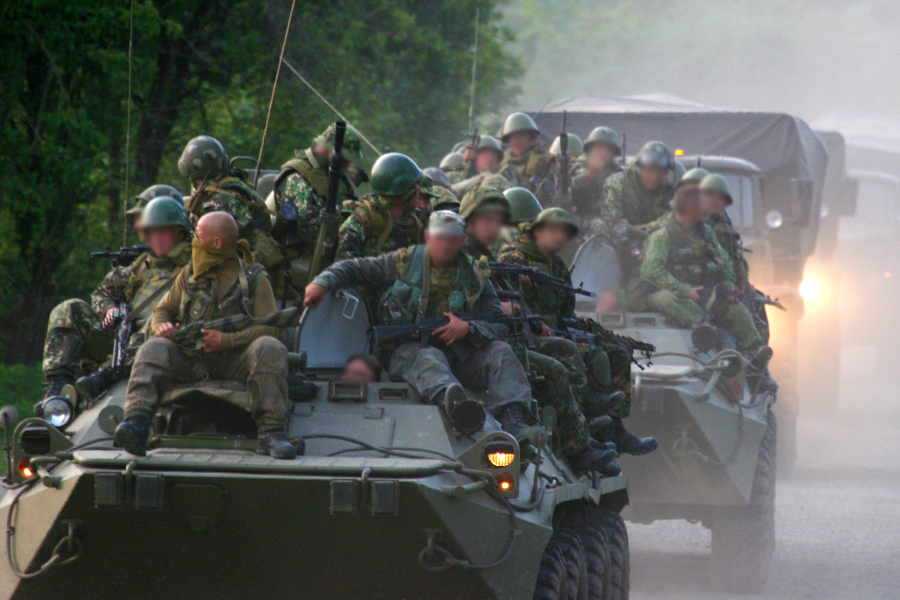
Russian troops invading Georgia

Relations between NATO and Russia soured in summer 2008 due to Russia's war against Georgia. The North Atlantic Council condemned Russia for occupying parts of Georgia and recognizing the South Ossetia and Abkhazia regions of Georgia as independent states. The Secretary General of NATO said Russia's recognition of violated numerous UN Security Council resolutions, including resolutions endorsed by Russia itself: the UN Charter, the CSCE Helsinki Final Act of 1975 and others. Russian media heavily stressed the precedent of the recent Kosovo declaration of independence.

In 2011, Russian president Medvedev said that Russia's 2008 invasion of Georgia had thwarted the country's plans to join NATO.

=== 2009–2013 ===
In January 2009, the Russian envoy to NATO Dmitry Rogozin said the NATO-Russia council was "a body where scholastic discussions were held." A US official shared this view, stating: "We want now to structure cooperation more practically, in areas where you can achieve results, instead of insisting on things that won't happen."

Relations were further strained in May 2009 when NATO expelled two Russian diplomats over accusations of spying. Tensions also flared over a planned NATO training exercise called Cooperative 09 at Vaziani Military Base in Georgia. Russian president Dmitry Medvedev said, "The planned NATO exercises in Georgia, no matter how one tries to convince us otherwise, are an overt provocation. One cannot carry out exercises in a place where there was just a war".

In September 2009, the Russian government said that a proposed NATO missile defense system based in Poland and in the Czech Republic could threaten its own defences. The Russian Space Forces commander, Colonel General Vladimir Popovkin stated in 2007 that "[the] trajectories of Iranian or North Korean missiles would hardly pass anywhere near the territory of the Czech republic, but every possible launch of Russian ICBMs from the territory of European Russia, or made by Russian Northern Fleet would be controlled by the [radar] station". However, later in 2009, US president Barack Obama canceled the anti-missile shield in Poland and the Czech Republic after Russia threatened the US with military response, and warned Poland that by agreeing to NATO's anti-missile system, it was exposing itself to a strike or nuclear attack from Russia.

In December 2009, NATO approached Russia for help in Afghanistan, requesting permission for the alliance to fly cargo (including possibly military ones) over Russian territory to Afghanistan and to provide more helicopters for the Afghan armed forces. However, Russia only allowed transit of non-military supplies through its territory.

In May 2011, NATO and Russia carried out their first joint submarine exercise, and in June 2011, NATO and Russia participated in their first joint fighter jet exercise, dubbed "Vigilant Skies 2011".

The 2011 military intervention in Libya was criticized by Russian president Dmitry Medvedev and Russian prime minister Vladimir Putin, who said that "[UNSC Resolution 1973] is defective and flawed...It allows everything. It resembles medieval calls for crusades."

In April 2012, Left Front protested in Russia over their country's co-operation with NATO.

== Crimea annexation, war in Donbas and Syria (2014–2020) ==
Russia–NATO relations became hostile from 2014, when Russia annexed Crimea and invaded eastern Ukraine, starting the War in Donbas. NATO then ended co-operation, and many member states imposed sanctions on Russia. To deter further Russian aggression, a small NATO force was deployed in the Baltic states and Poland for the first time, at the request of those countries. Some political analysts see this as the beginning of a Second Cold War. Over the following years there was a rise in military incidents, while Russia repeatedly probed NATO defenses and carried out covert assassinations in NATO countries. A few NATO members began training and arming Ukraine's military of their own accord. Russia also intervened in the Syrian civil war in support of the Ba'athist regime, while some NATO members independently intervened in support of the Syrian opposition.

=== Russian annexation of Crimea ===
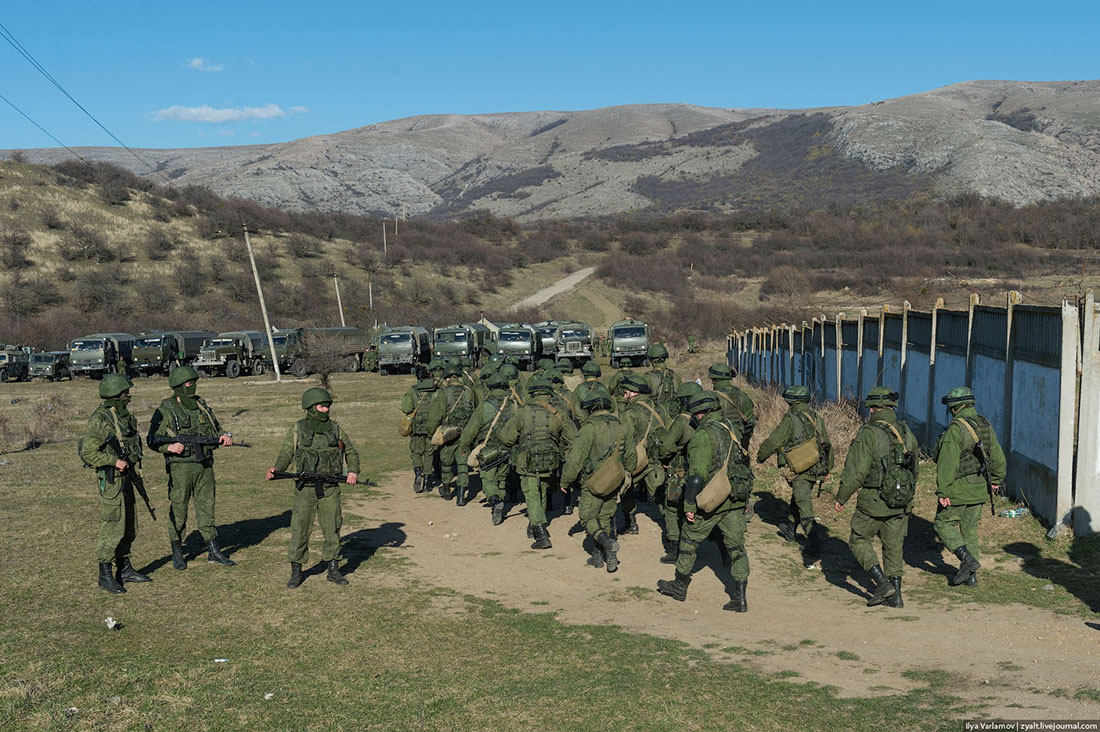
Unmarked Russian troops during the Russian annexation of Crimea, which caused NATO to suspend co-operation with Russia

In February–March 2014, during Ukraine's Revolution of Dignity, Russian soldiers without insignia occupied Crimea, a territory of Ukraine. The soldiers seized Crimea's parliament, which then installed a pro-Russian government. A disputed referendum on Crimea's status was held under Russian occupation. According to the Russian-installed authorities, the result was overwhelmingly in favor of joining Russia, which then annexed Crimea. NATO told Russia to stop its actions and said it supported Ukraine's territorial integrity and sovereignty.

In his Crimea speech on 19 March 2014, Russian president Putin said that the dissolution of the Soviet Union had "robbed" Russia of territory and called this an "outrageous historical injustice". He said "we are against having a military alliance making itself at home right in our backyard or in our historic territory. I simply cannot imagine that we would travel to Sevastopol to visit NATO sailors".

NATO secretary general Anders Fogh Rasmussen said in a speech on 19 March 2014:

The annexation of Crimea through a so-called referendum held at gunpoint is illegal and illegitimate. ... it undermines our security. Not just NATO's or Ukraine's security, but also Russia's. If the rules don't apply, if agreements are not honored, certainly Russia also stands to suffer the consequences. ... Russia was among those who committed in 1994 to respect Ukraine's territorial integrity and sovereignty. Russia pledged not to threaten or use force against Ukraine. By turning its back on that agreement, Russia has called into question its credibility and reliability ... No one wants to turn away from our cooperation with Russia. But no one can ignore that Russia has violated the very principles upon which that cooperation is built.

On 1 April 2014, NATO foreign ministers issued a joint statement announcing:

We, the Foreign Ministers of NATO, are united in our condemnation of Russia's illegal military intervention in Ukraine and Russia's violation of Ukraine's sovereignty and territorial integrity. We do not recognize Russia's illegal and illegitimate attempt to annex Crimea. ... We have decided to suspend all practical civilian and military cooperation between NATO and Russia. Our political dialogue in the NATO-Russia Council can continue, as necessary.

Russia used Kosovo's declaration of independence as a justification for recognizing the independence of Crimea, citing the so-called "Kosovo independence precedent".

On 28 March 2014, Jens Stoltenberg was elected to become next NATO Secretary-General later in the year. Stoltenberg emphasized that Russia's invasion of Crimea was a "brutal reminder of the necessity of NATO," stating that Russia's actions were "the first time since the Second World War that a country has annexed a territory belonging to another country." Stoltenberg highlighted the need for NATO having a sufficiently strong military capacity to deter Russia. He further said that Ukraine's possible NATO membership would be "a very important question" in the near future.

=== Russian invasion of the Donbas ===
Map of Russian-controlled territory in Ukraine, September 2014

In April 2014, shortly after the Crimean annexation, towns and cities were seized in Ukraine's Donbas region by heavily-armed Russian paramilitaries. Their commander, Igor 'Strelkov' Girkin admitted that this sparked the War in Donbas, as Ukraine soon launched an operation to retake the territory. On 25 April, the militants kidnapped eight OSCE observers and held them captive, claiming they were "NATO spies".

In late August 2014, NATO released satellite imagery showing Russian forces operating inside Ukraine (see 2014 Russian invasion of the Donbas). NATO also said that "large quantities of advanced weapons, including air defence systems, artillery, tanks, and armoured personnel carriers [are] being transferred to separatist forces". NATO Brigadier General Nico Tak said "Russia's ultimate aim is to alleviate pressure on separatist fighters in order to prolong this conflict". Russia denied the claims. Because of the invasion, Ukraine's government said it will ask parliament to drop the country's neutral status and put it on a path towards NATO membership.

At NATO's Wales summit in early September 2014, NATO Secretary General Rasmussen said "Russia is now fighting against Ukraine, in Ukraine. Russian troops and Russian tanks are attacking the Ukrainian forces. And while talking about peace, Russia has not made one single step to make peace possible". The new NATO-Ukraine Commission issued a statement condemning Russia's actions and saying "Russia must end its support for militants in eastern Ukraine, withdraw its troops and stop its military activities along and across the Ukrainian border".

On 2 December 2014, NATO foreign ministers announced that a work had begun on creating a rapid reaction force which could deploy wherever needed at short notice. In June 2015, NATO tested the new rapid reaction force for the first time in Poland, with more than 2,000 troops from nine states taking part in the exercise.

=== Rise in military encounters ===
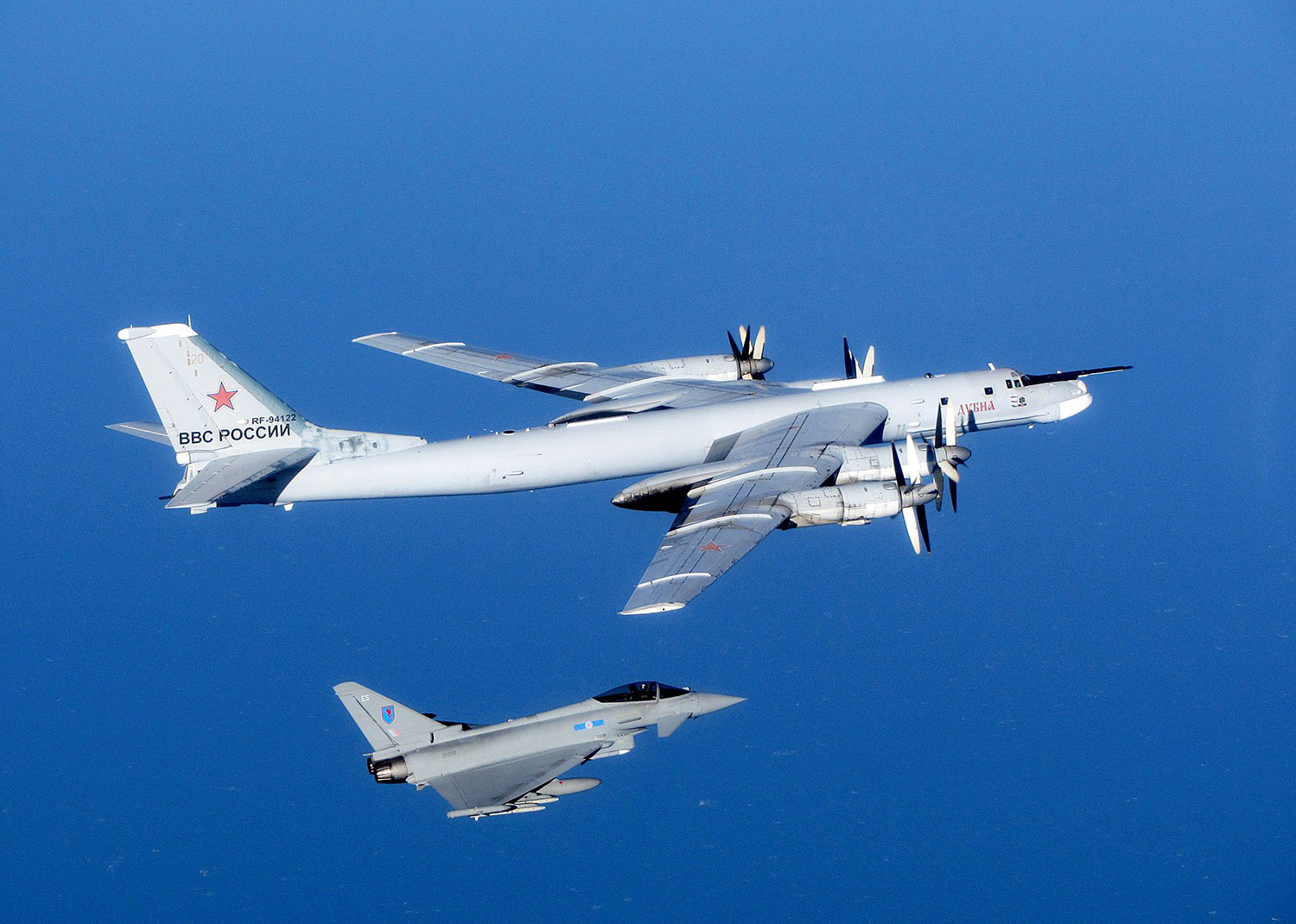
Royal Air Force Eurofighter Typhoon (bottom) intercepting a Russian Air Force Tupolev Tu-95 bomber (top) approaching Britain in September 2014

In the months after the Crimea annexation, there was an increase in Russian military aircraft flying toward NATO airspace, and it was reported that close encounters between Russian and NATO military aircraft had risen to "cold war levels". According to a report released in November 2014, "a dangerous game of brinkmanship is being played, with the potential for unintended escalation in what is now the most serious security crisis in Europe since the cold war". It highlighted 40 dangerous or sensitive incidents recorded in the eight months alone, including a near-collision between a Russian reconnaissance plane and a passenger plane taking off from Denmark in March with 132 passengers on board. An unprecedented increase in Russian air force and naval activity in the Baltic region prompted NATO to step up its longstanding rotation of military jets in Lithuania. There was similar heightened Russian air force activity in the Asia-Pacific region, relying on the resumed use of the formerly-abandoned Soviet military base at Cam Ranh Bay, Vietnam. In March 2015, Russia's defense minister Sergei Shoigu said that Russia's long-range bombers would continue patrolling various parts of the world and expand into other regions.

=== Alleged Russian violation of INF Treaty ===
In July, the U.S. formally accused Russia of having violated the 1987 Intermediate-Range Nuclear Forces (INF) Treaty by testing a prohibited medium-range ground-launched cruise missile (presumably R-500, a modification of Iskander) and threatened to retaliate accordingly. In early June 2015, the U.S. State Department reported that Russia had failed to correct the violation of the I.N.F. Treaty; the U.S. government was said to have made no discernible headway in making Russia so much as acknowledge the compliance problem.

The US government's October 2014 report claimed that Russia had 1,643 nuclear warheads ready to launch (an increase from 1,537 in 2011) – one more than the US, thus overtaking the US for the first time since 2000; both countries' deployed capacity being in violation of the 2010 New START treaty that sets a cap of 1,550 nuclear warheads. Likewise, even before 2014, the US had set about implementing a large-scale program, worth up to a trillion dollars, aimed at overall revitalization of its atomic energy industry, which includes plans for a new generation of weapon carriers.

=== Bombing of Czech ammunition stores ===
In 2014, two explosions of ammunition depots occurred in Vrbětice, Vlachovice, in the Zlín District of the Czech Republic, a NATO member. The first explosion occurred on 16 October, and the second on 3 December. Two people were killed in the first explosion. The cleanup of unexploded ammunition left by the blasts was finished on 13 October 2020. According to the Security Information Service and the Police of the Czech Republic, two agents from GRU Unit 29155 were involved in the explosions, with the motivation of disrupting weapons supplies to Ukraine. In 2024, Czech president Petr Pavel declared that the investigations and information available to him confirm the event to be a Russian attack on Czech (thus NATO) soil.

At the end of 2014, Putin approved a revised national military doctrine, which listed a NATO military buildup near Russia's borders as the top military threat.

=== 2015 ===
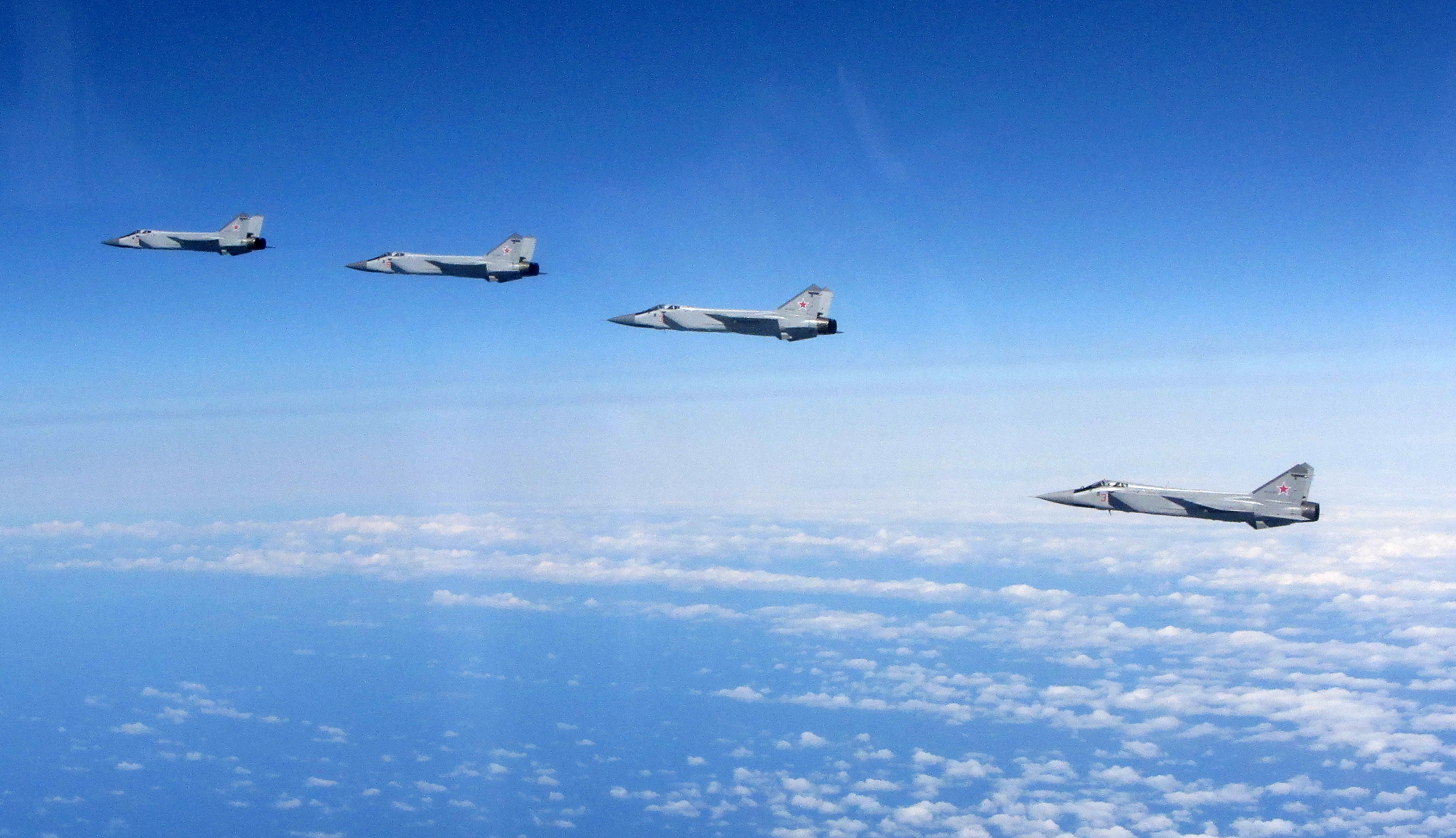
Russian Mikoyan MiG-31 jets being intercepted by NATO aircraft over the Baltic Sea, July 2015

In January 2015, the UK, Denmark, Lithuania and Estonia called on the European Union to jointly confront Russian propaganda by setting up a "permanent platform" to work with NATO in strategic communications and boost local Russian-language media. NATO took a radically new position on propaganda and counter-propaganda in 2015, that "Entirely legal activities, such as running a pro-Moscow TV station, could become a broader assault on a country that would require a NATO response under Article Five of the Treaty." It was reported that "as part of the hardened stance, Britain has committed £750,000 of UK money to support a counter-propaganda unit at NATO's headquarters in Brussels."

NATO secretary-general Stoltenberg called for more cooperation with Russia in the fight against terrorism following the deadly January 2015 Île-de-France attacks.

In early February 2015, NATO diplomats said that concern was growing in NATO over indications that Russia's nuclear strategy appeared to point to a lowering of the threshold for using nuclear weapons in any conflict. The conclusion was followed by British Defense Secretary Michael Fallon saying that Britain must update its nuclear arsenal in response to Russian modernization of its nuclear forces. Later in February, Fallon said that Putin could repeat tactics used in Ukraine in Baltic members of the NATO alliance; he also said: "NATO has to be ready for any kind of aggression from Russia, whatever form it takes. NATO is getting ready." Fallon noted that it was not a new Cold War with Russia, as the situation was already "pretty warm".

In March 2015, Russia, citing NATO's alleged breach of the 1990 Treaty on Conventional Armed Forces in Europe, said that the suspension of its participation in it, announced in 2007, was now "complete".

In spring, the Russian Defense Ministry announced it was planning to deploy more forces in occupied Crimea to reinforce its Black Sea Fleet, including re-deployment of nuclear-capable Tupolev Tu-22M3 ('Backfire') long-range strike bombers. April 2015 saw the publication of leaked information ascribed to semi-official sources within the Russian military and intelligence establishment, about Russia's alleged preparedness for a nuclear response to certain non-nuclear attacks on the part of NATO; such implied threats were interpreted as "an attempt to create strategic uncertainty" and undermine Western political cohesion.

Between 28 April and 4 May 2015, the Russian GRU Unit 29155 perpetrated in Sofia (thus on NATO soil) the poisoning with Novichok of Bulgarian arms dealer Emilian Gebrev, who was supplying arms to Ukraine and Georgia. Gebrev, his son and his factory manager survived two poisoning attempts.

In June 2015, an independent Russian military analyst was quoted by a major American newspaper as saying:

Everybody should understand that we are living in a totally different world than two years ago. In that world, which we lost, it was possible to organize your security with treaties, with mutual-trust measures. Now we have come to an absolutely different situation, where the general way to ensure your security is military deterrence."

In June 2015, US Defence Secretary Ashton Carter said the US would deploy heavy weapons, including tanks, armoured vehicles and artillery, in Bulgaria, Estonia, Latvia, Lithuania, Poland, and Romania. This would be done with the agreement of those countries, and was to reassure NATO's eastern members in response to Russia's war against Ukraine. The move was interpreted by Western commentators as marking the beginning of a reorientation of NATO's strategy. It was called by a senior Russian Defence Ministry official "the most aggressive act by Washington since the Cold War" and criticized by the Russian Foreign Ministry as "inadequate in military terms" and "an obvious return by the United States and its allies to the schemes of 'the Cold War'".

On its part, the U.S. expressed concern over Putin's announcement of plans to add over 40 new ballistic missiles to Russia's nuclear weapons arsenal in 2015. American observers and analysts such as Steven Pifer said the US had no reason for alarm about the new missiles, as long as Russia remained within the limits of the 2010 New Strategic Arms Reduction Treaty (New START). Pifer saw the nuclear saber-rattling by Russia's leadership as mainly bluff and bluster designed to conceal Russia's weaknesses; however, Pifer suggested that the most alarming motivation behind this rhetoric could be Putin seeing nuclear weapons not merely as tools of deterrence, but as tools of coercion.

In November 2015, NATO's top military commander US General Philip Breedlove said the alliance was "watching for indications" that Russia could move any of its nuclear arsenal to Crimea. In December, Russian foreign minister Sergey Lavrov said re-deployment of nuclear-capable Tupolev Tu-22M3 ('Backfire') long-range strike bombers to Crimea would be a legitimate action because "Crimea has now become part of [Russia]".

NATO-Russia tensions rose further after, on 24 November 2015, Turkey shot down a Russian warplane that allegedly violated Turkish airspace while on a mission in northwestern Syria. Russian officials denied that the plane had entered Turkish airspace. Shortly after the incident, NATO called an emergency meeting to discuss the matter. Stoltenberg said "We stand in solidarity with Turkey and support the territorial integrity of our NATO ally".

In December 2015, NATO member states formally invited Montenegro to join the alliance, which drew a response from Russia that it would suspend cooperation with that country.

=== 2016 ===
By 2016, NATO interceptions of Russian military aircraft had reached their highest rate since the Cold War.

Shortly before a meeting of the NATO–Russia Council at the level of permanent representatives on 20 April, the first such meeting since June 2014, Russian foreign minister Sergey Lavrov cited what he saw as "an unprecedented military buildup since the end of the Cold War and the presence of NATO on the so-called eastern flank of the alliance with the goal of exerting military and political pressure on Russia", and said "Russia does not plan and will not be drawn into a senseless confrontation and is convinced that there is no reasonable alternative to mutually beneficial all-European cooperation in security." Russia also warned against moving defensive missiles to Turkey's border with Syria. NATO secretary general, Jens Stoltenberg, said: "NATO and Russia have profound and persistent disagreements. Today's meeting did not change that."

The first site of the NATO missile defence system was opened in Deveselu, Romania, in May 2016. It was designed to shoot down long-range missiles. Russia re-stated that the U.S.-built system undermined Russia's security, was a "direct threat to global and regional security", was in violation of the INF Treaty (which Russia had violated), and that measures were "being taken to ensure the necessary level of security for Russia".

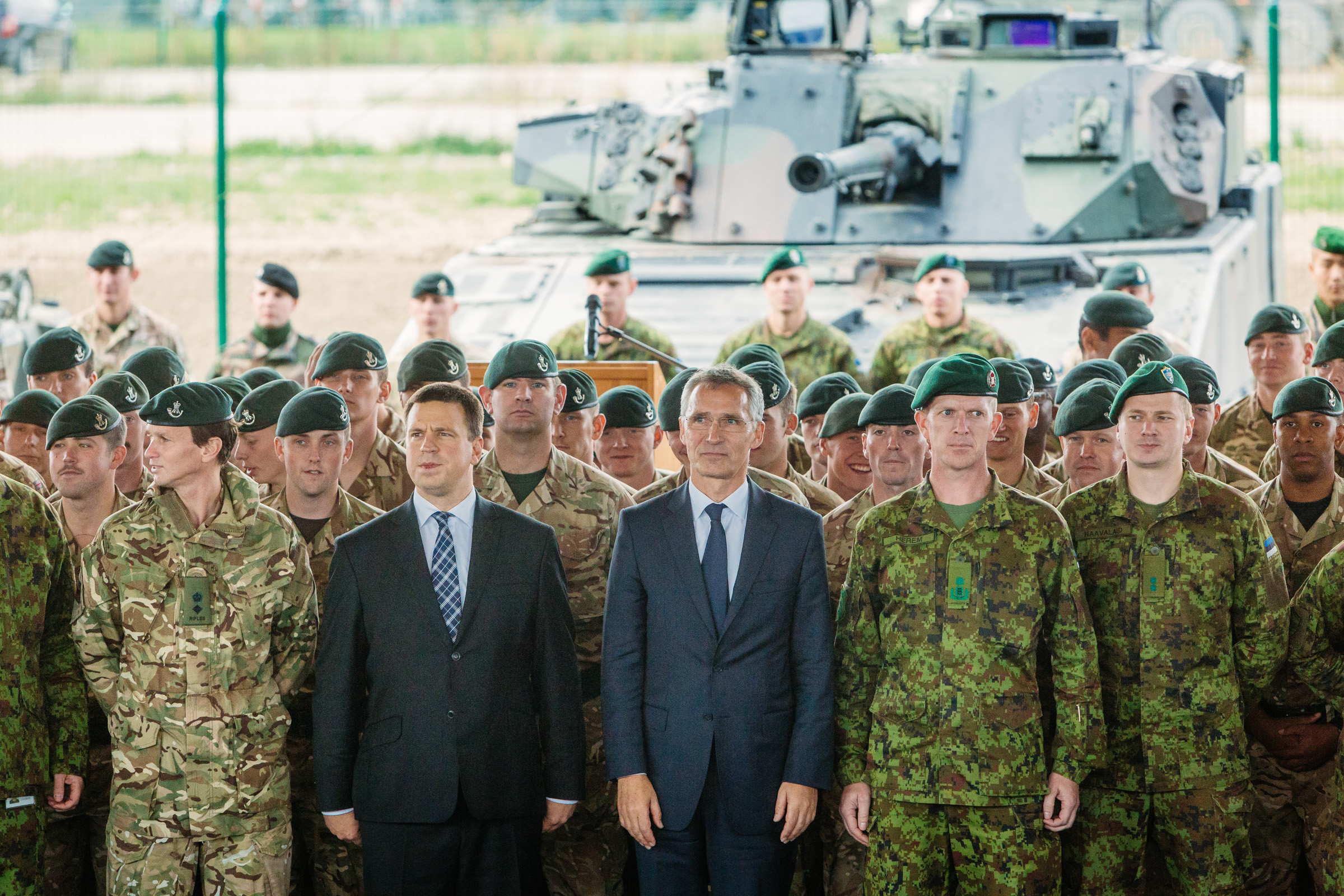
NATO Secretary-General Jens Stoltenberg meeting officials from the Enhanced Forward Presence in Estonia, 2017

The July 2016 Warsaw NATO summit approved the deployment of NATO forces to the Baltic states and eastern Poland for the first time, in response to Russia's 2014 invasion of Ukraine. Four multinational battalions (3,000–4,000 troops altogether) would be deployed in NATO member states Estonia, Latvia, Lithuania and Poland. These countries had requested a permanent NATO presence to deter any Russian attack. NATO stated that the deployment was meant to show "solidarity, determination, and ability to act by triggering an immediate Allied response to any aggression". This became known as NATO Enhanced Forward Presence. A 2016 Levada poll found that 68% of Russians think that deploying NATO troops in the former Eastern bloc countries is a threat to Russia.

Leaders at the Warsaw summit "condemned Russia's ongoing and wide-ranging military build-up" in Crimea and expressed concern over "Russia's efforts and stated plans for further military build-up in the Black Sea region". They also stated that Russia's "significant military presence and support for the regime in Syria", and its military build-up in the Eastern Mediterranean "posed further risks". NATO leaders agreed to step up support for Ukraine: in a meeting of the NATO-Ukraine Commission, the Allied leaders reviewed the security situation with President of Ukraine Petro Poroshenko, welcomed the government's plans for reform, and endorsed a Comprehensive Assistance Package for Ukraine to "help make Ukraine's defence and security institutions more effective, efficient and accountable".

At the meeting of the Russia–NATO Council held shortly after the Warsaw summit, Russia warned NATO against intensifying its military activity in the Black Sea. Russia also said it agreed to have its military pilots flying over the Baltic Sea turn on the cockpit transmitters, known as transponders, if NATO aircraft did likewise.

In July 2016, Russia's military announced that a regiment of long-range surface-to-air S-400 weapon system would be deployed in the city of Feodosia in Crimea in August that year, beefing up Russia's anti-access/area denial capabilities around the peninsula.

==== Montenegrin coup plot ====
A coup d'état in the capital of Montenegro, Podgorica was allegedly planned and prepared for 16 October 2016, the day of the parliamentary election, according to Montenegro's special prosecutor. In September 2017, the trial of those indicted in connection with the plot began in the High Court in Podgorica, the indictees including leaders of the Montenegrin opposition and two alleged Russian intelligence agents. Russian government officials denied any involvement. It is believed that the plot was designed as a last-ditch attempt by the Montenegrin pro-Serbian and pro-Russian opposition to prevent Montenegro's accession to NATO, a move stridently opposed by Russia's government that had issued direct threats to Montenegro concerning such eventuality. This theory was re-affirmed by the court verdict handed down in 2019. The Moscow–based Russian Institute for Strategic Studies (RISS), which has close ties to Russian Foreign Intelligence Service (SVR), was mentioned by mass media as one of the organisations involved in devising the coup plot; in early November 2017, Russian president Vladimir Putin sacked the RISS director, Leonid P. Reshetnikov, a ranking veteran officer of the SVR. In May 2019 the then Foreign Secretary of the United Kingdom, Jeremy Hunt, stated:

The failed coup attempt against Montenegro in 2016 was one of the most outrageous examples of Russia's attempts to undermine European democracy. The GRU's brazen attempt to interfere with Montenegro's national elections and undermine Montenegro's application to join NATO is yet another example of destabilising and aggressive Russian behaviour over the last decade.

=== 2017 ===
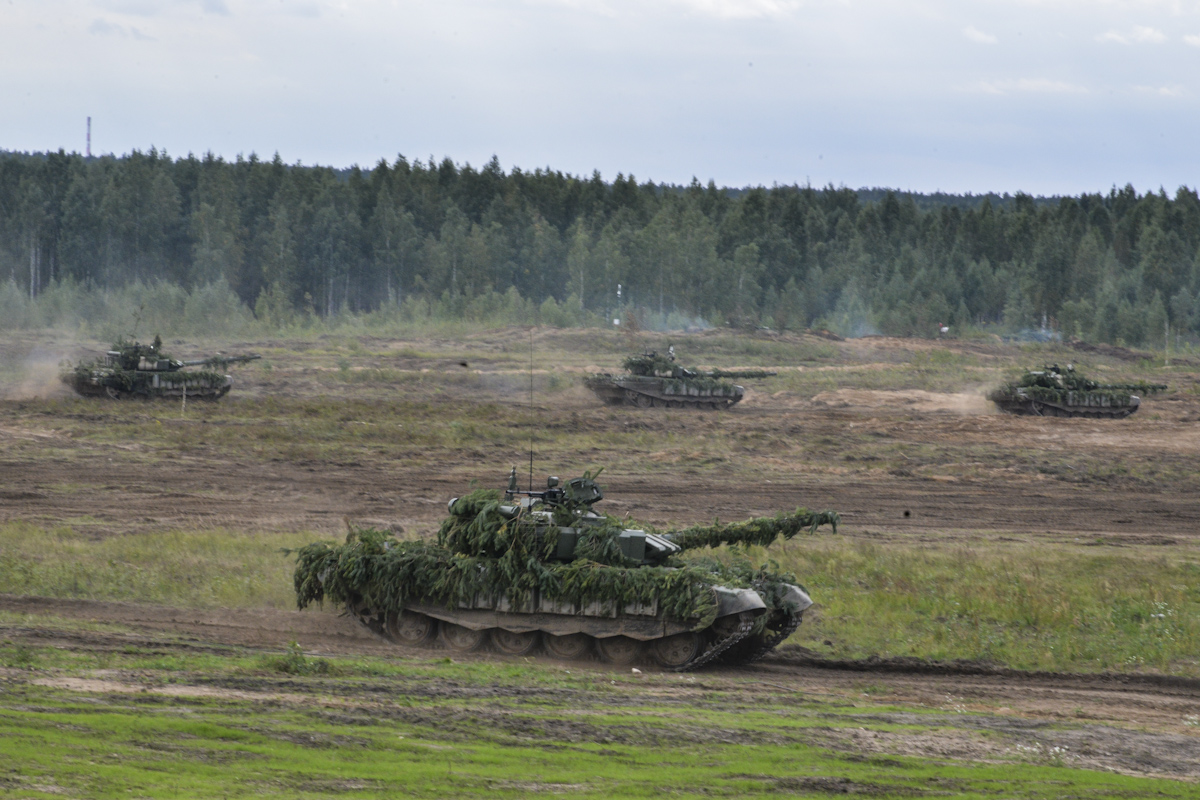
T-72 tanks taking part in the Zapad 2017 military exercises in Russia and Belarus, near the borders with NATO

On 18 February 2017, Russia's foreign minister Sergey Lavrov said he supported the resumption of military cooperation with NATO. In late March 2017, the NATO-Russia Council met in Brussels, Belgium. In July, the Council met again in Brussels. Following the meeting, NATO Secretary General Jens Stoltenberg said that Allies and Russia had had a "frank and constructive discussion" on Ukraine, Afghanistan, and transparency and risk reduction. The two sides briefed each other on the upcoming Russian/Belarusian Zapad 2017 exercise, and NATO's Exercise Trident Javelin 2017.

In early March 2017, the US military accused Russia of breaching the INF arms control treaty by deploying a new ground-launched cruise missile, the SSC-8. General Paul Selva, Vice Chairman of the US Joint Chiefs of Staff, said "The system itself presents a risk to most of our facilities in Europe and we believe that the Russians have deliberately deployed it in order to pose a threat to NATO".

In August 2017, NATO declared that its four multinational battlegroups in Estonia, Latvia, Lithuania and Poland were fully operational, following the decision taken at the 2016 Warsaw summit.

The Zapad 2017 military exercises by Russia and Belarus were the first since the annexation of Crimea, and stoked fears by NATO that it could be used as cover for another invasion. UK secretary of state for defence Michael Fallon warned that the exercises in Belarus and Kaliningrad, on NATO's borders, were "designed to provoke us". Fallon said that the number of Russian troops taking part could reach 100,000, although they were later confirmed to be around 12,000.

=== 2018 ===
In February 2018, NATO secretary general Jens Stoltenberg stated: "We don't see any threat [from Russia] against any NATO ally and therefore, I'm always careful speculating too much about hypothetical situations." Stoltenberg welcomed the 2018 Russia–United States Summit between Vladimir Putin and Donald Trump in Helsinki, Finland. He said NATO is not trying to isolate Russia.

In response to the poisoning of Sergei and Yulia Skripal in Salisbury, England (thus on NATO soil) on 4 March 2018, Stoltenberg announced that NATO would be expelling seven Russian diplomats from the Russian mission to NATO in Brussels. Russia blamed the US for the NATO response. The attempted assassination and subsequent agent exposures was an embarrassment for Putin and for Russia's spying organization. It was allegedly organized by the secret Unit 29155 of the Russian GRU, under the command of Major General Andrei V. Averyanov.

=== 2019 ===
President Donald Trump announced on 20 October 2018 that he would withdraw the US from the Intermediate-Range Nuclear Forces Treaty due to Russian non-compliance, stating that Russia had breached the treaty by developing and deploying an intermediate-range cruise missile known as the SSC-8 (Novator 9M729). The Trump administration claimed another reason for the withdrawal was to counter a Chinese arms buildup in the Pacific, including within the South China Sea, as China was not a signatory to the treaty. The US formally suspended the treaty on 1 February 2019, and Russia did so on the following day in response. The United States formally withdrew from the treaty on 2 August 2019.

In April 2019, NATO secretary general Stoltenberg warned a joint session of the U.S. Congress of the threat posed by "a more assertive" Russia to the alliances members, which included a massive military buildup, threats to sovereign states, the use of nerve agents and cyberattacks.

On 23 August 2019, another assassination was performed by Russian intelligence on NATO territory. At around midday in the Kleiner Tiergarten park in Berlin, Germany, Zelimkhan Khangoshvili, an ethnic Chechen Georgian who was a former platoon commander for the Chechen Republic of Ichkeria during the Second Chechen War, and a Georgian military officer during the 2008 Russo-Georgian War, was walking down a wooded path on his way back from the mosque he attended when he was shot three times—once in the shoulder and twice in the head—by a Russian assassin on a bike with a suppressed Glock 26. The bicycle, a plastic bag with the murder weapon, and a wig the perpetrator was using were dumped into the Spree. The suspect, identified as 56-year-old Russian national "Vadim Sokolov" by German police, was apprehended soon after the assassination. The Russian government and Chechen leader Ramzan Kadyrov have both been linked to the killing.

In September 2019, Russian foreign minister Sergey Lavrov said that "NATO approaching our borders is a threat to Russia". He was quoted as saying that if NATO accepts Georgian membership with the article on collective defense covering only Tbilisi-administered territory (i.e., excluding the Georgian territories of Abkhazia and South Ossetia, both of which are currently unrecognized breakaway republics supported by Russia), "we will not start a war, but such conduct will undermine our relations with NATO and with countries who are eager to enter the alliance."

=== 2020 ===
In June 2020, NATO secretary general Jens Stoltenberg stated in a speech that NATO aspires for "a constructive relationship with Russia," emphasizing that the alliance would discuss arms control with Russia diplomatically.

Throughout 2020, NATO air forces intercepted the increased Russian military air patrols near allied airspace, particularly the Baltic and Black Seas. According to the 2020 NATO reports, allied aircraft scrambled more than 400 times, reportedly around 350 of which were Russian military aircraft.

In August 2020, the poisoning of Russian opposition leader Alexei Navalny led NATO to condemn the attack and to call on Russia to cooperate with the ongoing investigation under the Organization for the Prohibition of Chemical Weapons (OPCW).

== Russian military buildup and ultimatum to NATO (2021–2022) ==
European NATO and CSTO member states on the eve of the 2022 Russian invasion of Ukraine: CSTO NATO member states in 2022 States affected by Russian occupation Russian-occupied territories

From March 2021, there was a massive Russian military buildup near Ukraine's borders. On 13 April, NATO secretary-general Jens Stoltenberg called on Russia to halt its military buildup. Russian defense minister Sergey Shoygu said that Russia deployed troops to its western borders for "combat training exercises" in response to NATO "military activities that threaten Russia". Defender-Europe 21, one of the largest NATO-led military exercises in decades took place in Europe in May–June 2021, with preparations beginning in March. It included "nearly simultaneous operations across more than 30 training areas" in Estonia (which borders Russia), Bulgaria, Romania and other countries.

On 6 October 2021, NATO expelled eight Russian diplomats, described as "undeclared intelligence officers", in response to suspected spying and assassinations. This halved the size of the Russian mission to NATO in Brussels to 10. On 18 October, Russia suspended its mission to NATO and ordered the closure of NATO's office in Moscow in retaliation.

In November 2021, Russian president Vladimir Putin warned that he would not tolerate a NATO missile defense shield (to shoot down attacking missiles) ever being deployed in Ukraine. He said that Aegis Ashore interceptors, like those based in Romania and Poland, could be secretly converted to launch Tomahawk missiles that could reach Moscow within minutes. However, there were no such plans to deploy a missile shield in Ukraine. The US secretary of state, Antony Blinken, replied "it's Russia that has developed ground-launched, intermediate-range missiles that can reach Germany and nearly all NATO European territory, despite Russia being a party to the INF Treaty that prohibited these missiles". He added that "Russia's violation led to the termination of that treaty" by the first Trump administration.

Putin asked U.S. president Joe Biden for legal guarantees that NATO never let Ukraine join. NATO secretary-general Jens Stoltenberg replied that "It's only Ukraine and 30 NATO allies that decide when Ukraine is ready to join NATO. Russia has no veto, Russia has no say, and Russia has no right to establish a sphere of influence to try to control their neighbors".

In December 2021, Russian sent an ultimatum to NATO, demanding the alliance end all activity in its Eastern European member states and ban Ukraine or any former Soviet state from ever joining, among other demands. Some of the demands had already been ruled-out by NATO. A senior Biden administration official said the US was willing to discuss the proposals, but added that there were some "that the Russians know are unacceptable". Several Western political analysts suggested Russia was making unrealistic demands as a "smokescreen", knowing they would be rejected; giving Russia a pretext for invading. Others suggested that Putin was "aiming high to squeeze concessions" out of NATO. That same month, Russia warned of "serious military and political consequences" in case of Finland and Sweden's NATO membership. Russia's foreign minister Sergei Lavrov warned "If there is no constructive response within a reasonable time and the West continues its aggressive line, then Russia will be forced to [...] eliminate unacceptable threats to our security".

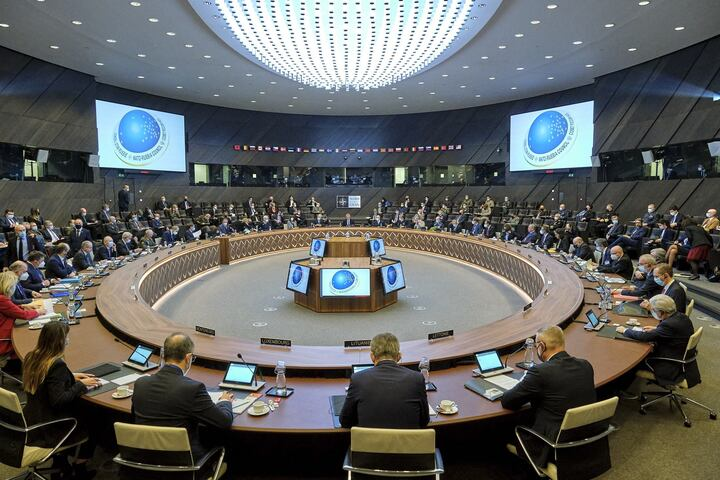
The NATO-Russia Council meets in January 2022 to discuss the 2021–2022 Russo-Ukrainian crisis.

On 12 January 2022, the NATO-Russia Council met at NATO's HQ in Brussels for the last time, to discuss Russia's ongoing military build-up on the Ukrainian border and Russia's demands. Present were NATO secretary general, Jens Stoltenberg, U.S. deputy secretary of state, Wendy Sherman, Russian deputy foreign minister, Alexander Grushko and Russian deputy defence minister, Colonel General Alexander Fomin. Russian diplomat Boris Bondarev recounted a meeting with US officials in January 2022. He said that Russia's deputy foreign minister, Sergei Ryabkov, shouted at American officials: "We need Ukraine! We won't go anywhere without Ukraine! Take all your stuff and go back to the 1997 [NATO] borders!". Bondarev later resigned over Russia's invasion.

NATO replied to Russia's demands on 25 January. It said "Considering the substantial, unprovoked, unjustified, and ongoing Russian military build-up in and around Ukraine and in Belarus, we call on Russia to immediately de-escalate the situation". NATO offered to improve communication and build trust with Russia, such as negotiating limits on missiles and military exercises, as long as Russia withdrew troops from Ukraine's borders. The alliance rejected Russia's demand to keep Ukraine out of NATO forever, saying this would go against its "open-door policy" and the right of countries to choose their own security. It pointed out that Russia had signed agreements affirming the right of Ukraine and other countries to join alliances. The United States proposed an agreement whereby Russia and the US would not station missiles or troops in Ukraine. To address Russia's concerns about the NATO missile defense system, the US offered to let Russia inspect the bases to confirm they are not a threat.

Russia did not withdraw troops. Despite Russia's announcement on 16 February 2022, that military training in Crimea had stopped and soldiers were returning to their posts, NATO secretary-general Jens Stoltenberg said it appeared that Russia was continuing its military build-up.

== Since the Russian invasion of Ukraine (2022–present) ==
Current NATO and CSTO members in 2025: NATO member states CSTO member states

NATO replied to Russia's ultimatum in January 2022. It rejected some of Russia's demands but offered to negotiate others and to improve military transparency, as long as Russia stopped its military buildup around Ukraine. Putin replied that "Russia's fundamental concerns have been ignored". In his speech on 21 February 2022, Putin again warned that Ukraine's membership of NATO would threaten Russia and that the alliance would use Ukraine to launch a surprise attack. At the time, Ukraine had not applied for NATO membership and was a long way from potentially joining. According to political scientists Michael McFaul and Robert Person, Russia's occupation of Crimea and the Donbas had already blocked Ukraine's NATO membership; they suggested that Putin's real goal was "the end of [Ukraine's] democracy and the return of subjugation".

The Russian government repeatedly denied it would attack Ukraine and accused NATO of "whipping up panic" and "hysteria".

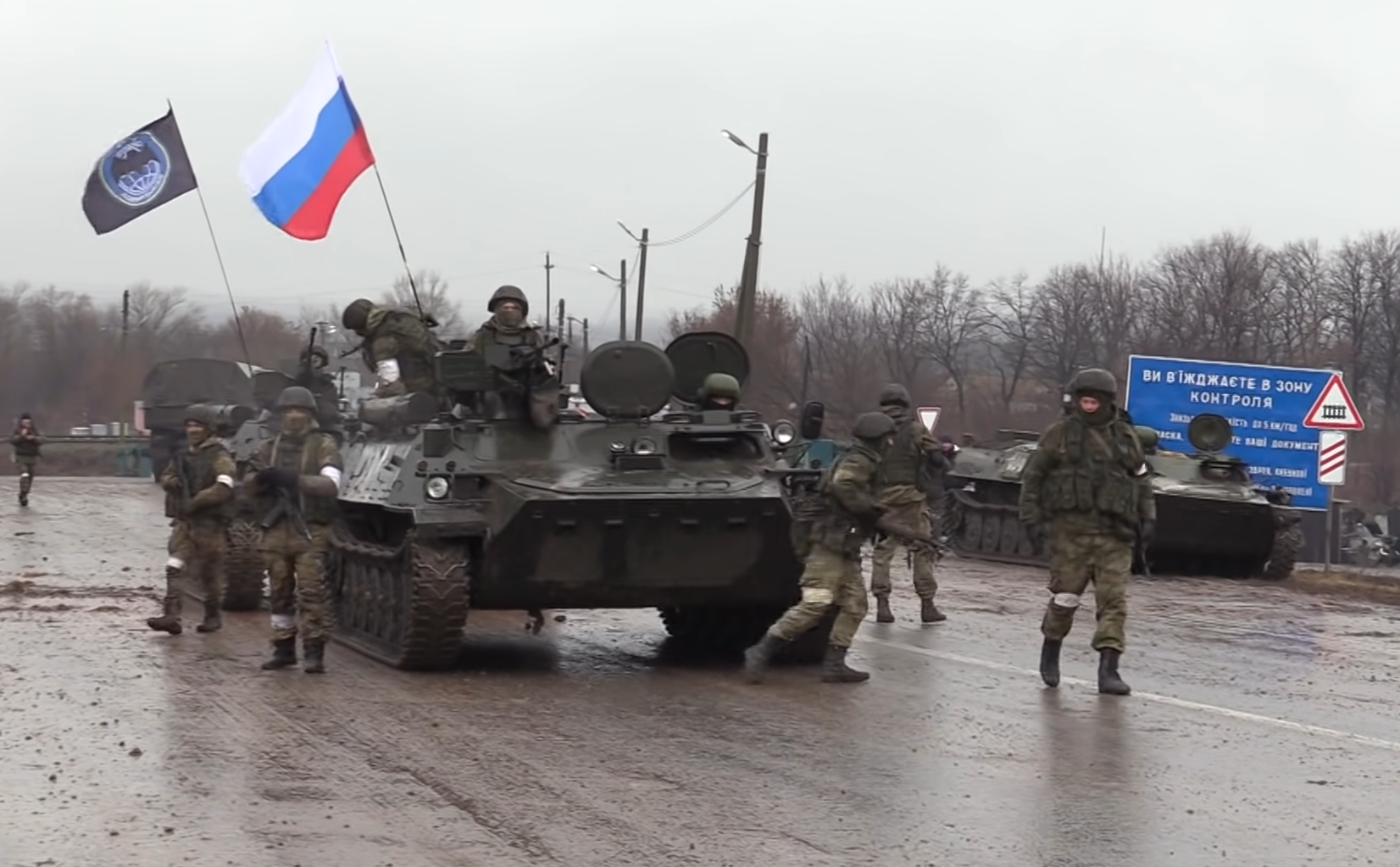
Russian troops in Ukraine early in the 2022 Russian invasion

On 24 February 2022, during a meeting of the United Nations Security Council which was summoned to discuss the crisis, Putin ordered the Russian military to launch a full-scale invasion of Ukraine. It was the largest military attack on a European country since World War II, and further worsened relations between NATO and Russia. In his announcement, Putin falsely claimed that NATO was building up its forces and military infrastructure in Ukraine, threatening Russia, and claimed the Ukrainian military was under NATO control.

NATO issued a statement, saying:

We condemn in the strongest possible terms Russia's horrifying attack on Ukraine, which is entirely unjustified and unprovoked. ... This renewed attack is a grave violation of international law, including the UN Charter, and is wholly contradictory to Russia's commitments in the Helsinki Final Act, the Charter of Paris, the Budapest Memorandum and the NATO-Russia Founding Act. ... Throughout this crisis, NATO, the Allies, and our partners have made every effort to pursue diplomacy and dialogue with Russia and made many substantive proposals. We have repeatedly invited Russia to talks in the NATO-Russia Council. Russia has still not reciprocated. ... We will always maintain our full support for the territorial integrity and sovereignty of Ukraine ... We call on Russia to immediately cease its military action and withdraw all its forces. ... NATO will continue to take all necessary measures to ensure the security and defence of all Allies.

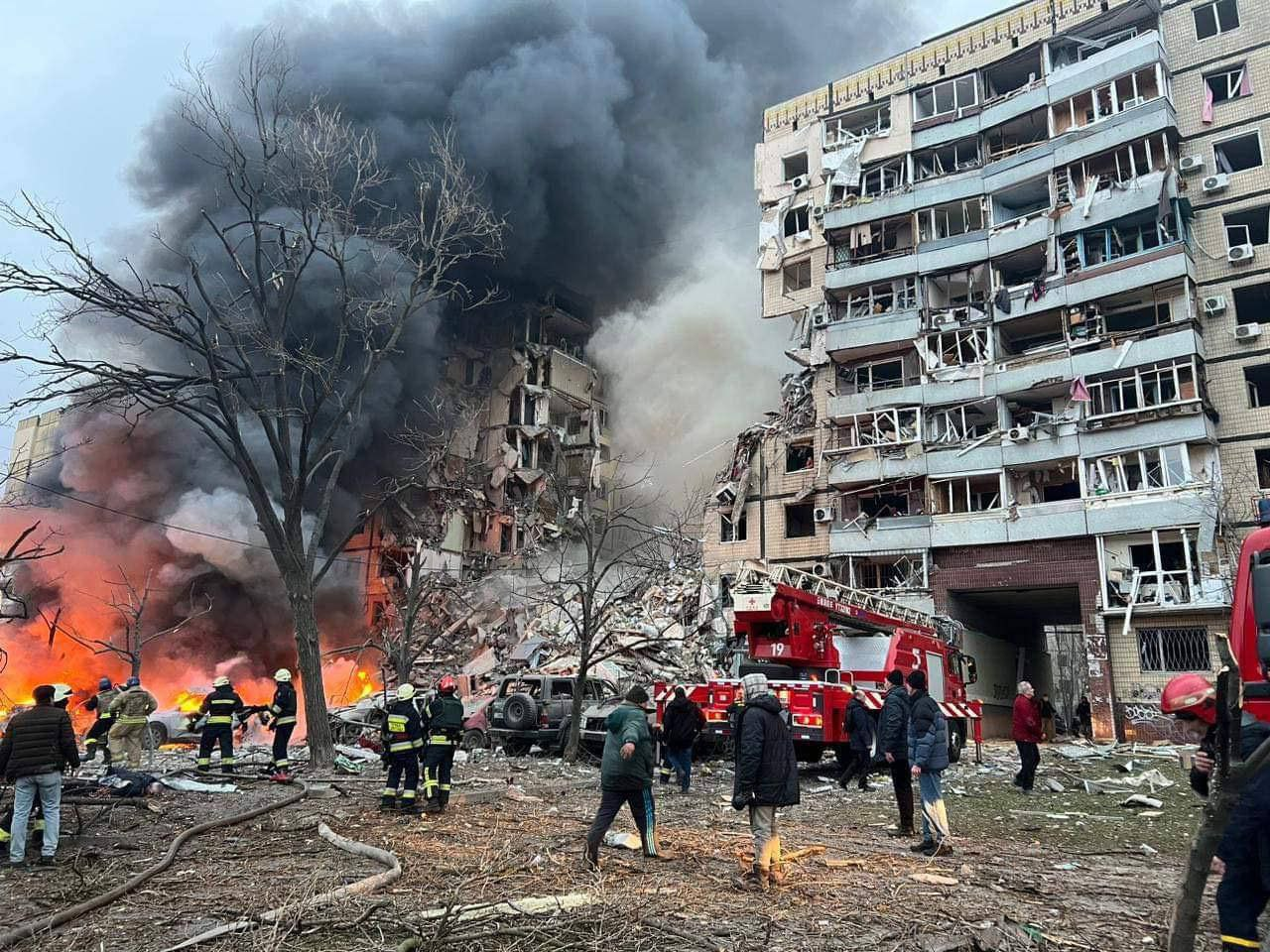
Aftermath of the Russian missile strike on an apartment block in Dnipro (14 January 2023), which killed 46 civilians

Ukraine's government urged NATO to impose a no-fly zone over Ukraine to shield it from ongoing Russian bombing. On 4 March, NATO rejected a no-fly zone, because it could draw NATO into a direct conflict with Russia. Stoltenberg said "We have a responsibility as NATO allies to prevent this war from escalating beyond Ukraine, because that would be even more dangerous, more devastating". Instead, NATO states sent military aid and humanitarian aid to Ukraine.

Because of the invasion, the NATO Response Force deployed troops in Poland, Estonia, Latvia, Lithuania, Slovakia, Hungary and Bulgaria.

Russia's invasion also spurred Finland and Sweden to announce plans to seek NATO membership. On 26 February 2022, Russia issued threats to Finland and Sweden in response. On 16 May 2022, a day after the countries applied for membership, Putin said at a meeting of CSTO:

Russia has no problems with these states [Sweden and Finland], and therefore in this sense the expansion [of NATO] at the expense of these countries does not create a direct threat [...] but the expansion of military infrastructure in this region will certainly cause our response.

— Vladimir Putin

The 2022 NATO Madrid summit declared Russia "a direct threat" to Euro–Atlantic security and approved an increase in the NATO Response Force to 300,000 troops.

Multiple scholars and journalists speculated that the invasion of Ukraine likely marked the beginning of a Second Cold War between NATO and Russia. Peter Dickinson of the Atlantic Council suggested that "Russian dislike of NATO enlargement is real enough, but it has nothing to do with legitimate national security concerns. Instead, Putin objects to NATO because it prevents him from bullying Russia's neighbors". An article published by the Institute for the Study of War concluded:

Putin didn't invade Ukraine in 2022 because he feared NATO. He invaded because he believed that NATO was weak, that his efforts to regain control of Ukraine by other means had failed, and that installing a pro-Russian government in Kyiv would be safe and easy. His aim was not to defend Russia against some non-existent threat but rather to expand Russia's power, eradicate Ukraine's statehood, and destroy NATO.

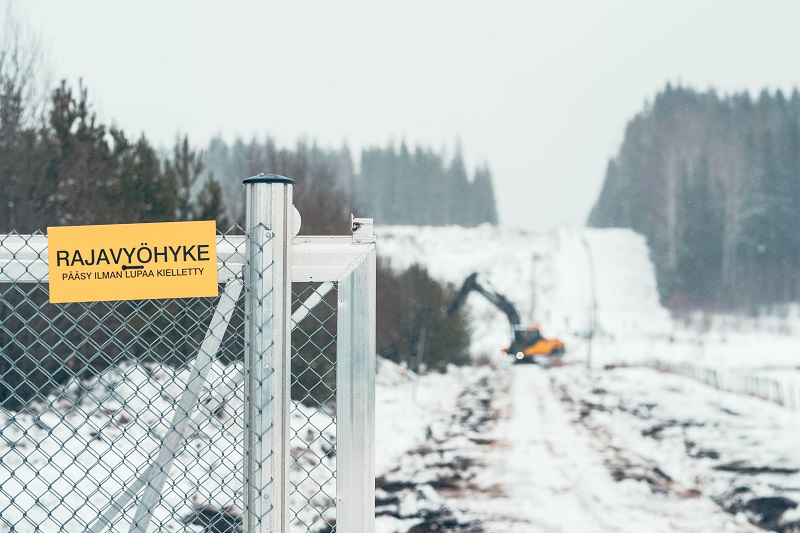
The Finland–Russia border barrier under construction by Finnish authorities in 2023. Finland joined NATO in response to the Russian invasion of Ukraine.

Since the beginning of the war, Russian officials and propagandists have increasingly said that they are "at war" with the whole of NATO, which the alliance has repeatedly denied. Dmitry Medvedev, Putin's deputy on the Security Council of Russia, said in 2024 that "We must do everything so that Ukraine's 'irreversible path' to NATO ends with either the disappearance of Ukraine or the disappearance of NATO. Or even better - the disappearance of both".

On 28 July 2024, Russian president Putin threatened to deploy long-range missiles that could hit all of Europe, after the US announced its intention to deploy long-range missiles in Germany from 2026.

In October 2024, new NATO secretary-general Mark Rutte emphasized the alliance's unwavering support for Ukraine during his visit to the Wiesbaden mission, which will oversee military aid coordination. He stated that NATO will not be intimidated by Russian threats and remains committed to Ukraine's defense.

In April 2025, Russia's foreign intelligence chief, Sergey Naryshkin, issued a threat that Russia would attack NATO countries in the event of NATO "aggression" against Russia or Belarus. He warned that Poland, Lithuania, Latvia and Estonia would be "the first to suffer".

In May 2026, the UK Ministry of Defence announced that two Russian planes had "repeatedly and dangerously" intercepted a British spy plane over the Black Sea the month prior.

On 29 May 2026, a Russian drone crashed into a residential apartment building in the Romanian city of Galați, injuring two people and igniting a fire. The incident occurred during a Russian drone attack on Ukrainian port infrastructure across the Danube River. NATO confirmed the drone was of Russian origin, despite Moscow's denial. In response, Romania expelled the Russian consul stationed in the Black Sea port city of Constanța and closed the consulate there, prompting Russia to threaten retaliation.

On 13 November 2026, the German newspaper Bild reported that Russian negotiators in Abu Dhabi had demanded Finland's withdrawal from NATO and the prohibition of NATO military bases in the Baltic states as conditions for ending the war in Ukraine. Kremlin spokesperson Dmitry Peskov denied that Russia had demanded Finland's withdrawal.

=== Hybrid warfare ===
Since the invasion of Ukraine, there has been an increase in Russian hybrid warfare against NATO and other European countries, aimed at destabilizing the alliance and disrupting support to Ukraine. This has included Russian sabotage operations in Europe, assassination plots, airspace violations, cyberattacks, electronic warfare, and disinformation operations.

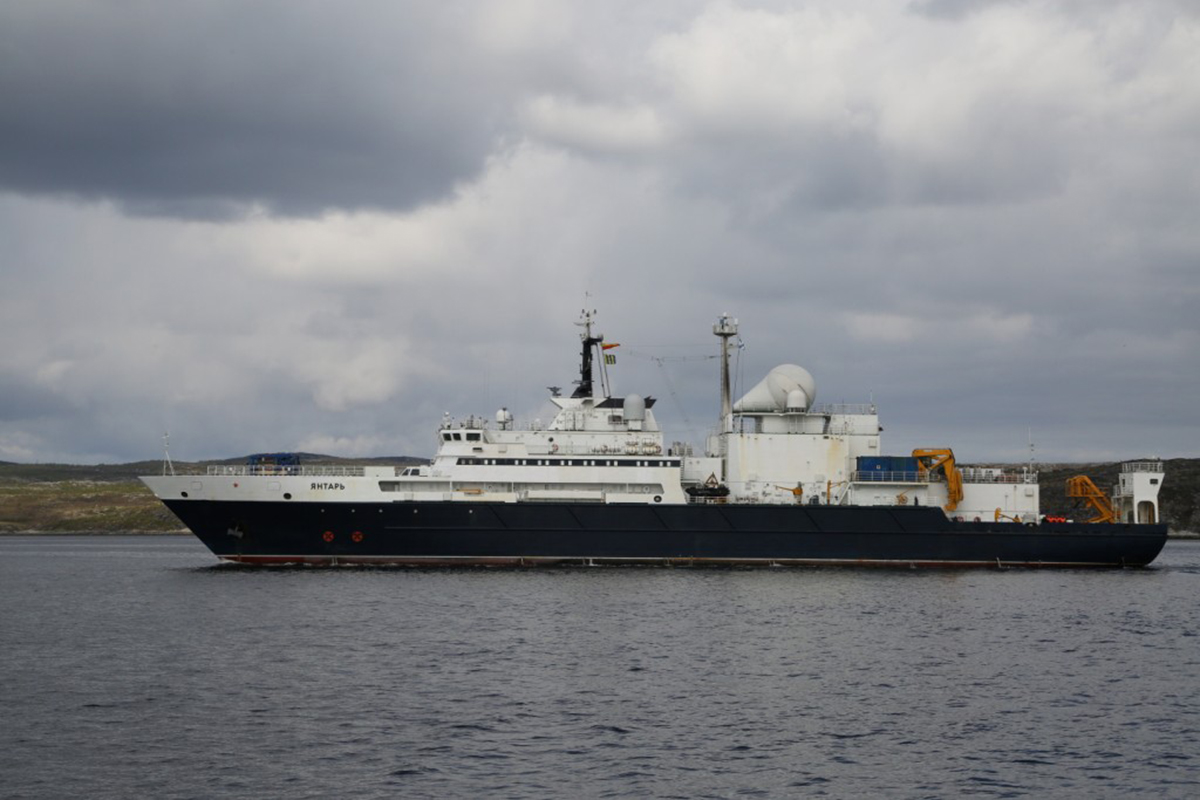
The Yantar, an alleged Russian spy ship

There has been an increase in reported Russian Navy "spy ships" operating in the Baltic Sea, the North Sea, and the seas around Britain and Ireland. Disguised as "research vessels", these ships are believed to be mapping critical undersea communications cables, electricity cables, energy pipelines and offshore wind farms. Some of them are escorted by Russian warships and are fitted with equipment for sabotaging undersea cables. Russian-linked ships have been suspected of cutting several undersea cables in the Baltic.

In 2024, a number of incendiary sabotage attacks were attributed to Russian special services that included posting incendiary bombs with delay fuzes to civilian courier services which resulted in fires in distribution centers in Germany and Britain.

It was revealed in 2024 that American and German intelligence agents foiled a plan by the Russian government to assassinate Armin Papperger, CEO of German arms manufacturer Rheinmetall AG.

Viktor Orbán's government in Hungary has been accused of being the primary "GRU hub" in Europe, facilitating entry of Russian operatives into the EU and hosting an unusually large Russian diplomatic mission. In October 2024 Poland's Internal Security Agency (ABW) stated that there had been an increase in people charged with Russia-linked sabotage and espionage. In October 2024 a collective of investigative journalists, VSquare, published an article describing operations of the 390th Special Purpose Reconnaissance Point, a GRU sabotage unit targeted at NATO countries and based in Kaliningrad.

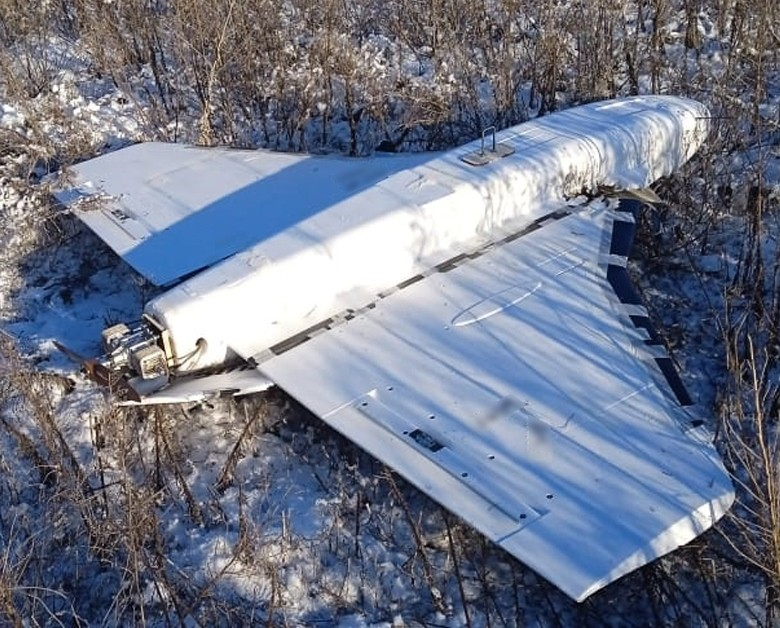
A Gerbera-type drone such as those used in the Russian incursion into Polish air space

On 10 September 2025, at least twenty Russian drones flew into Poland's airspace, during an attack on Ukraine. Polish and NATO aircraft were scrambled, and shot down four of the drones, while the others crashed. Poland's prime minister Donald Tusk called it "an act of aggression" by Russia and "the closest we have been to open conflict since World War II". In response, NATO launched Operation Eastern Sentry to defend its eastern member states from Russian drone incursions. On 19 September, three Russian fighter jets violated Estonia's airspace before being escorted away by NATO jets. Between 22 and 28 September, there were numerous drone sightings in Denmark and Norway over airports, military bases and critical infrastructure. Denmark's prime minister said that Russian involvement could not be ruled out. In response, NATO agreed to bolster its Baltic Sentry operation.

In November 2025, NATO member Poland blamed Russia for a bomb attack on a railway between Warsaw and the Ukrainian border. On 1 December, Giuseppe Cavo Dragone, Chair of the NATO Military Committee, said that a "pre-emptive strike" could be deemed a defensive action to prevent further such attacks. Russia condemned this as an "escalation".

During the Greenland crisis of January 2026, US president Donald Trump threatened to annex Greenland from NATO member Denmark, and to impose tariffs on NATO members for opposing him. Russia welcomed this, saying it was evidence that the transatlantic alliance was collapsing. The Russian government newspaper Rossiyskaya Gazeta praised Trump's push to take over Greenland and welcomed the strain it caused between the US and Europe.

== Possible Russian membership of NATO ==
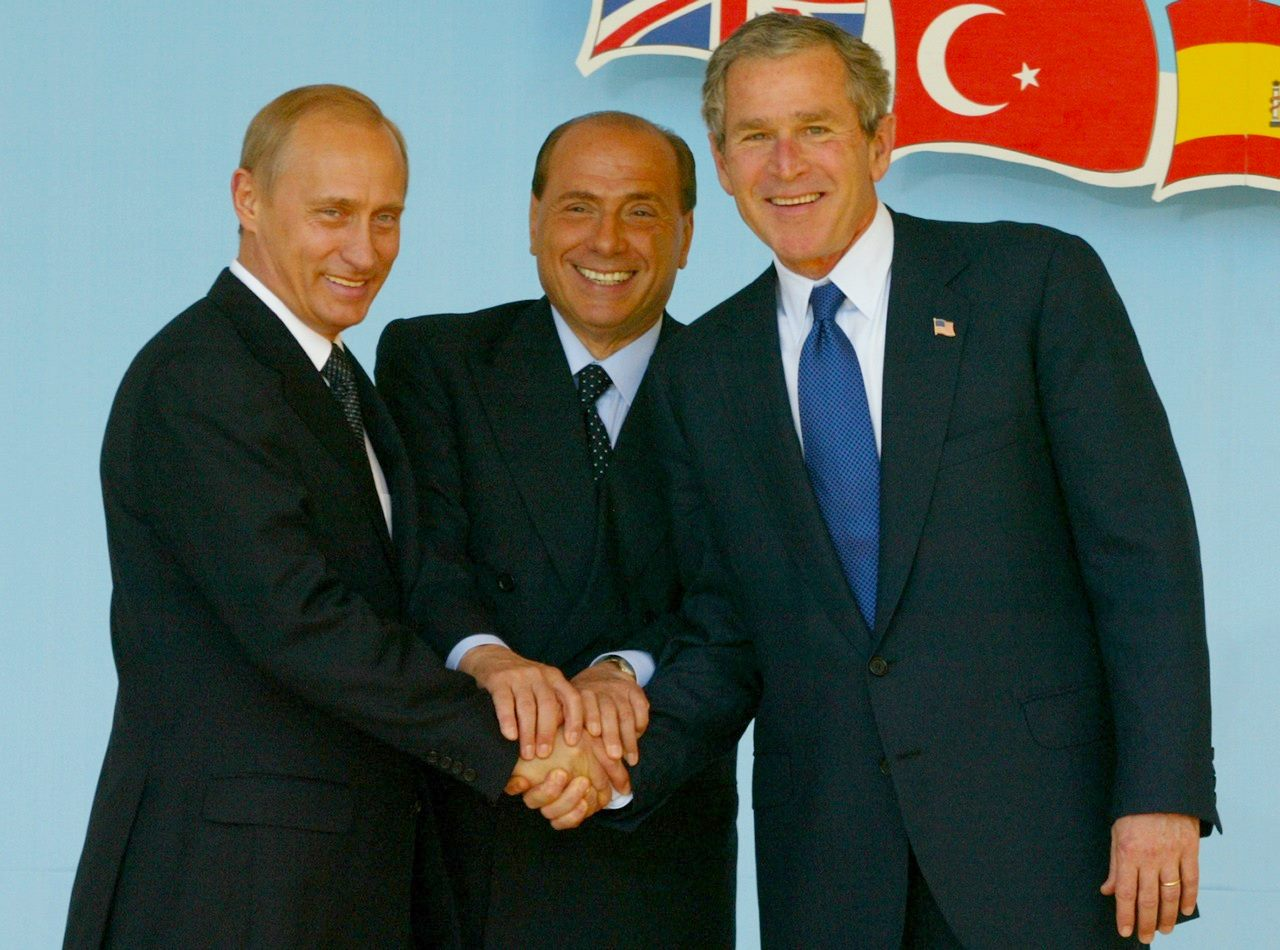
2002 Rome summit

The idea of Russia becoming a NATO member has at times been floated by both Western and Russian leaders, as well as some experts. In December 1991, Boris Yeltsin, President of Russia, sent a letter to NATO asking it to consider accepting Russia as a member of the alliance sometime in the future. Yeltsin wrote that this was a "long-term political goal" that "would contribute to an atmosphere of mutual understanding and trust and would strengthen stability and cooperation on the European continent".

In 1993, US secretary of state James Baker wrote an op-ed calling for NATO leaders to make a plan for including a "democratic Russia" in NATO, arguing that this could help Russian democrats and that Russia could have a "constructive role in European security" through NATO.

On 14 January 1994, Russian president Boris Yeltsin said at a meeting with his American counterpart Bill Clinton in Novo-Ogaryovo: "Russia has to be the first country to join NATO. Then the others from Central and Eastern Europe can come in". Yeltsin added however that Russia was not yet ready to join the alliance.

In the mid-1990s the Russian senior military representative at the NATO military headquarters, Colonel General Leonty Shevtsov, was asked about the possibility of Russia joining NATO. He said it was unlikely in his view, because standardizing NATO and Russian equipment would be impractical. He added that "Russia is not one of these small central European countries with 15-20,000 personnel and 50 tanks, buying its equipment from other nations. Those countries NATO is capable of guiding, with advice and technical assistance, even re-equipping them. But Russia can provide its own equipment."

During a series of interviews with filmmaker Oliver Stone, President Vladimir Putin said that he suggested Russia joining NATO to President Bill Clinton when he visited Moscow in 2000. Putin said in a BBC interview with David Frost just before his first inauguration as Russian president in 2000 that it was hard for him to see NATO as an enemy: "Russia is part of the European culture. And I cannot imagine my own country in isolation from Europe and what we often call the civilized world." In 2000 Putin told George Robertson, Secretary General of NATO at the time, that he wanted Russia to join NATO but would not like to go through the usual application process. According to former NATO secretary general Anders Fogh Rasmussen, in the early days of Putin's presidency around 2000–2001, Putin made many statements suggesting he was favorable to the idea of Russia joining NATO.

On 5 March 2000, in response to a question about his attitude towards NATO, Putin said he could see a closer relationship between Russian and the alliance. "We believe we can talk about more profound integration with NATO, but only if Russia is regarded as an equal partner," he said. Asked if Russia might ever join NATO, he replied: "I do not see why not". Putin said attempts to exclude Russia from the debate over NATO's eastward enlargement had led Moscow to oppose such moves. When asked if he saw NATO as a potential partner, a rival or an enemy, Putin replied that the very question could "cause damage" and would "not do any good to Russia or the world".

Putin, however, later abandoned the ideas of European integration and Western democracy, turning instead to the "Eurasia Movement" and "Putinism" as alternatives to the Western and European ideals espoused by many NATO countries.

In response to a March 2009 suggestion by Polish foreign minister Radosław Sikorski that Russia join NATO, the Russian envoy to NATO, Dmitry Rogozin, said that Russia had not ruled it out, but preferred to continue co-operation with NATO. He emphasized that "Great powers don't join coalitions, they create coalitions. Russia considers itself a great power". However, he said that Russia wanted to be NATO's "partner", provided that Ukraine and Georgia (which Russia had invaded the year before) did not join the alliance. The suggestion of Russia joining NATO was repeated in an open letter co-written in early 2010 by some German defense experts. They posited that Russia was needed in an emerging multi-polar world in order for NATO to counterbalance emerging Asian powers.

Russia Countries on Russia's "Unfriendly Countries List". Countries and territories on the list imposed sanctions against Russia following the Russian invasion of Ukraine in 2022.

Russia Ukraine Countries sending lethal military equipment to Ukraine Countries sending non-lethal military aid to Ukraine

Anders Fogh Rasmussen said in 2019 that "Once Russia can show it is upholding democracy and human rights, NATO can seriously consider its membership." In a 2019 interview with Time Magazine, Sergey Karaganov a close advisor to Putin, said that not inviting Russia to join NATO was "one of the worst mistakes in political history," arguing that it "put Russia and the West on a collision course, eventually sacrificing Ukraine".

Kimberly Marten argued in 2020 that NATO's enlargement made it weaker, not stronger. The bad relations that emerged after 2009 were mostly caused by Russian reaction to its declining influence in world affairs. Russia's strong negative reaction was manipulated and magnified by both Russian nationalists and by Putin, as ammunition in their domestic political battles. Marten believes the Russian leaderships' views of world politics "are deeply rooted in realist approaches to international relations" and she says they perceive "a major external military risk in NATO's bringing the military infrastructure of its member countries near the borders of the Russian Federation; likewise, with further [formal] expansion of the Alliance." This, she says, provides a threat-based legitimacy that allows Russian leaders to consolidate their domestic position, implement harsh anti-democratic measures, and justify a military build-up and aggressive actions abroad.

== Trade and economy ==
Russia periodically blocked navigation via the Strait of Baltiysk in the 1990s. Since 2006 it has imposed a continuous blockade (both for Poland and the Russian Kaliningrad Oblast), despite entering in 2009 an international agreement concerning this matter. As a result, Poland started to consider digging another canal across the Vistula Spit in order to circumvent this restriction, and ultimately built the Vistula Spit canal in 2019–2022.

The Russian economy is heavily dependent on the export of natural resources such as oil and natural gas, and Russia has used these resources to its advantage. Russia and the western countries signed in 1991 the Energy Charter Treaty establishing a multilateral framework for cross-border cooperation in the energy industry, principally the fossil fuel industry; Russia, however, postponed its ratification, linking it to the adoption of the Energy Charter Treaty Transit Protocol. Starting in 2005, Russia and Ukraine had several disputes in which Russia threatened to cut off the supply of gas. As a great deal of Russia's gas is exported to Europe through the pipelines crossing Ukraine, those disputes affected several NATO countries. While Russia claimed the disputes had arisen from Ukraine's failure to pay its bills, Russia may also have been motivated by a desire to punish the pro-Western government that came to power after the Orange Revolution. In December 2006, Russia indicated that the ratification of the Energy Charter Treaty was unlikely due to the provisions requiring third-party access to Russia's pipelines. On 20 August 2009, Russia officially informed the depository of the Energy Charter Treaty (the Government of Portugal) that it did not intend to become a contracting party to the treaty. Russian gas exports came to be viewed as a weapon against NATO countries, and the US and other Western countries have worked to lessen the dependency of Europe on Russia and its resources.

In 1998, Russia joined the G8, a forum of eight large developed countries, six of which are members of NATO, until being expelled in 2014. In 2012, Russia joined the World Trade Organization, an organization of governments committed to reducing tariffs and other trade barriers. These increased economic ties gave Russia access to new markets and capital, as well as political clout in the West and other countries. While Russia's new role in the global economy presented Russia with several opportunities, it also made the Russian Federation more vulnerable to external economic trends and pressures. Like many other countries, Russia's economy suffered during the Great Recession.

Following its annexation of Crimea, several countries (including most of NATO) imposed sanctions on Russia, hurting the Russian economy by cutting off access to capital. As a further consequence, Russia has also been expelled from the G8. At the same time, the global price of oil declined. The combination of international sanctions and the falling crude price in 2014 and thereafter resulted in the 2014–16 Russian financial crisis. Following the 2022 Russian invasion of Ukraine, NATO members imposed further sanctions against Russia. Russia retaliated by placing member states of NATO (except Turkey) on a list of "unfriendly countries" along with other Western states.

== Russia's foreign relations with NATO member states ==
- Albania
- Belgium
- Bulgaria
- Canada
- Croatia
- Czech Republic
- Denmark
- Estonia
- Finland
- France
- Germany
- Greece
- Hungary
- Iceland
- Italy
- Latvia
- Lithuania
- Luxembourg
- Montenegro
- Netherlands
- North Macedonia
- Norway
- Poland
- Portugal
- Romania
- Slovakia
- Slovenia
- Spain
- Sweden
- Turkey
- United Kingdom
- United States

== See also ==
- Foreign relations of Russia
- Foreign relations of NATO
- Enlargement of NATO
- NATO open door policy
- Armenia–NATO relations
- Azerbaijan–NATO relations
- Belarus–NATO relations
- Georgia–NATO relations
- Moldova–NATO relations
- Ukraine–NATO relations
- Russia–Ukraine relations
- Russia–United States relations
- Russian invasion of Ukraine
- Russia–European Union relations
- Ukraine–Commonwealth of Independent States relations
