= Sam Greene (academic) =

Sam Greene is a British academic; professor in Russian politics and director of the Russia Institute at King's College London, which he founded in 2012. This followed 13 years in Moscow, first as deputy director of the Carnegie Moscow Center and later at the New Economic School as founder-director of the Centre of the Study of New Media & Society.

Greene earned a PhD in political sociology from the London School of Economics.

== Publications ==
- Moscow in Movement: Power and Opposition in Putin's Russia (Stanford University Press, 2014)
- Putin v. the People: The Perilous Politics of a Divided Russia (Yale University Press, with Graeme Robertson, 2019)
