= Boris Bondarev =

Russian diplomat (born 1980)

- Борис Бондарев
- Born: 1980 (age 45–46); Russian SFSR, Soviet Union
- Occupation: Diplomat
- Employer: Russian Ministry of Foreign Affairs

Boris Bondarev (Russian: Борис Бондарев; born 1980) is a former Russian diplomat who worked for the Russian permanent mission to the United Nations Office at Geneva from 2019 until his resignation in May 2022 in protest over the Russian invasion of Ukraine.

== Early life and education ==
Bondarev was born in 1980 to middle class parents of the Soviet intelligentsia. His father was an economist at the foreign trade ministry while his mother taught English at the Moscow State Institute of Foreign Relations. His maternal grandfather was a general during World War II and was recognized as a Hero of the Soviet Union. He grew up in Moscow except for a brief time from 1984 until 1985 when his father was assigned to a Swiss-Russian venture, and the family lived in Switzerland. In 1991, his father left the foreign trade ministry and started a small business.

Bondarev studied at the Moscow State Institute of Foreign Relations at a time when discourse was still open. In the summer of 2000, he began an internship at the Russian Ministry of Foreign Affairs.

== Career ==
In 2002, Bondarev began working for the Russian Ministry of Foreign Affairs in Moscow and became an assistant attaché at the Russian embassy in Cambodia under Viacheslav Loukianov. In 2011, he worked at the Mongolian embassy; because his wife, the embassy's chief office manager, did not vote during the 2011 parliamentary and the following presidential election she was subjected to harassment.

Bondarev then became advisor on nuclear non-proliferation. He recalls at the time of the March 2014 annexation of the Crimea being at the International Export Control Conference in Dubai and "left in the dark" about the motives. According to him in the aftermath "the tenor of statements—internal and external—grew more antagonistic" and that "Soviet-style propaganda had fully returned to Russian diplomacy".

In 2019, he became a counsellor of the Russian Federation's mission to the United Nations Office at Geneva and other international organizations in Switzerland. In a treaty to rework NATO January 2022, Moscow proposed that NATO withdraw all troops and weapons from countries which joined after 1997, i.e. Bulgaria, the Czech Republic, Poland, and the Baltic states.

On 23 May 2022, Bondarev announced that he had resigned from his position in protest over the Russian invasion of Ukraine, referring to the invasion as an "aggressive war", saying that it was not only a crime against the Ukrainian people, but also "the most serious crime against the people of Russia, with a bold letter Z crossing out all hopes and prospects for a prosperous free society in our country".

According to Reuters, Bondarev stated that he had several times expressed his concerns about the invasion with senior embassy staff but was told to keep his "mouth shut in order to avoid ramifications". He also said that he did not expect other diplomats to follow, and that the goal of the organizers of the war was "to remain in power forever". The former head of the Munich Security Conference and ex-diplomat Wolfgang Ischinger proposed to allow Bondarev to speak at the World Economic Forum in Davos, Switzerland.

On 24 May 2022, Kremlin spokesman Dmitry Peskov told journalists when asked about the statements: "We in the Kremlin are unfamiliar with this letter. If he was an employee of the ministry of foreign affairs, this is probably a question for the MFA". He also stated that "this gentleman opposed the general consolidated opinion of our country".

In February 2025, Bondarev said of Donald Trump's attempts to negotiate peace in Ukraine that Trump has no leverage over Putin and "Putin is convinced that he has already won and will get what he wants — whether Trump is involved or not."

== Personal life ==
Bondarev is married. In 2022, his wife worked at a Moscow-based industrial association and visited him in February in Geneva when the war broke out. She travelled back to Moscow to get their cat, which needed to be neutered and vaccinated, before he could resign. He claimed that she had to take three flights, two cab rides, and cross the Lithuanian border twice—both times on foot.

== See also ==
- Anatoly Chubais, senior Kremlin adviser who resigned his positions in March 2022
- Protests against the Russo-Ukrainian war (2022–present)#Politicians and government officials
