= Ukraine–NATO Civic League =

Ukrainian non-governmental organization

NATO-Ukraine Civic League
- Founded: September 2003
- Type: Non-governmental organization
- Purpose: Ukraine–NATO Partnership
- Location: Ukraine
- Region served: national
- Method: Partnership Network of NGOs (associations of citizens) which support Euro-Atlantic/European course of Ukraine
- Key people: Serhiy Dzherdzh (Head of the Coordination Council)
- Website: http://www.ua-nato.org.ua

NATO-Ukraine Civic League (Ukrainian: Громадська ліга Україна — НАТО) is a Ukrainian non-governmental organization (NGO) that aims to facilitate partnership and networking between NGOs (associations of citizens) which support Euro-Atlantic/European course of Ukraine.

== History ==
NATO-Ukraine Civic League was established in September 26, 2003 as independent community organization; 26 NGOs joined the League on the day of its establishment. As of 2015, the league has 48 member NGOs.

Ukrainian Integration into NATO: working together, the First All-Ukraine NGO's Assembly of NATO-Ukraine Civic League in Kyiv, Ukraine took place on October 20, 2003. George Robertson, Secretary General of NATO taken part in Assembly.

Since April 27, 2006, the Head of the Coordination Council of the NATO-Ukraine League is Serhiy Dzherdzh, Ph.D..

The League has organised round-table discussions and workshops for Ukrainian non-governmental organizations to explore national security issues and defense reforms in Ukraine.

== Statutory mission ==
The Partnership Network activities should make a substantial impact on development of positive attitude of people to the strategic direction of defense and security policy implementation in Ukraine.

It is also expected to:

- Increase public engagement and involvement of NGOs into discussing key issues of Ukraine’s defense and security;
- Promote active participation of public authorities in activities aimed at informing public on the current status of NATO transformation and Ukraine’s Euro-Atlantic course;
- Raise awareness of the society concerning the collective security system, NATO in particular, and cooperation between Ukraine and the Alliance;
- Increase the number of supporters of the future Ukrainian membership in the Alliance, first of all among representatives of security sector, decommissioned military personnel, defense industry and military servicemen family members;
- Strengthen support of Euro-Atlantic aspirations of Ukraine by political parties, movements and various mass media.

== See also ==
- Ukraine–NATO relations
