= 1995 Kharkiv drinking water disaster =

Water contamination event in Ukraine

On June 29, 1995, the drinking water supply in Kharkiv, Ukraine was polluted due to flooding. Tap water was cut off in the city for about a month.

== Chronology ==
On June 29, 1995, torrential rain flooded the streets of Kharkiv. The Dykanivka wastewater treatment plant was flooded as well, since it was designed to collect water from the city's storm drains along with sewage. This resulted in spill of polluted and untreated water into the nearby Udy River. To prevent further spillage, the local authorities stopped tap water supply for the entire city until water was pumped out of the flooded well and pumps were replaced. It took about a month to resume supply of treated tap water. During this period the local authorities established limited drinking water distribution to organizations (including hospitals) and the population. Drinking water was brought up by tank trucks to designated areas for distribution. Several international organizations including NATO provided assistance. This was the first instance of cooperation between NATO and Ukraine.
