= NATO–Ukraine Council =

Organisation established in 2023

NATO-Ukraine Council Conseil OTAN-Ukraine
- Рада «Україна-НАТО»
- NUC logo

- Location within NATO
- Abbreviation: NUC; COU; РУН
- Predecessor: NATO-UKR commission
- Formation: July 12, 2023, 3 years ago
- Founder: NATO
- Founded at: Vilnius, Lithuania
- Type: Joint collaborative advisory board, consultative forum
- Legal status: Multinational, active
- Purpose: UKR–NATO relations
- Headquarters: NATO Headquarters
- Location: Haren, BE-BRU
- Coordinates: 50.87931°N 4.42611°E
- Members: 33 countries: Albania; Belgium; Bulgaria; Canada; Croatia; Czech Republic; Denmark; Estonia; Finland; France; Germany; Greece; Hungary; Iceland; Italy; Latvia; Lithuania; Luxembourg; Montenegro; Netherlands; North Macedonia; Norway; Poland; Portugal; Romania; Slovakia; Slovenia; Spain; Sweden; Turkey; Ukraine; United Kingdom; United States; (2025)
- Official languages: English/French/Ukrainian
- Secretary General: Secretary General of NATO (ex officio)
- Chair: Mark Rutte; Jens Stoltenberg (first, till 1 October 2024)
- Sub-structures: 5 subcommittees, informal working groups
- Main organ: Council meeting
- Website: Official website
- Remarks: NUC subcommittees meet regularly
- List of meetings, Brussels (unless stated otherwise): Summit, Vilnius, Lithuania; Ambassadors (crisis) (Note: requested by Ukraine); Ambassadors; Military Representatives; Foreign Ministers; Ambassadors (crisis); Foreign Ministers; 2024 NATO Summit, US-DC; Ambassadors (crisis); Ambassadors; Ambassadors (crisis); 12 Jul 2023; 26 Jul 2023; 4 Oct 2023; 16 Nov 2023; 29 Nov 2023; 10 Jan 2024; 4 Apr 2024; 11 Jul 2024; 26 Nov 2024; 29 Jan 2025; 2 Sep 2025

The NATO–Ukraine Council (abbr. NUC, Ukrainian: Рада "НАТО-Україна", romanized: Rada 'NATO-Ukraina', also known as Рада "Україна-НАТО", РУН) is a collaborative body established in July 2023 during the NATO summit in Vilnius, replacing the NATO-Ukraine Commission. It serves as a platform where NATO allies and Ukraine engage as equal participants to advance political dialogue, enhance cooperation, and support Ukraine's aspirations for NATO membership. The NUC facilitates joint consultations, decision-making, and coordinated activities, including crisis consultations between NATO and Ukraine. The Council was established in the backdrop of a more than year-long Russia-Ukraine war, in which NATO sought to deepen its support for Ukraine.

== Background ==
The NATO–Ukraine Council (NUC) was established at the 2023 NATO Summit in Vilnius, replacing the NATO-Ukraine Commission, which had been the primary body for developing NATO-Ukraine relations since 1997. The Commission, formed the same year by the NATO-Ukraine Charter on a Distinctive Partnership at a signing in Madrid, served as the primary decision-making body for NATO-Ukraine relations. In December 2008, the foreign ministers of NATO countries introduced the Annual National Programme (ANP) to further support Ukraine's reform efforts.

According to an official NATO communique from the 2023 summit, the new NUC format presents Ukraine and NATO allies as "equal members to advance political dialogue, engagement, cooperation, and Ukraine's Euro-Atlantic aspirations for membership in NATO". NATO's official literature adds that the Council framework upgrades Ukraine to a first-among-equals participant alongside all NATO members, contrasted with its prior status as a NATO partner in the Commission format. NUC is chaired by NATO's Secretary General and can be convened by any member, including Ukraine, for crisis consultations, whereas the predecessor format required that Ukraine be invited by NATO to participate in joint events.

The transition from the ANP to the NUC at the 2023 NATO summit was interpreted by observers such as the U.S.-based think tank Atlantic Council as a sign of Ukraine's deepening cooperation with NATO and an additional means for strengthening its membership bid. According to the British policy centre Chatham House, Ukraine's Council designation created a stronger framework for joint consultations, decision-making, and crisis management between the parties.

== Post-establishment developments and meetings ==
The inaugural meeting of the NATO–Ukraine Council was held on 12 July 2023 at NATO's 2023 summit. The Council met at the level of Heads of State and Government, thereby including the participation of Ukrainian President Volodymyr Zelenskyy.

On 10 January 2024, NATO virtually convened a meeting of the new Ukraine Council on the request of Ukraine amidst escalated Russian attacks on Ukrainian civilians and infrastructure. This followed NATO members' further pledging of additional air defence systems to Ukraine. Following the meeting, NATO committed to investing "billions of euros of further capabilities" for Ukraine throughout the year.

On 4 April 2025, another meeting of the Council took place at the NATO headquarters in Brussels with the participation of Ukrainian Foreign Minister Dmytro Kuleba, and was focused on long-term support for Kyiv.

There have been several other, lower-lever NUC meetings of note since the framework's establishment. On 16 November 2023, the NUC held its first meeting in the Military Representatives format. The meeting featured the Ukrainian military representative briefing the Council on battlefield developments against the Russian Armed Forces, as well as Ukrainian military capacities to further continue fighting. The NUC convened on 29 November 2023 at the level of Foreign Ministers for the first time, addressing topics such as harmonising Ukraine's interoperability with NATO and continued alliance support for the Ukrainian war effort.

On 26 November 2024, following Russia's first-time use of the Oreshnik intermediate range ballistic missile (IRBM) in airstrikes on Dnipro, the NUC conferred at NATO headquarters, with Ukrainian military officials remotely joining to brief the Council on the attack and request additional air defences. Members of NUC's Political Affairs Committee convened at Ukraine's request on 1 September 2025, following a rise in Russian attacks against Ukraine cities, including a combined drone and missile strike on Kyiv that killed 25 people. The Ukrainian side in this meeting was led by Deputy Defence Minister Serhii Boyev and Deputy Internal Affairs Minister Oleksii Serhieiev, who reported increase Russian weapons production and continued Iranian and North Korean military assistance to Russia.

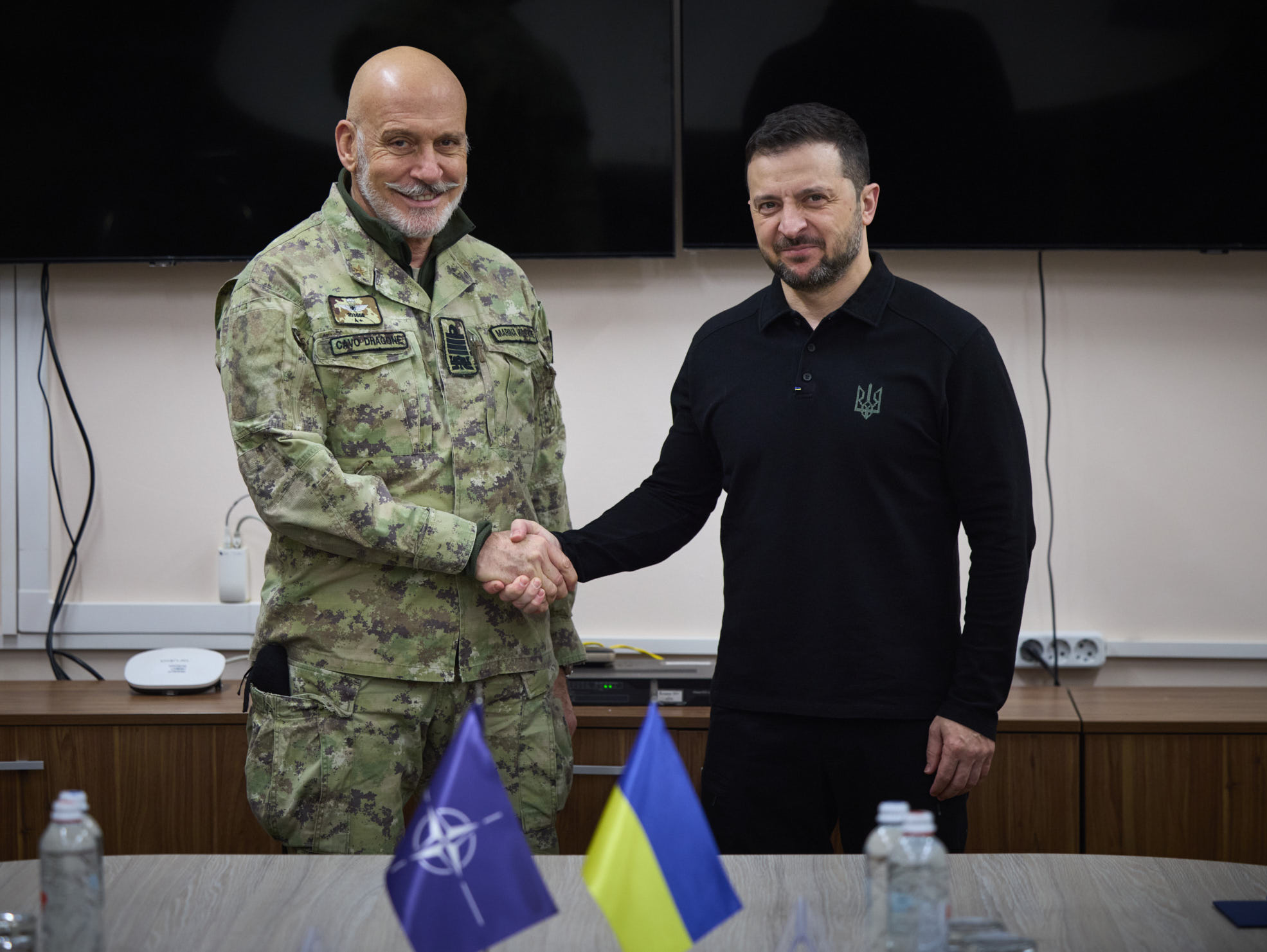
President Volodymyr Zelenskyy met the Chair of the NATO Military Committee, Giuseppe Cavo Dragone on his first foreign visit in this position to Ukraine. Kyiv, 8 February 2025.

== Sub-structures ==
The NATO–Ukraine Council includes five primary sub-committees:

- The Political Affairs Committee – NUC(PAC) – consults on political and security-related subjects.
- The Defence and Security Sector Committee – NUC (DSSC) – oversees the practical implementation of NATO's Comprehensive Assistance Package for Ukraine, with a focus on the defence and security sectors.
- The Strategic Communications Committee – NUC(SCC) – supports Ukraine's efforts in this area and helps coordinate NATO's strategic communications approach to and with Ukraine.
- The Innovation and Hybrid Committee – NUC (IHC) – oversees cooperation on innovation, hybrid threats, cyber defence, energy security, and environmental security.
- The Military Representatives Working Group – NUC (MR-WG) – exchanges views and discusses the practical implementation of NATO-Ukraine military cooperation, with a focus on the capability development and interoperability of the Armed Forces of Ukraine.

== See also ==
- Ukraine-NATO relations
- 2023 Vilnius summit
- 2024 Washington summit
- NATO Security Assistance and Training for Ukraine
- Coalition of the willing (Russo-Ukrainian War)
