= Ukraine–NATO relations =

- NATO: Ukraine

Relations between Ukraine and the North Atlantic Treaty Organization (NATO) were established in 1991, following Ukraine's independence after the dissolution of the Soviet Union. Ukraine–NATO ties gradually strengthened during the 1990s and 2000s, when Ukraine aimed to eventually join the alliance. Although co-operating with NATO, Ukraine remained a neutral country. Ukraine has increasingly sought NATO membership after it was attacked by Russia in 2014 and again in 2022. In response to Russia's attacks, NATO has increased its support for, and co-operation with, Ukraine.

Ukraine joined NATO's Partnership for Peace in 1994. The NATO–Ukraine Commission was founded in 1997, tasked with developing the NATO–Ukraine relationship. Ukraine joined NATO's Intensified Dialogue program in 2005. At the 2008 Bucharest summit, NATO declined to offer Ukraine a Membership Action Plan, but said that Ukraine would eventually join the alliance. In 2010, during the presidency of Viktor Yanukovych, the Ukrainian parliament voted to abandon the goal of NATO membership and re-affirm Ukraine's neutral status, while continuing its co-operation with NATO. In the February 2014 Ukrainian Revolution, Ukraine's parliament voted to remove Yanukovych, but the new government did not seek to change its neutral status. Russia then occupied and annexed Crimea. In August 2014, Russia's military invaded eastern Ukraine to support its separatist proxies. Because of this, in December 2014, Ukraine's parliament voted to seek NATO membership, and in 2018 it voted to enshrine this goal in its constitution. NATO condemned Russia's actions and affirmed its support for Ukraine's sovereignty; a few NATO members began helping Ukraine's military of their own accord.

Russian opposition to Ukrainian NATO membership has grown during the Russo–Ukrainian war. In late 2021, there was a massive Russian military buildup around Ukraine. Russia's Foreign Ministry demanded that Ukraine be barred from ever joining NATO. NATO secretary general Jens Stoltenberg replied that the decision was up to Ukraine and NATO's members, adding, "Russia has no right to establish a sphere of influence to try to control their neighbors." Russia invaded Ukraine in February 2022 after Russia's president, Vladimir Putin, falsely claimed that NATO was using Ukraine to threaten his country. Ukraine applied for NATO membership in September 2022 after Russia proclaimed it had annexed the country's southeast. NATO stated its unwavering support for Ukraine. It established the NATO–Ukraine Council in 2023 and the NATO Security Assistance and Training for Ukraine in 2024.

Polls held before 2014 found little support amongst Ukrainians for NATO membership. Public support for NATO membership has risen greatly since 2022.

== History ==
Ukraine's Declaration of Sovereignty, adopted by parliament in 1990, declared it had the "intention of becoming a permanently neutral state that does not participate in military blocs and adheres to three nuclear free principles" (art. 9).

=== Presidency of Leonid Kravchuk (1991–1994) ===
Relations between Ukraine and NATO were formally established in 1992, when Ukraine joined the North Atlantic Cooperation Council after regaining its independence, later renamed the Euro-Atlantic Partnership Council. On 22 and 23 February 1992, NATO secretary-general Manfred Wörner paid an official visit to Kyiv, and on 8 July 1992, Kravchuk visited NATO Headquarters in Brussels. An important event in the development of relations between Ukraine and NATO was the opening in September 1992 of the Embassy of Ukraine in Brussels, which was a link in contacts between Ukraine and NATO.

A few years later, in February 1994, Ukraine was the first post-Soviet country to conclude a framework agreement with NATO in the framework of the Partnership for Peace initiative, supporting the initiative of Central and Eastern European countries to join NATO.

=== Presidency of Leonid Kuchma (1994–2005) ===
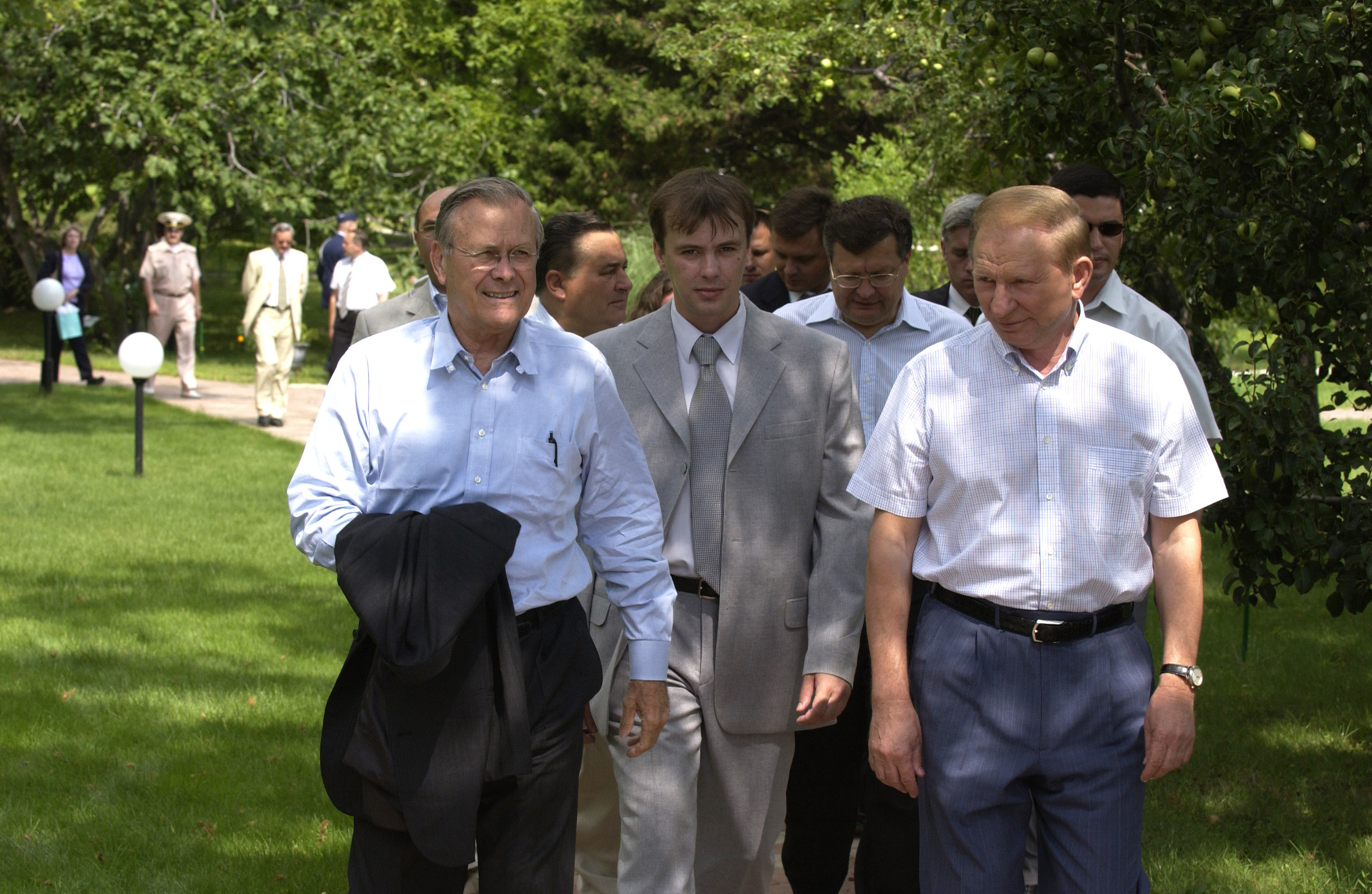
US Secretary of Defense Donald Rumsfeld and President of Ukraine Leonid Kuchma. Partenit, Autonomous Republic of Crimea, 13 August 2004.

Leonid Kuchma, who became president in July 1994, signed the quadripartite Memorandum on security assurances in connection with Ukraine's accession to the Treaty on the Non-Proliferation of Nuclear Weapons on 5 December. The memorandum prohibited the Russian Federation, the United Kingdom and the United States from threatening or using military force or economic coercion against Ukraine, "except in self-defence or otherwise in accordance with the Charter of the United Nations." As a result of other agreements and the memorandum, between 1993 and 1996, Ukraine gave up its nuclear weapons.

In the summer of 1995, Ukraine requested help to mitigate consequences of the Kharkiv drinking water disaster to the UN Department of Humanitarian Affairs and to NATO. Various NATO countries and other organizations stepped up with medical and civil engineering assistance. This was the first cooperation between NATO and Ukraine.

The Constitution of Ukraine, adopted in 1996 and based upon the Ukrainian Proclamation of Independence of 24 August 1991, contained the basic principles of non-coalition and future neutrality.

Kuchma and Russian president Boris Yeltsin negotiated terms for dividing the Black Sea Fleet based in Ukraine's Crimean peninsula, signing an interim treaty on 10 June 1995. But Moscow mayor Yury Luzhkov campaigned to claim the city of Sevastopol which housed the fleet's headquarters and main naval base, and in December the Russian Federation Council officially endorsed the claim. These Russian nationalist territorial claims spurred Ukraine to propose a "special partnership" with NATO in January 1997. On 7 May 1997, the official NATO Information and Documentation Center opened in Kyiv; the Center aimed to foster transparency about the alliance. A Ukrainian public opinion poll of 6 May showed 37% in favor of joining NATO with 28% opposed and 34% undecided. On 9 July 1997, a NATO–Ukraine Commission was established.

In 1998, the NATO–Ukraine Joint Working Group on Defence Reform was established. This sought to reform Ukraine's large conscript forces into a smaller, more mobile and professional force and strengthen civilian control of Ukraine's armed forces and security institutions.

In 2002, relations of the governments of the United States and other NATO countries with Ukraine deteriorated after the Cassette Scandal revealed that Ukraine allegedly transferred a sophisticated Ukrainian defense system to Saddam Hussein's Iraq. At the NATO enlargement summit in November 2002, the NATO–Ukraine commission adopted a NATO–Ukraine Action Plan. President Kuchma's declaration that Ukraine wanted to join NATO (also in 2002) and the sending of Ukrainian troops to Iraq in 2003 could not mend relations between Kuchma and NATO. Until 2006 the Ukrainian Armed Forces worked with NATO in Iraq. Most officials believed it would be too risky to allow Ukraine to join NATO as it would upset Russia greatly.

On 6 April 2004, parliament adopted a law on the free access of NATO forces to the territory of Ukraine. On 15 June 2004, in the second edition of the Military Doctrine of Ukraine, approved by President Kuchma, a provision appeared on the implementation by Ukraine of a policy of Euro-Atlantic integration, the ultimate goal of which was to join NATO. However, already on 15 July 2004, following a meeting of the Ukraine–NATO commission, Kuchma issued a decree stating that joining NATO was no longer the country's goal – only "a significant deepening of relations with NATO and the European Union as guarantors of security and stability in Europe."

=== Presidency of Viktor Yushchenko (2005–2010) ===
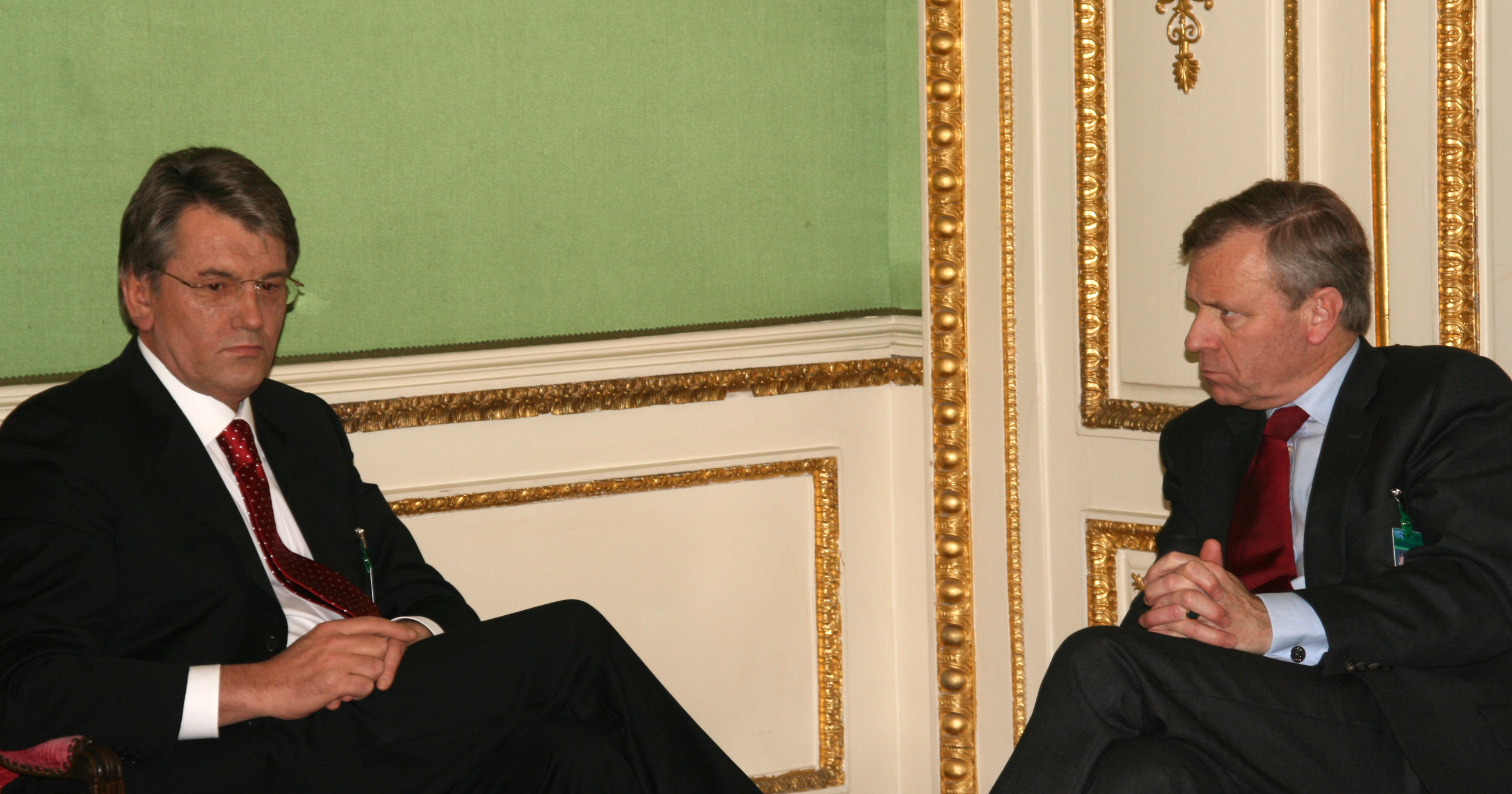
Ukrainian President Viktor Yushchenko (left) with NATO Secretary General Jaap de Hoop Scheffer in 2007

After the Orange Revolution in 2004, Kuchma was replaced by President Viktor Yushchenko, who is a keen supporter of Ukraine's NATO membership.

In April 2005, Viktor Yushchenko returned to Ukraine's military doctrine the strategic goal of "full membership in NATO and the European Union". The new text read as follows: "Based on the fact that NATO and the EU are the guarantors of security and stability in Europe, Ukraine is preparing for full membership in these organizations." As in the previous version, the task of "deeply reforming the defense sphere of the state in accordance with European standards" was called "one of the most important priorities of domestic and foreign policy." On 21 April 2005 in Vilnius, as part of an informal meeting of the Foreign Ministers of the NATO countries, a meeting of the Ukraine–NATO Commission was held, which opened a new stage in Ukraine's relations with the alliance – "intensive dialogue", which was intended to be the first step towards Ukraine's entry into NATO. During President Viktor Yushchenko's first official visit to the United States, President George W. Bush declared: "I am a supporter of the idea of Ukraine's membership in NATO." A joint official statement by the presidents of Ukraine and the United States said that Washington supported the proposal to start an intensified dialogue on Ukraine's accession to the NATO.

On 20 January 2006 in Budapest, following a meeting of defense ministers of Central European countries – NATO members Hungary, the Czech Republic, Poland, and Slovakia (which was attended by the minister of defense of Ukraine Anatoliy Hrytsenko) – it was announced that these states were ready to support Ukraine's entry into NATO. As stated, a necessary condition for this should be the support of this step by Ukrainian society and the achievement of internal stability in Ukraine.

On 27 April 2006 at a meeting of NATO foreign ministers, the representative of the NATO secretary general, James Appathurai, stated that all members of the alliance support the speedy integration of Ukraine into NATO. Russia, for its part, expressed concern about this development. As the official representative of the Russian Foreign Ministry Mikhail Kamynin stated, "de facto, we will talk about a serious military-political shift affecting the interests of Russia, which will require significant funds for the corresponding reorientation of military potentials, the reorganization of the system of military-industrial relations. Arrangements in the field of arms control may be affected.”

After the Party of Regions received the largest number of votes in the 2006 Ukrainian parliamentary election and the new government, headed by Viktor Yushchenko's political rival Viktor Yanukovych, was formed, there was a turn in Ukraine's foreign policy. By the end of 2006, not a single representative of the pro-presidential Our Ukraine bloc remained in the government. Viktor Yanukovych's foreign policy statements contradicted Yushchenko's course. Yanukovych's premiership ended following 2007 parliamentary election, when Yulia Tymoshenko Bloc and Our Ukraine-People's Self-Defense Bloc formed a coalition government, with Yulia Tymoshenko as Prime Minister.

==== Request for a NATO Membership Action Plan ====
At the beginning of 2008, the Ukrainian President, Prime Minister, and head of parliament sent an official letter (the so-called "letter of three") to apply for a Membership Action Plan (MAP). At the beginning of 2008 the work of parliament was blocked for two months due, according to at least one observer, to this letter.

Ukrainian membership in NATO gained support from a number of NATO leaders. However, it was opposed by opposition parties within Ukraine, who called for a national referendum on any steps towards further involvement with NATO. A petition with over 2 million signatures called for a referendum on Ukraine's membership proposal to join NATO. In February 2008, 57.8% of Ukrainians supported the idea of a national referendum on joining NATO, against 38.6% in February 2007. Ukrainian politicians such as Yuriy Yekhanurov and Yulia Tymoshenko stated that Ukraine would not join NATO as long as the public continued opposing the move. Later that year, the Ukrainian government started an information campaign, aimed at informing the Ukrainian people about the benefits of membership.

In January 2008, US senator Richard Lugar said: "Ukrainian President Viktor Yushchenko, Prime Minister Yulia Tymoshenko and Parliamentary chairman Arsenii Yatsenyuk have signed the statement calling for consideration on Ukraine's entry into the NATO via the MAP programme at the Bucharest summit." The Ukrainian parliament, headed by Yatsenyuk, was unable to hold its regular parliamentary session following the decision of the parliamentary opposition to prevent parliament from functioning, as a protest against joining NATO. The parliament was blocked from 25 January 2008 until 4 March 2008 (on 29 February 2008 faction leaders agreed on a protocol of mutual understanding).

US president George W. Bush and both nominees for President of the United States in the 2008 election, U.S. senator Barack Obama and U.S. senator John McCain, backed Ukraine's membership in NATO. Russian reactions were negative. In April 2008, Russian president Vladimir Putin spoke out against Ukraine's potential membership in NATO.

==== Bucharest summit ====
At the NATO summit in Bucharest in April 2008, NATO decided it would not yet offer membership to Georgia and Ukraine; nevertheless, NATO secretary-general Jaap de Hoop Scheffer said that those two countries would eventually become members. Though a powerful statement, each existing member must approve an applicant country before NATO membership can be attained; in addition, conditions can be set on applicant countries before joining the organization. Resistance reportedly came from France and Germany. Russia invaded Georgia less than four months later in August 2008.

In November 2008, German chancellor Angela Merkel, Ukrainian prime minister Yulia Tymoshenko, and Ukrainian minister of defence Anatoliy Hrytsenko doubted Ukraine would be granted a NATO MAP at NATO's December meeting. In a Times of London interview in late November, Yushchenko stated: "Ukraine has done everything it had to do. We are devoted to this pace. Everything else is an issue of political will of those allies who represent NATO." Although NATO deputy assistant secretary-general Aurelia Bouchez (Note: During a NATO conference in Hungarian Parliament on 20 November, she said "We should not make a choice between NATO enlargement and Russia as we need both.") and Secretary-General Scheffer (Note: He told a conference in Spain: "The emergence of independent states within the former Soviet space is a reality. The ability of these states to determine their own future is a litmus test for the new Europe. Do we have to choose between good relations with Russia and further enlargement? My answer is no – we will not choose, will not sacrifice one for the other. It would bring new dividing lines.") still supported Ukraine's NATO bid at the time, the Bush administration seemed not to push for Georgian and Ukrainian MAPs in late November 2008. Condoleezza Rice told a press conference, "We believe that the NATO-Georgia Commission and the NATO–Ukraine Commission can be the bodies with which we intensify our dialogue and our activities. And, therefore, there does not need at this point in time to be any discussion of MAP." President of Russia Dmitry Medvedev responded that "reason has prevailed". On 3 December 2008, NATO decided on an Annual National Programme of providing assistance to Ukraine to implement reforms required to accede to the alliance without referring to a MAP.

At the NATO–Ukraine consultations at the level of defense ministers held at the NATO headquarters in Brussels in November 2009, NATO secretary-general Anders Fogh Rasmussen praised Ukraine's first Annual National Program, which outlined the steps it intended to take to accelerate internal reform and alignment with Euro-Atlantic standards, as an important step on Ukraine's path to becoming a member of the Alliance.

=== Presidency of Viktor Yanukovych (2010–2014) ===
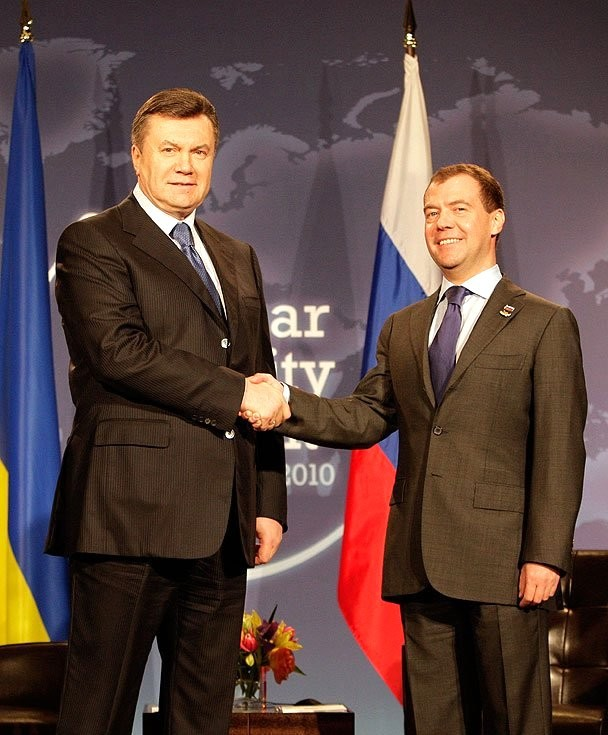
Viktor Yanukovych (left) with Russian president Dmitry Medvedev in the United States April 2010

During the 2010 presidential election campaign, Party of Regions leader and candidate Viktor Yanukovych stated that the current level of Ukraine's cooperation with NATO was sufficient and that the question of the country's accession to the alliance was therefore not urgent. Yanukovych's victory in the election marked a turnaround in Ukraine's relations with NATO. On 14 February 2010, Yanukovych said that Ukraine's relations with NATO were currently "well-defined", and that there was "no question of Ukraine joining NATO". He said the issue of Ukrainian membership of NATO might "emerge at some point, but we will not see it in the immediate future". On 1 March 2010, during his visit to Brussels, Yanukovych said that there would be no change to Ukraine's status as a member of the alliance's outreach program. He later reiterated, during a trip to Moscow, that Ukraine would remain a "European, non-aligned state".

As of May 2010, NATO and Ukraine continued to cooperate in the framework of the Annual National Program, including joint exercises. According to Ukraine, the continuation of Ukraine–NATO cooperation would not exclude the development of a strategic partnership with Russia. On 27 May 2010, Yanukovych stated that he considered Ukraine's relations with NATO as a partnership, "And Ukraine can't live without this [partnership], because Ukraine is a large country." On 3 June 2010, the Ukrainian parliament passed a bill, proposed by the President, that excluded the goal of "integration into Euro-Atlantic security and NATO membership" from the country's national security strategy. The law precluded Ukraine's membership in any military bloc, but allowed for co-operation with alliances such as NATO. According to at least one encyclopedia, this marks "when [the Ukrainian government] officially abandoned its goal of joining NATO", although as late as May 2022, according to a member of the Shmyhal Government (Deputy Prime Minister for European and Euro-Atlantic Integration of Ukraine Olha Stefanishyna), the "letter of three" had "not been withdrawn since then." "European integration" was still part of Ukraine's national security strategy.

On 24 June 2010 the Ukrainian Cabinet of Ministers approved an action plan to implement an annual national program of cooperation with NATO that year. This included:

- Involvement of Ukrainian aviation and transport material in the transportation of cargo and personnel of the armed forces of NATO's member states and partners participating in NATO-led peacekeeping missions and operations;
- The continuation of Ukraine's participation in a peacekeeping operation in Kosovo;
- Possible reinforcing of Ukraine's peacekeeping contingents in Afghanistan and Iraq;
- Ukraine's participation in a number of international events organized by NATO;
- Training of Ukrainian troops in the structures of NATO members.

Ukraine and NATO continued to hold joint seminars and joint tactical and strategical exercises and operations during the Yanukovych Presidency.

=== Ukrainian Revolution and Russian attacks on Ukraine ===
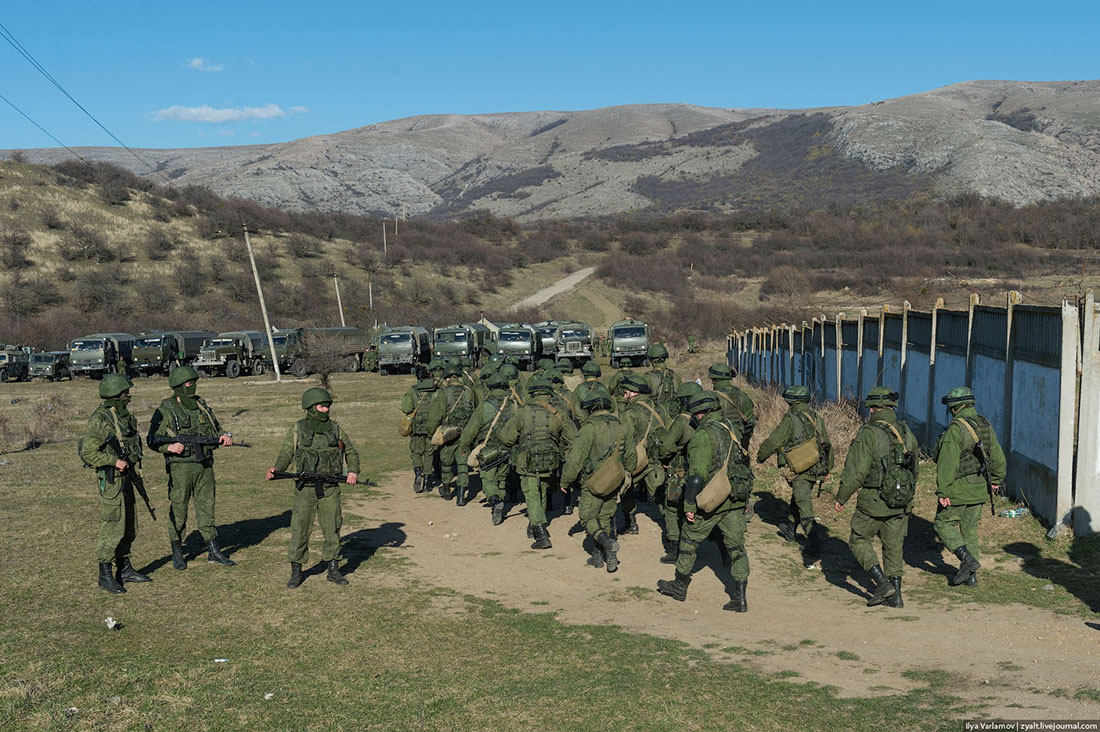
Unmarked Russian troops during the Russian annexation of Crimea, which caused NATO to suspend co-operation with Russia.

In February 2014, during Ukraine's Revolution of Dignity, president Yanukovych fled the capital despite signing an agreement with the opposition. Parliament voted to remove Yanukovych from his post and schedule new elections, while an interim government was set up. Russia denounced the events, and Russian forces began to mobilize near Ukraine's borders for "military exercises". General Philip Breedlove, NATO's Supreme Allied Commander Europe, said the alliance had not drawn up contingency plans for how to respond if Russian military took action in Ukraine: "Right now we are not planning contingencies on how to respond here. What we are doing is supporting the peaceful resolution of this".

In late February and early March 2014, Russian soldiers without insignia occupied Crimea. The soldiers seized Crimea's parliament, which then installed a pro-Russian government. A disputed referendum on Crimea's status was held under Russian occupation. According to the Russian-installed authorities, the result was overwhelmingly in favor of leaving Ukraine and joining Russia, which then annexed Crimea. NATO condemned Russia for its actions and affirmed support for Ukraine's territorial integrity and sovereignty.

Ukraine's interim Yatsenyuk government took office on 26 February. The new government said that it did not intend to make Ukraine a member of NATO. Secretary-General Rasmussen said that NATO membership was still an option for Ukraine.

Shortly after the Crimean annexation, in April 2014 towns and cities were seized in Ukraine's Donbas region by heavily-armed Russian paramilitaries. Their commander, Igor 'Strelkov' Girkin admitted that this sparked the War in Donbas, as Ukraine soon launched an operation to retake the territory.

Map of Russian-controlled territory in Ukraine, September 2014

In late August 2014, NATO released satellite imagery showing Russian forces operating inside Ukraine (see 2014 Russian invasion of the Donbas). NATO, the OSCE and other observers also reported that a large amount of weaponry, including advanced weapons, artillery and tanks, were being sent from Russia to the Russian paramilitaries in Ukraine. Russia denied the claims. At NATO's Wales summit in early September 2014, NATO Secretary General Rasmussen said

Russia is now fighting against Ukraine, in Ukraine. Russian troops and Russian tanks are attacking the Ukrainian forces. And while talking about peace, Russia has not made one single step to make peace possible".

The NATO–Ukraine Commission issued a statement condemning Russia's actions and saying "Russia must end its support for militants in eastern Ukraine, withdraw its troops and stop its military activities along and across the Ukrainian border".

Because of the invasion, Ukraine's government said it would ask parliament to end the country's non-aligned status and put it on a path towards NATO membership. The government also signaled that it hoped for major non-NATO ally (MNNA) status with the United States, NATO's largest military power and contributor. That year, a bill was introduced to the US Congress to grant MNNA status to Georgia, Moldova, and Ukraine.

=== Presidency of Petro Poroshenko (2014–2019) ===
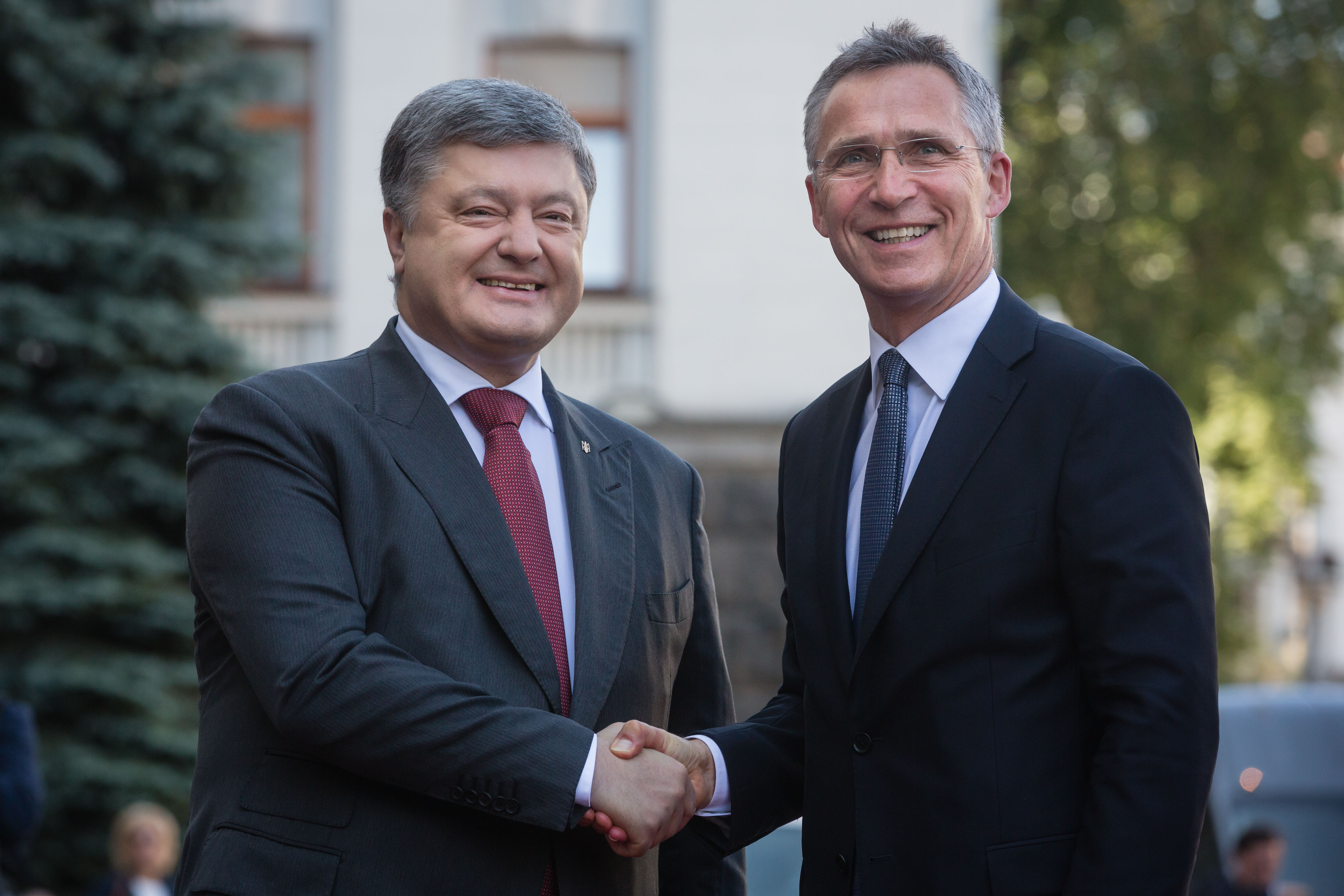
NATO secretary general Jens Stoltenberg and Petro Poroshenko, 10 July 2017

Petro Poroshenko was elected president on 25 May 2014. On 1 October 2014, Jens Stoltenberg took over the position of NATO secretary-general.

Following parliamentary elections in October 2014, the new government made joining NATO a priority, due to Russia's attacks on the country.

On 23 December 2014, the Ukrainian parliament voted to end Ukraine's non-aligned status, a step harshly condemned by Russia. The new law stated that Ukraine's previous non-aligned status "proved to be ineffective in guaranteeing Ukraine's security and protecting the country from external aggression and pressure" and also aimed to deepen Ukrainian cooperation with NATO "to achieve the criteria which are required for membership in the alliance." On 29 December 2014, Poroshenko vowed to hold a referendum on joining NATO.

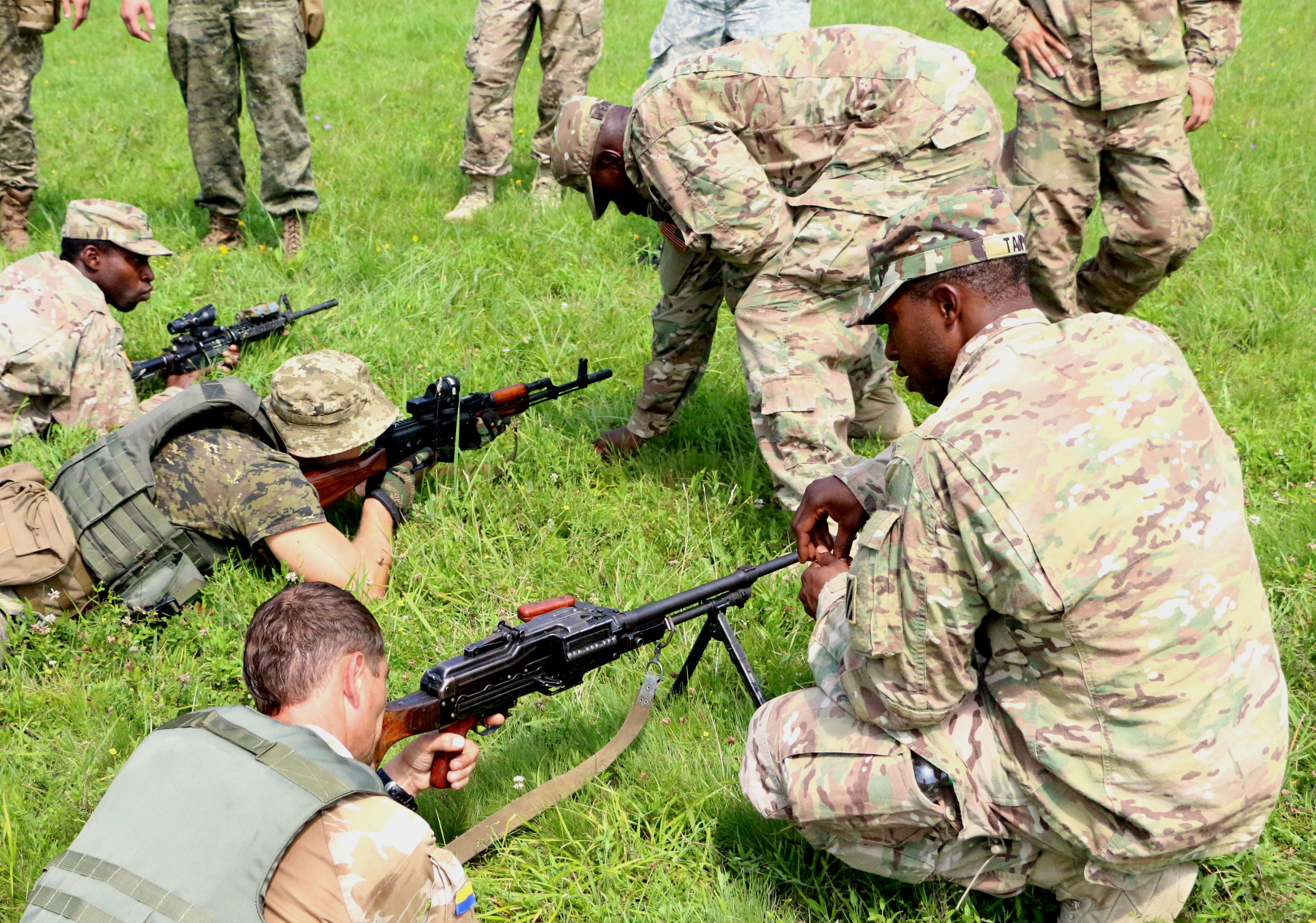
Soldiers of the U.S. Army 6th Squadron, 8th Cavalry Regiment, 2nd Infantry Brigade Combat Team, 3rd Infantry Division train Ukrainian soldiers on trigger squeeze during a 2016 drill.

A number of joint military exercises between NATO members and Ukraine were planned in 2015. Among them were Operation Fearless Guardian (OFG), which totalled 2,200 participants, including 1,000 U.S. military. Initial personnel and equipment of the 173rd Airborne Brigade arrived in Yavoriv, Lviv Oblast, on 10 April 2015. OFG would train Ukraine's newly formed Ukraine National Guard under the Congressionally-approved Global Security Contingency Fund. Under the program, the US Army was to train three battalions of Ukrainian troops over a six-month period beginning in April 2015. Other initiatives included Exercise Sea Breeze 2015 (totalling 2,500 personnel of which 1,000 US military and 500 military from NATO or "Partnership for Peace" countries), "Saber Guardian/Rapid Trident – 2015" (totalling 2,100 members, including 500 US military and 600 NATO/PfP personnel), as well as the Ukrainian-Polish air exercise "Safe Skies – 2015" (totalling 350 participants, including 100 Polish military), and military police–focused exercise "Law and Order – 2015" (totalling 100 participants, 50 of which were Polish military).

In September 2015, NATO established five trust funds totalling €5.4 million for the Ukrainian army. €2 million were targeted at the modernization of communication systems, €1.2 million to reform the logistic and standardization systems, €845,000 for physical rehabilitation and prostheses, €815,000 for cyber defense, and €410,000 for retraining and resettlement.

In March 2016, President of the European Commission Jean-Claude Juncker stated that it would take at least 20–25 years for Ukraine to join the EU and NATO.

In July 2016, NATO published a summary of the Comprehensive Assistance Package for Ukraine (CAPU) after a Heads of State meeting in Warsaw. Ukraine declared a goal for their armed forces to become interoperable with those of NATO by 2020; the CAPU was designed to meet the needs of this process. The CAPU contained more than 40 targeted support measures in key areas:

1. Capacity and Institution Building
2. Command and Control, Communications, and Computers (C4)
3. Logistics and Standardization
4. Defence Technical Cooperation
5. Cyber Defence
6. Medical Rehabilitation
7. Counter–Improvised Explosive Devices, Explosive Ordnance Disposal, and Demining
8. Security-related science
9. Strategic communications
10. Countering Hybrid Warfare
11. Security Services Reform
12. Civil Emergency Planning
13. Energy Security

On 8 June 2017, the Ukrainian parliament passed a law making integration with NATO a foreign policy priority. In July 2017, Poroshenko announced that he would seek the opening of negotiations on a MAP with NATO. In that same month, President Poroshenko began proposing a "patronage system" that tied individual Ukrainian regions to various European States.

On 10 March 2018, NATO added Ukraine to the list of aspiring members (which also included Bosnia and Herzegovina and Georgia). Several months later, in late June, Ukraine's parliament passed a National Security bill: the bill defined the principles of state policy on national security and defence as well as focusing on Ukraine's integration into the European security, economic, and legal systems; improvement in mutual relations with other states; and eventual membership in EU and NATO.

On 20 September 2018, parliament approved amendments to the constitution that would make the accession of the country to NATO and the EU a central goal and the main foreign policy objective.

On 7 February 2019, the Ukrainian parliament voted with a majority of 334 out of 385 to change the Ukrainian constitution to help Ukraine to join NATO and the European Union. After the vote, Poroshenko declared: "This is the day when the movement of Ukraine to the European Union and the North Atlantic Alliance will be consolidated in the Constitution as a foreign political landmark."

=== Presidency of Volodymyr Zelenskyy (from 2019) ===
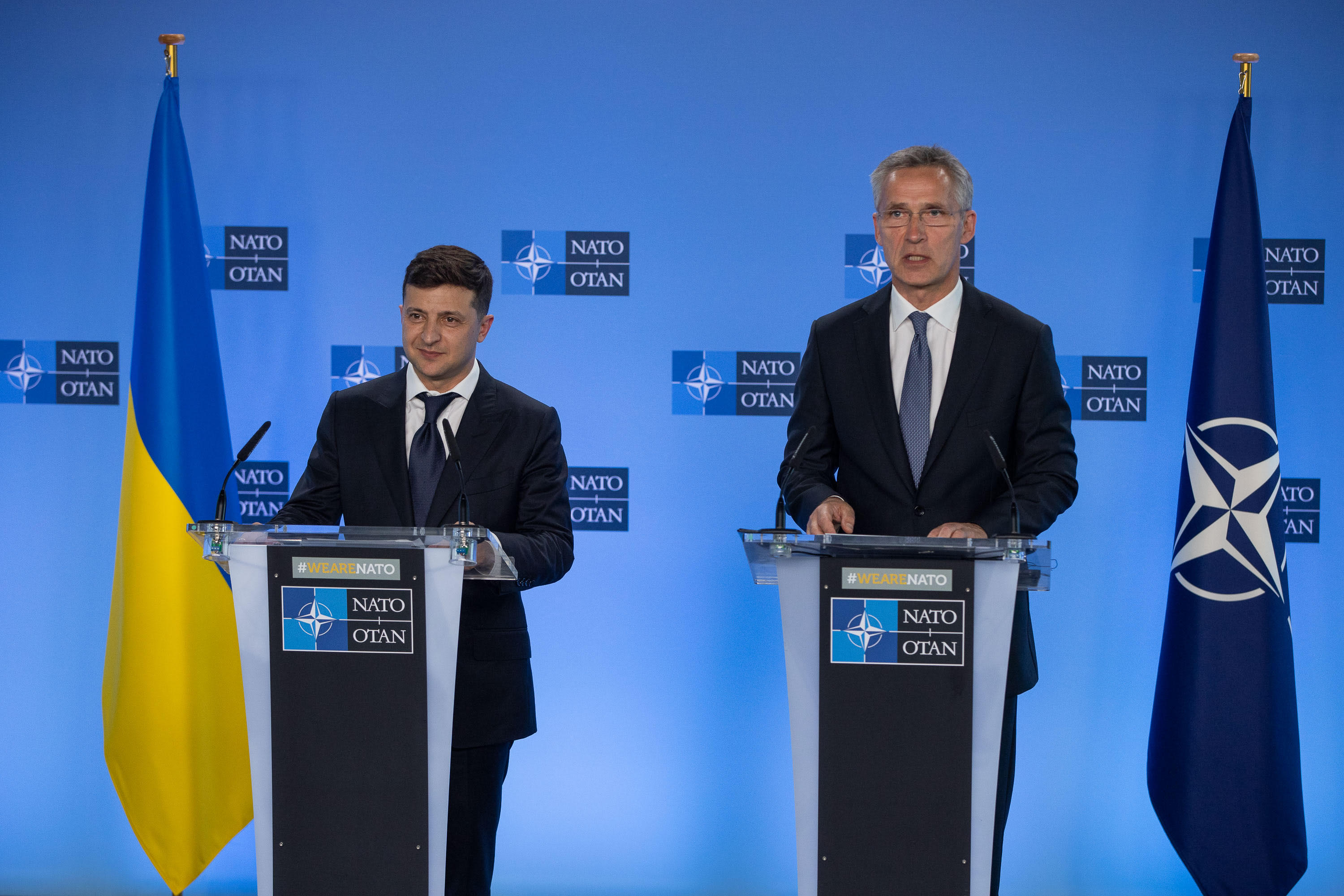
Ukrainian president Volodymyr Zelenskyy with NATO Secretary General Stoltenberg in June 2019

Ukrainian president Volodymyr Zelenskyy was inaugurated on 20 May 2019. Later that month, a bill to designate Ukraine as an MNNA was introduced into the US House of Representatives. On 12 June 2020, Ukraine joined NATO's enhanced opportunity partner interoperability program. (Note: Australia, Finland, Georgia, Jordan, and Sweden are also NATO's enhanced opportunity partner program partners.) According to an official NATO statement, the new status "does not prejudge any decisions on NATO membership."

On 14 September 2020, Zelenskyy approved Ukraine's new National Security Strategy, "which provides for the development of the distinctive partnership with NATO with the aim of membership in NATO." On 8 October 2020, during a meeting with British prime minister Boris Johnson in London, Zelenskyy stated that Ukraine needed a NATO MAP, as NATO membership would contribute to Ukraine's security and defense.

On 1 December 2020, the minister of defense of Ukraine Andriy Taran stated that Ukraine had clearly stated its ambitions to obtain the NATO MAP and hoped for comprehensive political and military support at the next Alliance Summit in 2021. Taran urged the ambassadors and military attaches of NATO member states, as well as representatives of the NATO office in Ukraine, to inform their capitals that Ukraine would hope for their full politico-military support in reaching such a decision at the next NATO Summit in 2021. This should be a practical step and a demonstration of commitment to the 2008 Bucharest Summit.

At the end of November 2020, it became known that the NATO Summit in 2021 would consider the issue of returning to an "open door policy", including the issue of providing Georgia with a MAP. On 9 February 2021, the prime minister of Ukraine, Denys Shmyhal, stated that he hoped that Ukraine would be able to receive an action plan for NATO membership at the same time as Georgia. In response, the NATO secretary-general confirmed, during Shmyhal's visit to Brussels, that Ukraine was a candidate for NATO membership.

==== First Russian military build-up ====
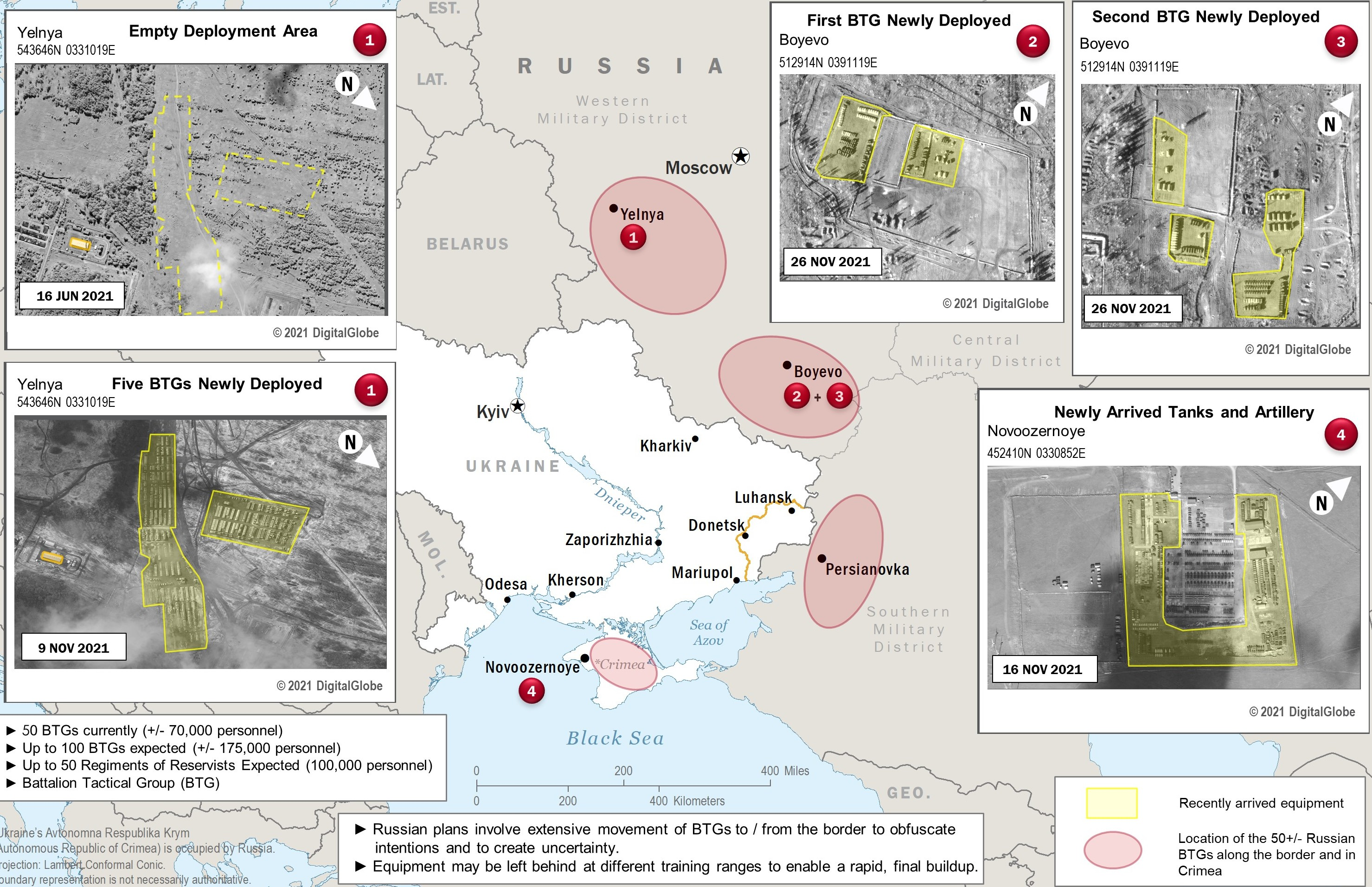
Map of Russia's military buildup around Ukraine in December 2021. It is estimated that Russia deployed 70,000 troops.

On 7 April 2021, after the start of the build-up of Russian troops near the Ukrainian border, Lithuanian Foreign Minister Gabrielius Landsbergis held a press conference with his Spanish counterpart Arancha González Laya and said that Lithuania intended to ask its NATO allies to provide Ukraine with a Membership Action Plan (MAP):

In the near future, we should again turn to our colleagues with a letter to consider the possibility of granting MAP to Ukraine. I am convinced, and we have already begun to discuss this issue with our colleagues from the Baltic states, NATO could repeat its proposal to provide Ukraine with a membership plan. This step will become a "strong signal for Russia", in particular, that Ukraine has chosen the transatlantic direction for itself, is appreciated and has support in the NATO countries.

For her part, the Spanish foreign minister, despite the fact that Ukraine was not a member of the Alliance, said that the Allies' relations with it was already "fruitful, useful and are a symbol of NATO's vision of a peaceful neighborhood." She also added that the issue of Ukraine should be discussed at the summit of the North Atlantic Alliance, which was scheduled for June that year. Following in the footsteps of his Lithuanian counterpart, Latvian Foreign Minister Edgars Rinkēvičs said on 7 April that NATO should provide Ukraine with a MAP:

We are watching closely as Russia draws troops to Ukraine's borders. It is not clear at this time what this is: a show of force or real aggression. But there is every reason to worry ... Ukraine has been trying to join NATO for 15 years by obtaining an Membership Action Plan. Apparently, it is time to provide this Plan to Ukraine. This will be at least a signal from us [NATO] that Ukrainians will not be left without support. I will definitely support this decision...

At the same April meeting, Stoltenberg said that "NATO firmly supports sovereignty and the territorial integrity of Ukraine."

On 10 April 2021, the minister of defense of Ukraine Andriy Taran stated that the top priority of the Ukrainian political leadership was to obtain a MAP in the North Atlantic Alliance in 2021. According to the head of the Ukrainian Ministry of Defense, the most convincing and effective mechanism for communicating the position of the international community to Moscow is "accelerating the implementation of the decision of the 2008 NATO Bucharest Summit on our membership in the Alliance." Receiving the MAP for Ukraine was also supported by Turkish president Recep Tayyip Erdoğan, in a joint declaration of the Ninth High-Level Strategic Council between Ukraine and the Republic of Turkey.

Following a meeting with Zelenskyy in May 2021, Democratic senator Chris Murphy said at a briefing in Kyiv that granting Ukraine a MAP would be the next logical step toward NATO membership. He stressed that Ukraine had already made several reforms necessary to become a member of NATO, and is prepared to carry out additional reforms. He also stated that if Ukraine and Georgia had received the MAP in 2008, there would have been no conflict with Russia at all:

I understand NATO's concern about the prospect of integrating with a country in conflict. But, frankly, if Ukraine and Georgia had received the MAP in 2008, I don't think there would have been a conflict at all.

On 2 June 2021, Ukrainian President Zelenskyy pointed out a potential threat that could strengthen Russia's position in Europe: the failure to give Ukraine a clear signal and specific deadlines for obtaining a MAP for NATO membership.

At the June 2021 Brussels summit, NATO leaders reiterated the decision taken at the 2008 Bucharest Summit that Ukraine would become a member of the Alliance with the NATO MAP as an integral part of the process and that Ukraine had the right to determine its own future and foreign policy course without outside interference. Secretary-General Jens Stoltenberg also stressed that Russia would not be able to veto Ukraine's accession to NATO:

Each country chooses its own path, and this also applies to joining NATO. It is up to Ukraine and the 30 NATO members to decide whether it aspires to be a member of the Alliance. Russia has no say in whether Ukraine should be a member of the Alliance. They cannot veto the decisions of their neighbors. We will not return to the era of spheres of interest, when large countries decide what to do with smaller ones.

On 28 June 2021, Ukraine and NATO forces launched joint naval drills in the Black Sea, codenamed Sea Breeze 2021. Russia had condemned the drills, with the Russian Defense Ministry saying it would closely monitor them.

==== Second Russian military build-up and demands ====
European NATO and CSTO member states on the eve of the 2022 Russian invasion of Ukraine. CSTO NATO member states in 2022 States affected by Russian occupation Russian-occupied territories

On 28 November 2021, Ukraine warned that Russia had massed nearly 92,000 troops near its borders, and speculated that Putin intended an offensive at the end of January or early February. Russia accused Ukraine of a military build-up of its own and demanded "legal guarantees" that it would never join NATO.

On 30 November 2021, Putin warned that he would not tolerate a NATO missile defense shield (to shoot down attacking missiles) ever being deployed in Ukraine. He said that Aegis Ashore interceptors, like those based in Romania and Poland, could be secretly converted to launch Tomahawk missiles that could reach Moscow within minutes. However, there were no such plans to deploy a missile shield in Ukraine. The US secretary of state, Antony Blinken, replied "it's Russia that has developed ground-launched, intermediate-range missiles that can reach Germany and nearly all NATO European territory, despite Russia being a party to the INF Treaty that prohibited these missiles". He added that "Russia's violation led to the termination of that treaty" by the first Trump administration.

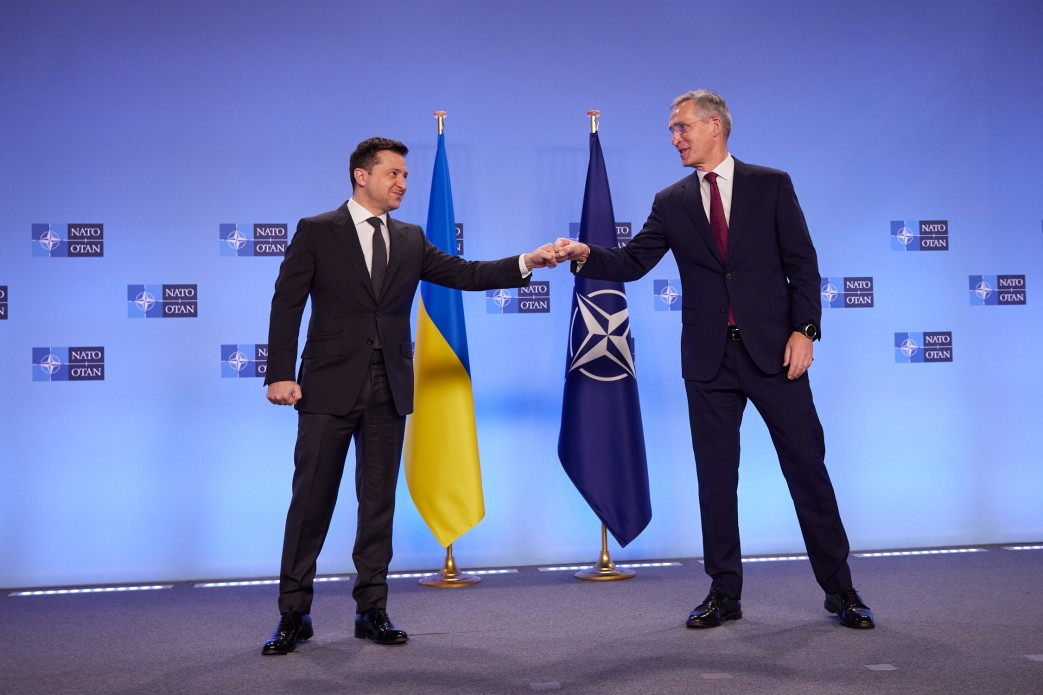
President of Ukraine Volodymyr Zelenskyy and NATO Secretary General Jens Stoltenberg. Brussels, 16 December 2021.

Putin asked U.S. president Joe Biden for legal guarantees that NATO never let Ukraine join. NATO secretary-general Jens Stoltenberg replied that "It's only Ukraine and 30 NATO allies that decide when Ukraine is ready to join NATO. Russia has no veto, Russia has no say, and Russia has no right to establish a sphere of influence to try to control their neighbors".

On 17 December 2021, the Russian government sent an ultimatum to NATO, demanding the alliance end all activity in its Eastern European member states and ban Ukraine or any former Soviet state from ever joining, among other demands. Some of the demands had already been ruled-out by NATO. A senior US official said the US was willing to discuss the proposals, but added that there were some demands "that the Russians know are unacceptable". EU High Representative Josep Borrell said these demands went against the founding principle of European security, notably the Helsinki Accords of 1975, signed by European countries and the Soviet Union.

On 11 January 2022, it became known that a group of Republican congressmen intended to introduce a bill declaring Ukraine a NATO-plus country and initiating a review of the advisability of declaring Russia a state sponsor of terrorism. The authors of the bill argued that recognizing Ukraine as a "NATO+ country" will make it possible to quickly make decisions on the provision and sale of American defense goods and services to Ukraine. In particular, according to Mike Rogers, co-author of the bill, this rule concernd the provision of anti-ship and air defense systems. In addition, this bill proposed to create a mechanism for the rapid imposition of sanctions against Nord Stream 2 in the event of a full-scale Russian invasion of Ukraine. The authors of the bill were convinced that in this way they will forever block the commissioning of the pipeline. Also, if adopted, the United States would be obliged to consider and vote on whether to grant Russia the status of a "country-sponsor of international terrorism."

On 14 January 2022, Andrii Yermak, Chairman of the Office of the President of Ukraine, praised the preparation of sanctions in the event of a Russian invasion, but warned that such an invasion "would be a great tragedy". He also said that the Ukrainian authorities hoped to hear specific conditions for joining the North Atlantic Alliance:

Ukraine has shown to its principles and positions that we are fully prepared and able to be a member of NATO. This means that at the Madrid summit this year we hope to see and hear very specific conditions and information about this, because today, especially today, I would like to repeat that now this is a matter of life and death for our country.

On 17 January 2022, Russian troops joined their Belarusian counterparts for an exercise aimed at "thwarting external aggression". The exercise began on 10 February.

NATO replied to Russia's December ultimatum on 25 January. It said "Considering the substantial, unprovoked, unjustified, and ongoing Russian military build-up in and around Ukraine and in Belarus, we call on Russia to immediately de-escalate the situation". NATO offered to improve communication and build trust with Russia, such as negotiating limits on missiles and military exercises, as long as Russia withdrew troops from Ukraine's borders. The alliance rejected Russia's demand to keep Ukraine out of NATO forever, saying this would go against its "open-door policy" and the right of countries to choose their own security. It pointed out that Russia had signed agreements affirming the right of Ukraine and other countries to join alliances. The United States proposed an agreement whereby Russia and the US would not station missiles or troops in Ukraine. To address Russia's concerns about the NATO missile defense system, the US offered to let Russia inspect the bases to confirm they are not a threat. On 28 January, Putin said the West has ignored "Russia's fundamental concerns" on NATO's enlargement and said that NATO had "strike weapons systems near Russia's borders".

On 31 January 2022, after a tense meeting of the UN Security Council, The Washington Post reported that "Russia has demanded a Western commitment to exclude Ukraine from its security umbrella and the removal of NATO forces and equipment from Eastern Europe and the Baltic States" and, according to Ambassador Linda Thomas-Greenfield, "has threatened to take military action should its demands not be met." Russian ambassador Vasily Nebenzya denied any plans for invasion and said Russia was within its rights to station troops anywhere within its own territory. He stated, "Not a single Russian politician, not a single public figure, not a single person said that we are planning to attack Ukraine." On the same day Russian Foreign Minister Sergei Lavrov said, "The main question is our clear message that we consider further NATO expansion to the East and weapons deployment, which can threaten the Russian Federation, unacceptable." Stoltenberg said "Russia has used military exercises before as a disguise, as a cover... military buildup, exercises, threatening rhetoric and a track record... all of that together, of course, make this a serious threat."

On 16 February 2022, NATO secretary-general Stoltenberg instructed commanders to work out the details of a battlegroup deployment to the alliance's southeastern flank because there were no signs of a Russian de-escalation yet. On 19 February 2022, at the Munich Security Conference, Stoltenberg remarked that despite NATO's "strong diplomatic efforts to find a political solution ... we have seen no sign of withdrawal or de-escalation so far. On the contrary, Russia's build-up continues". Stoltenberg said

We have made written proposals to Moscow to reduce risks and increase transparency of military activities, address space and cyber threats, and engage on arms control, including on nuclear weapons and missiles ... Moscow is attempting to roll back history, and recreate its spheres of influence. It wants to limit NATO's right to collective defence. And demands that we should remove all our forces and infrastructure from the countries that joined NATO after the fall of the Berlin Wall ... Moscow also wants to deny sovereign countries the right to choose their own path, and their own security arrangements.

==== Russian invasion of Ukraine ====
NATO replied to Russia's ultimatum in January 2022. It rejected some of Russia's demands but offered to negotiate others, as long as Russia stopped its military buildup around Ukraine. Putin replied that "Russia's fundamental concerns have been ignored". In his speech on 21 February 2022, Putin again warned that Ukraine's membership of NATO would threaten Russia and that the alliance would use Ukraine to launch a surprise attack. At the time, Ukraine had not applied for NATO membership and was a long way from potentially joining.

Putin ordered Russian troops into the Donbas as "peacekeepers". Zelenskyy accused Putin of wrecking peace talks and ruled out giving up any part of Ukraine. The Russian government repeatedly denied it would attack Ukraine and accused NATO of "whipping up panic" and "hysteria".

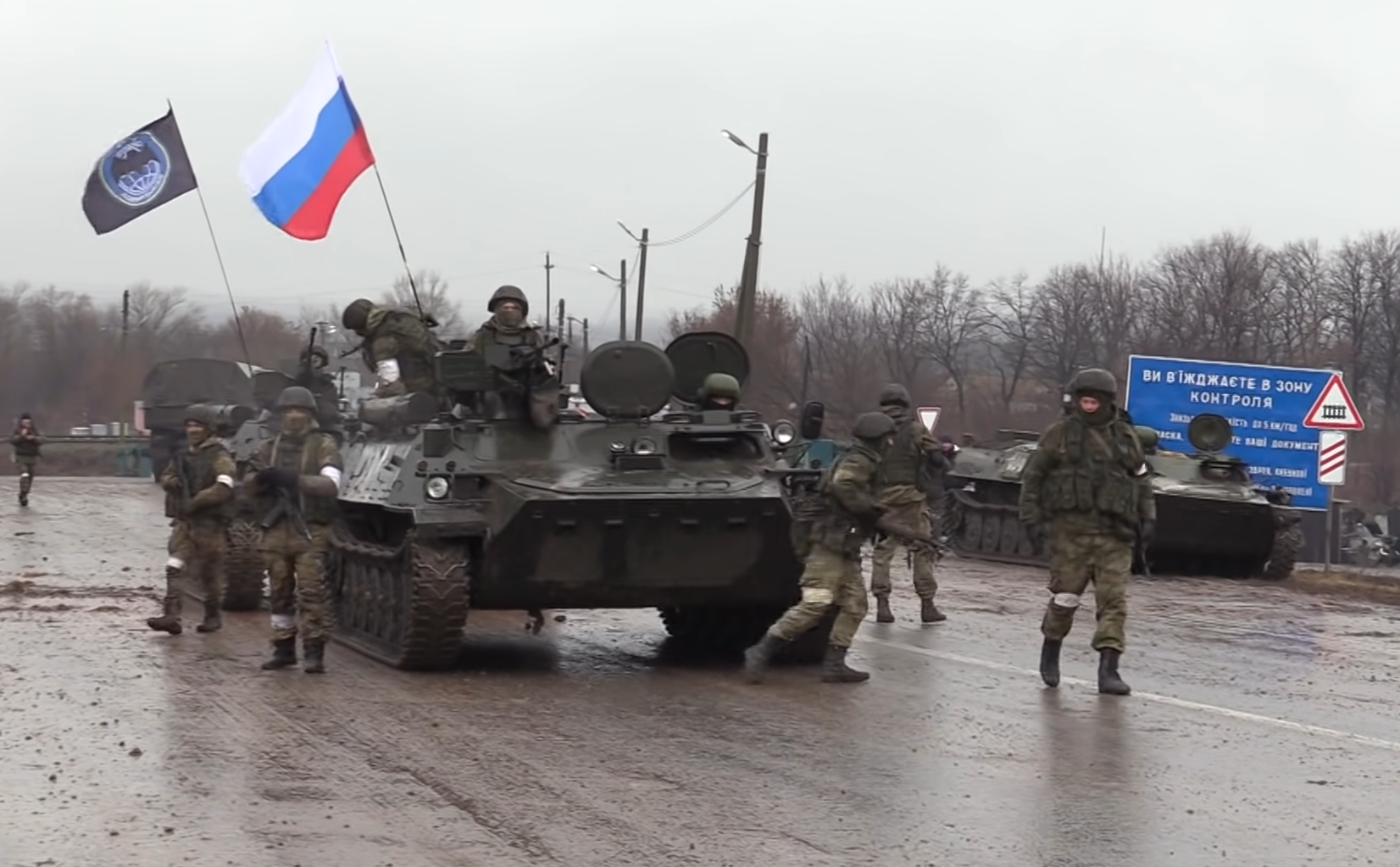
Russian troops during the invasion of Ukraine in Novoaidar, 6 March 2022

On 24 February 2022, Russia launched a full-scale invasion of Ukraine. It was the largest military attack on a European country since World War II. In his announcement, Putin falsely claimed that NATO was building up its forces and military infrastructure in Ukraine, threatening Russia, and claimed the Ukrainian military was under NATO control.

NATO issued a statement, saying:

We condemn in the strongest possible terms Russia's horrifying attack on Ukraine, which is entirely unjustified and unprovoked. ... This renewed attack is a grave violation of international law, including the UN Charter, and is wholly contradictory to Russia's commitments in the Helsinki Final Act, the Charter of Paris, the Budapest Memorandum and the NATO-Russia Founding Act. ... Throughout this crisis, NATO, the Allies, and our partners have made every effort to pursue diplomacy and dialogue with Russia and made many substantive proposals. We have repeatedly invited Russia to talks in the NATO-Russia Council. Russia has still not reciprocated. ... We will always maintain our full support for the territorial integrity and sovereignty of Ukraine ... We call on Russia to immediately cease its military action and withdraw all its forces. ... NATO will continue to take all necessary measures to ensure the security and defence of all Allies.

Reuters later reported that the deputy Kremlin Chief of Staff, Dmitry Kozak, had brokered a deal with Ukraine in February 2022 that would have kept Ukraine out of NATO, and that the deal had been rejected by Putin, because he wanted to occupy and annex Ukraine. It was also unclear if the deal had Ukrainian government support. The Russian government denied the report.

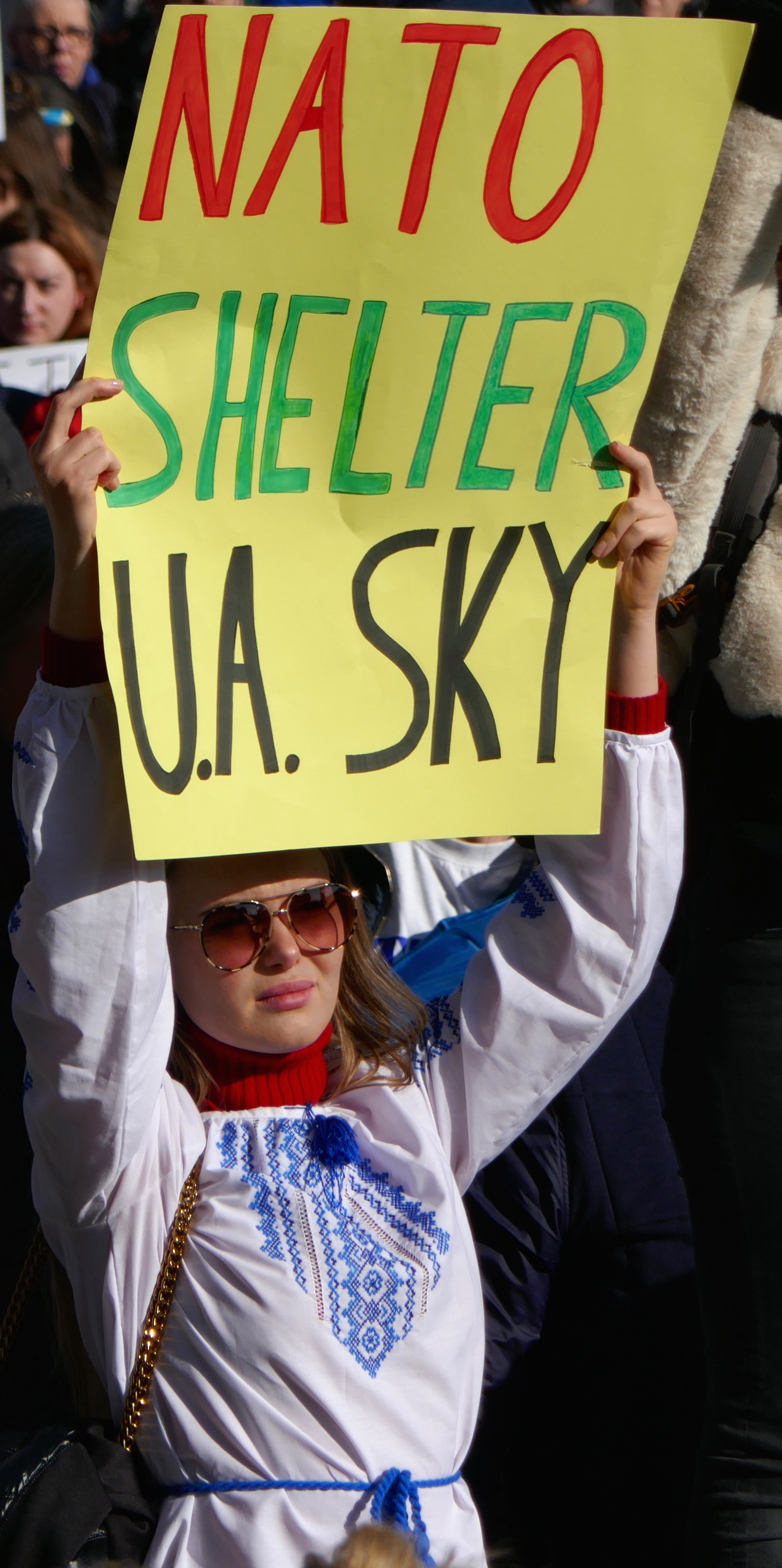
Ukrainian protester calling for NATO to enforce a no-fly zone over Ukraine, which NATO did not do

Ukraine's government urged NATO to impose a no-fly zone over Ukraine to shield it from ongoing Russian bombing. On 4 March, NATO rejected a no-fly zone, because it could draw NATO into a direct conflict with Russia. Stoltenberg said "We have a responsibility as NATO allies to prevent this war from escalating beyond Ukraine, because that would be even more dangerous, more devastating". Stoltenberg convinced the president of Poland not to send any fighter aircraft to Ukraine because of the risk of attracting Russian attacks on Poland, which would likely cause NATO to retaliate. Blinken said NATO was going to give Ukraine the means to defend itself against Russia and that Russian aggression would result in Russia's isolation and economic suffering. Borrell maintained, "It's Putin’s war, and only Putin can end it." However, Zelenskyy, unhappy at what he saw as NATO's lackluster response, replied:

"Today there was a NATO summit, a weak summit, a confused summit, a summit where it was clear that not everyone considers the battle for Europe's freedom to be the number one goal... Today, the leadership of the alliance gave the green light for further bombing of Ukrainian cities and villages, having refused to set up a no-fly zone.

On 6 March 2022, Blinken raised the possibility of a three-way exchange between Poland, Ukraine, and the US that would see Ukraine pilots fly Polish Mig-29s from a US airfield; in exchange for the Soviet-era jets Poland would receive used F-16s from the USAF. On 8 March 2022, Poland offered to donate 28 MiG-29 fighter jets to Ukraine, to be based at Ramstein airbase under US control in Germany. US Department of Defense press secretary John Kirby rejected the surprise proposal as untenable. The next day, he said the US would oppose any such plan for NATO nation, and termed the idea "high-risk", because it brought into question NATO's non-combatant status. On 9 March, the Polish prime minister said that any decision about delivering offensive weapons must be made unanimously by NATO members. Also on 9 March, Zelenskyy's plea for a no-fly zone was reiterated by Azov battalion Major Denis Prokopenko, who was tasked with the defense of Mariupol, as otherwise supplies of water, food, medicine to Mariupol would be threatened and evacuations of people would be less safe.

At a press conference on 11 March 2022, Stoltenberg said:

President Putin's war on Ukraine has shattered peace in Europe. It has shaken the international order. And it continues to take a devastating toll on the Ukrainian people. But Putin seriously underestimated Ukraine. And he seriously underestimated the strength and unity of NATO, and of our friends and partners around the world.

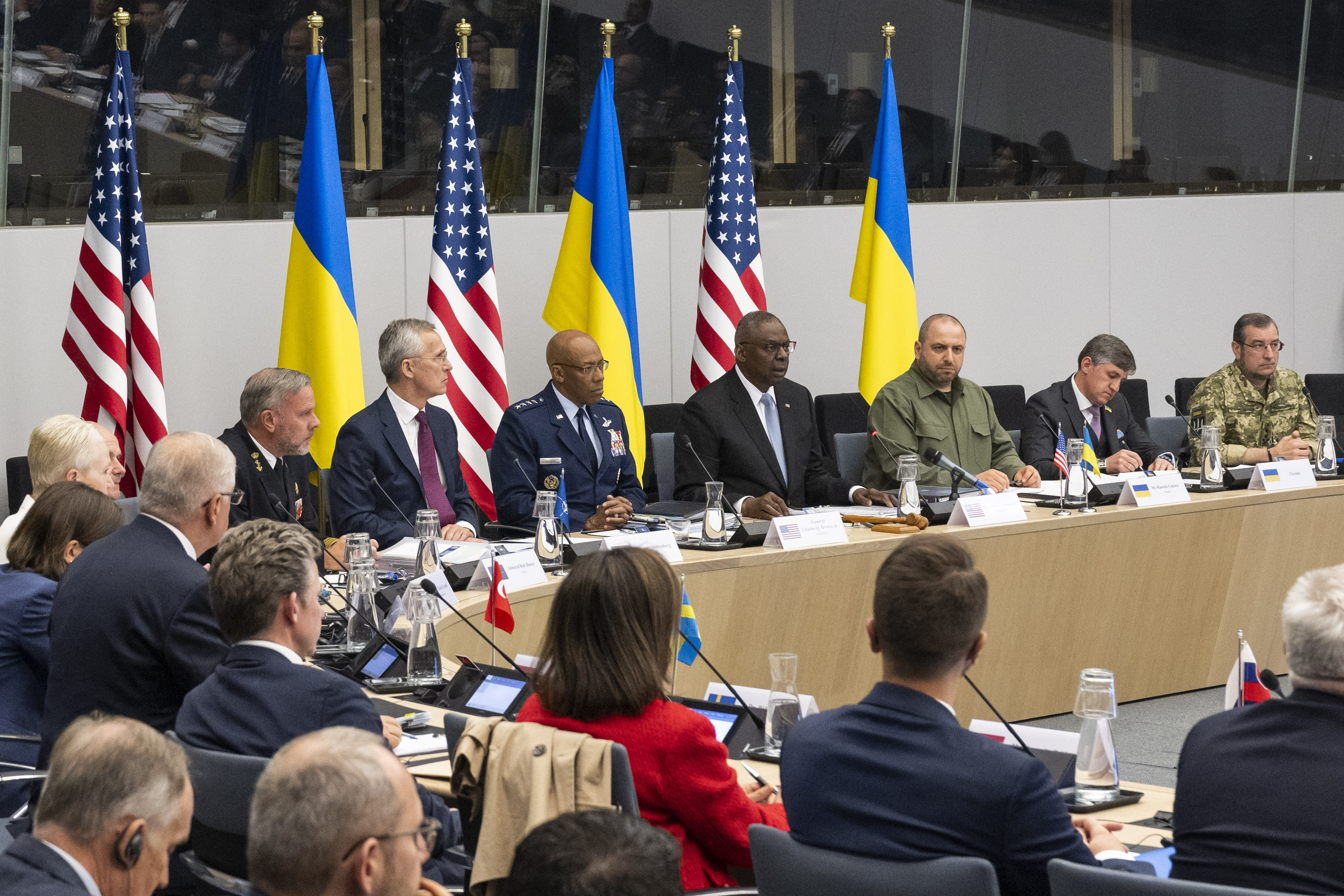
A meeting of the Ukraine Defense Contact Group

On 15 March 2022, Zelenskyy stated that he did not anticipate Ukraine joining NATO in the near future, due to a lack of consensus from member states. He said "For years we have been hearing about how the door is supposedly open (to NATO membership) but now we hear that we cannot enter. And it is true, and it must be acknowledged." On 24 March 2022, the 30 NATO heads of state held a meeting in Brussels and issued a statement, which read in part:

Massive sanctions and heavy political costs have been imposed on Russia to bring an end to this war. We remain determined to maintain coordinated international pressure on Russia... We remain committed to the foundational principles underpinning European and global security, including that each nation has the right to choose its own security arrangements free from outside interference. We reaffirm our commitment to NATO's Open Door Policy under Article 10 of the Washington Treaty... We will continue to take all necessary steps to protect and defend the security of our Allied populations and every inch of Allied territory... We are also establishing four additional multinational battlegroups in Bulgaria, Hungary, Romania, and Slovakia... President Putin's choice to attack Ukraine is a strategic mistake, with grave consequences also for Russia and the Russian people.

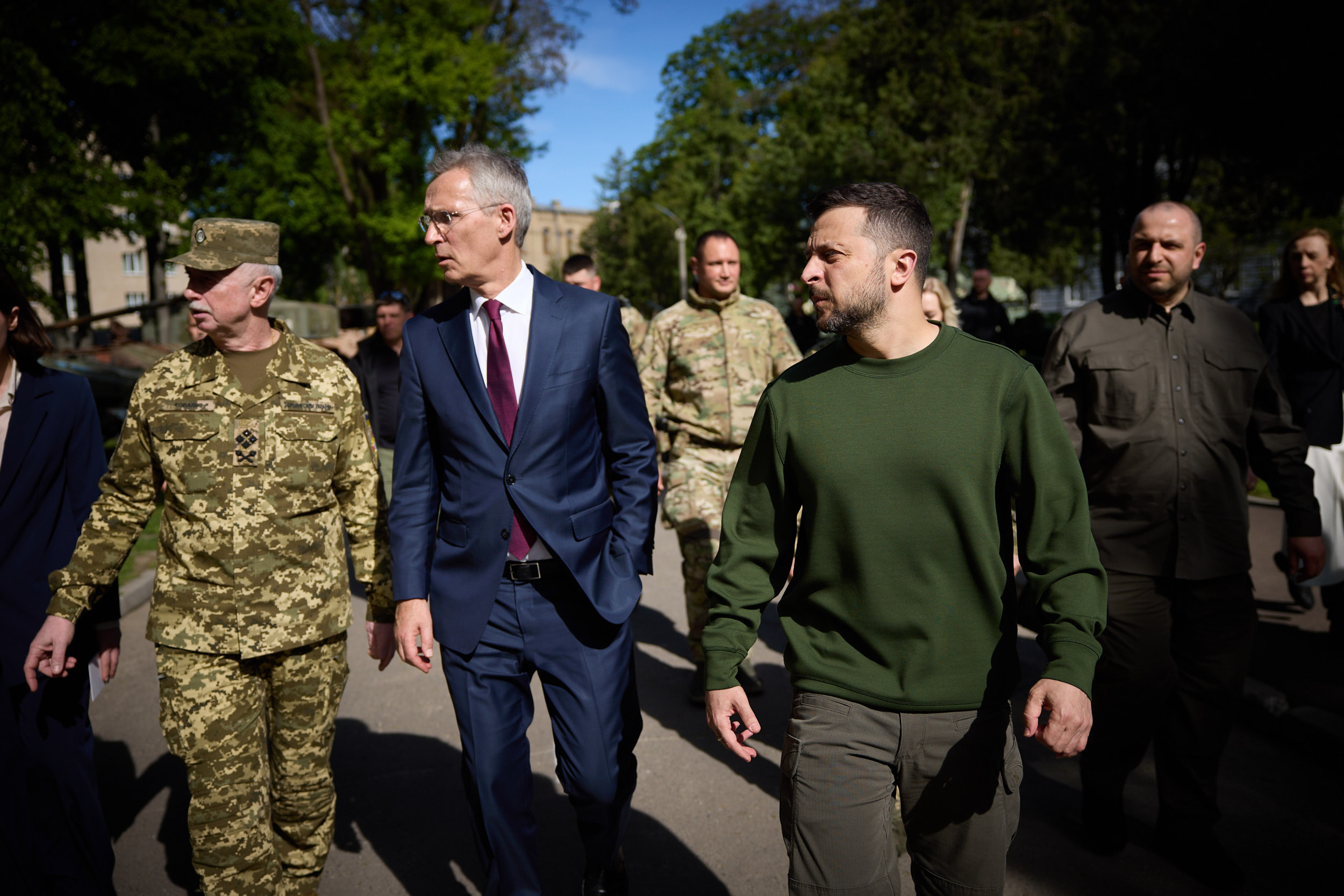
Volodymyr Zelenskyy and Jens Stoltenberg visiting Ukraine's National Defense University

On 25 March 2022, Stoltenberg was interviewed by Euronews. He spoke of the Alliance doing "as much as they can" to support Ukraine, chiefly "with advanced anti-tank weapons, air defence systems" and with "financial support, humanitarian support, but also military support." On 4 April 2022, Merkel defended her statement at the 2008 NATO summit in Bucharest that would block Ukraine from joining NATO. This has been due to Ukraine's political decisions not being met at that time. On 30 September 2022, Ukraine formally submitted an application to become a NATO member. On 2 October 2022, the presidents of nine NATO states (Note: Czech Republic, Estonia, Latvia, Lithuania, North Macedonia, Montenegro, Poland, Romania, and Slovakia) in a joint statement expressed support for Ukraine at some point joining NATO, in line with the conclusion of the 2008 Bucharest Summit, while not commenting explicitly on Ukraine's application.

On 8 July 2023, US president Joe Biden said that Ukraine was not yet ready to join NATO, emphasizing, "I don't think there is unanimity in NATO about whether or not to bring Ukraine into the NATO family now, at this moment, in the middle of a war." Ukrainian president Volodymyr Zelenskyy believed that the lack of a timeframe posed a setback for Ukraine. In July 2023, he said, "NATO will give Ukraine security. Ukraine will make the alliance stronger." On the same day, Turkish president Recep Tayyip Erdoğan announced that his country would fully support Ukraine's NATO membership. At NATO's 2023 Vilnius summit, it was decided that Ukraine would no longer be required to participate in a Membership Action Plan before joining the alliance. On 10 July 2024, Stoltenberg announced establishing the NATO Security Assistance and Training for Ukraine command, headquartered in Wiesbaden, Germany, to ensure training and delivery of security assistance to Ukraine, consisting of 700 personnel.

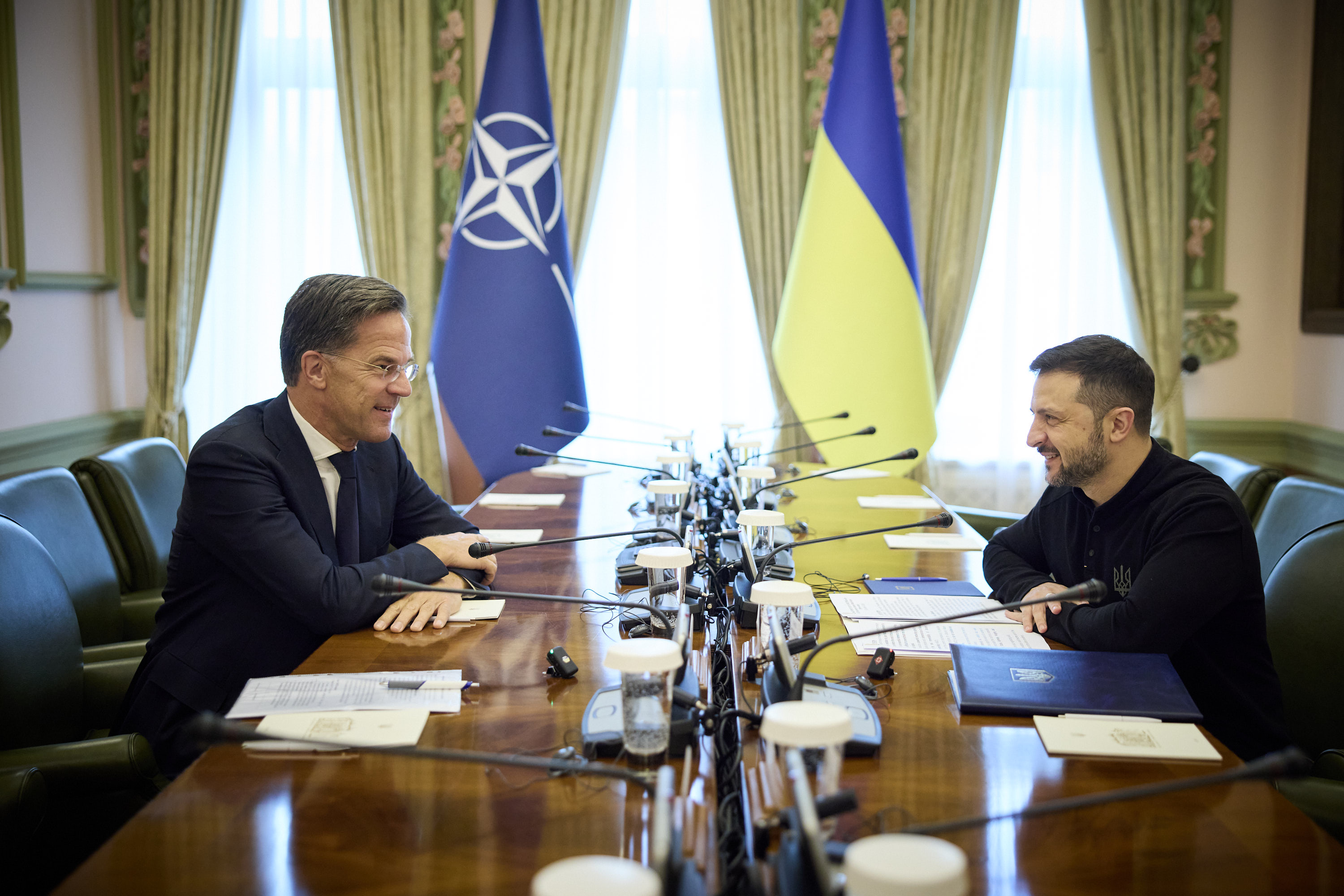
NATO secretary general Mark Rutte with Ukrainian president Volodymyr Zelenskyy in Kyiv, 3 October 2024

In March 2025, following the new Trump administration's announcement that it does not support NATO membership for Ukraine, NATO secretary general Mark Rutte stated that Ukraine had never been promised NATO membership as part of a peace agreement. and that Europe and the US should eventually normalise relations with Russia after a peace agreement.

== Public opinion in Ukraine ==
Popular support in Ukraine for NATO membership since 2000

2020–2025
Date	Opinion		Poll agency
Date	For	Against	Poll agency
September 2025	82.9%	11.1%	Razumkov Centre
February 2024	77%	5%	International Republican Institute & Rating
November 2023	77%	5%	Rating
September 2023	79%	5%	International Republican Institute
July 2023	83%	6%	Rating
May 2023	89%	3%	Kyiv International Institute of Sociology
February 2023	82%	3%	International Republican Institute & Rating
January 2023	86%	14%	National Democratic Institute
January 2023	86%	3%	Rating
October 2022	83%	4%	Rating
July 2022	71%	7%	Kyiv International Institute of Sociology
June 2022	76%	10%	Rating
June 2022	72%	7%	International Republican Institute & Rating
April 2022	59%	14%	International Republican Institute & Rating
April 2022	68%	23%	Rating
March 2022	72%	12%	Rating
January 2022	64%	17%	Ukrainian Institute of the Future
December 2021	59.2%	28.1%	Kyiv International Institute of Sociology
August 2021	54%	35%	Rating
June 2021	47.8%	24.3%	Kyiv International Institute of Sociology
February 2020	43.5%	31.3%	Kyiv International Institute of Sociology
January 2020	49.8%	29.8%	Razumkov Centre

2014–2019
Date	Opinion		Poll agency
Date	For	Against	Poll agency
June 2019	53%	29%	Rating
September 2018	45%	31%	International Republican Institute & Rating
September 2018	46.3%	31.6%	Razumkov Centre
March 2018	43%	33%	International Republican Institute & Rating
December 2017	37%	26%	International Republican Institute & Rating
September 2017	45%	27%	Kyiv International Institute of Sociology
June 2017	40%	27%	International Republican Institute & Rating
April 2017	46%	27%	International Republican Institute & Rating
December 2016	71%	23%	Democratic Initiatives Foundation & Razumkov Centre
September 2016	39%	31%	Kyiv International Institute of Sociology
June 2016	39%	32%	Rating
May 2016	44%	38%	Kyiv International Institute of Sociology
March 2016	45%	30%	Rating
January 2016	47%	31%	Rating
December 2015	75%	11%	Democratic Initiatives Foundation
July 2015	63.9%	28.5%	Democratic Initiatives Foundation & Razumkov Centre
June 2015	53%	32%	Pew Research Center
March 2015	43.3%	33.4%	Kyiv International Institute of Sociology
November 2014	51%	25%	Rating
October 2014	53%	34%	Gorshenin Institute
July 2014	44%	34%	Rating
June 2014	47%	36%	Gorshenin Institute
June 2014	41%	40%	Razumkov Centre
May 2014	41%	40%	Democratic Initiatives Foundation & Razumkov Centre
May 2014	37%	42%	Razumkov Centre
April 2014	36%	48%	Razumkov Centre
March 2014	44%	47%	GfK

2000–2013
Date	Opinion		Poll agency
Date	For	Against	Poll agency
October 2013	20%	66%	Rating
December 2012	15%	60%	Democratic Initiative Foundation
October 2012	19%	66%	Rating
July 2012	17%	70%	Rating
April 2012	15%	62%	Democratic Initiative Foundation
February 2012	20%	70%	Rating
April 2011	25%	60%	IFAK Ukraine
January 2011	24%	70%	Rating
December 2009	21%	60%	Democratic Initiative Foundation
April 2009	21%	57%	FOM-Ukraine
June 2002	32%	32.2%	Razumkov Centre
November 2000	30%	40%	Institute of Public Affairs, Poland

Western Ukraine has long been significantly more pro-NATO than the rest of the country. Eastern Ukraine has traditionally been more anti-NATO and pro-Russia than the rest of Ukraine.

According to numerous independent polls conducted between 2002 and the events of 2014, Ukrainian public opinion on NATO membership was split, with the majority of those polled being against joining the military alliance and many identifying it as a threat. A Gallup poll conducted in October 2008 showed that 43% of Ukrainians associated NATO as a threat to their country, while only 15% associated it with protection. A 2009 Gallup poll showed that 40% of Ukrainian adults associate NATO with "Threat" and 17% with "Protection." According to a poll by the Razumkov Center in March 2011, 20.6% on average across Ukraine considered NATO a threat; this number was 51% in Crimea. A 2013 Gallup poll showed that 29% associated NATO with "Threat" and 17% with "Protection"; 44% viewed it as neither.

Following the Russian military intervention of 2014, the annexation of Crimea, and the start of the Donbas War, many Ukrainians changed their views of NATO: polls from the middle of 2014 until 2016 showed that the majority of Ukrainians supported NATO membership.

An electronic petition to the president of Ukraine, Petro Poroshenko, was filed on 29 August 2015, requesting that a referendum on joining NATO be conducted. The petition received the required 25,000 signatures to be considered. The president's reply stated that, "One of the main priorities of Ukraine's foreign policy is to deepen cooperation with NATO to achieve the criteria required for membership in this organization. Today, we carry out security sector reform in Ukraine to reach NATO standards and to strengthen the country's defense system, which is necessary to counter Russian aggression. Once Ukraine fulfills all the necessary criteria to join the Alliance, the final decision on this important issue will be approved by the Ukrainian people in a referendum."

In February 2017, President Poroshenko announced that a referendum would have been held during his presidency, with polls showing that 54% of Ukrainians favored such a move.

According to a sociological survey conducted by the Ukrainian Institute for the Future, together with the sociological company New Image Marketing Group, in January 2022, 64% of Ukrainians supported Ukraine's accession to NATO, while 17% did not support it, and 13% did not have an unequivocal opinion on this issue. In the west of Ukraine, in the city of Kyiv, and in the south of Ukraine, there were the most supporters for joining NATO – 73%, 71%, and 59%. This idea is supported least of all in Eastern Ukraine – 47%.

== Russian opposition to Ukrainian NATO membership ==
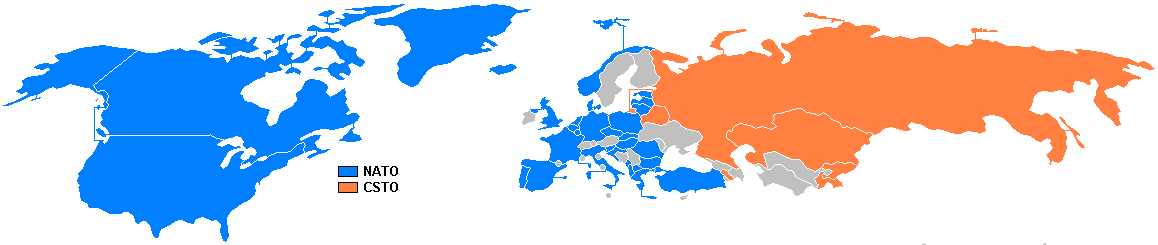
A map of NATO (blue) and the CSTO (orange) when the 2022 invasion began.

The Russian Federation has bordered NATO since 1991, when Russia became independent. In 1999, Russia signed the Charter for European Security, affirming the right of each state "to choose or change its security arrangements" and to join military alliances if they wish. In 2002, Putin did not object to Ukraine's growing relations with the NATO alliance and said it was a matter for Ukraine and NATO. In 2005, Putin said that if Ukraine wanted to join NATO, "we will respect their choice, because it is their sovereign right to decide their own defence policy, and this will not worsen relations between our countries". According to Michael McFaul and Robert Person, this suggests Putin did not truly believe it to be a threat.

It was not until his 2007 Munich speech that Putin openly opposed Ukrainian membership of NATO. At the 2008 Bucharest summit, Putin warned that it would be deemed a threat to Russia, and reportedly threatened to annex parts of Ukraine if it joined NATO. That February, he said Russia may target missiles at Ukraine if it ever joins and allows the deployment of a US missile defense shield.

Following the 2014 Ukrainian Revolution, Russia occupied and annexed Crimea, and supported a pro-Russian insurgency in eastern Ukraine. Ukraine was officially a neutral country at the time and did not seek NATO membership even after the annexation of Crimea. In his Crimea speech on 19 March 2014, Putin said that the dissolution of the Soviet Union had "robbed" Russia of territory and called this an "outrageous historical injustice". He said "we are against having a military alliance making itself at home right in our backyard or in our historic territory. I simply cannot imagine that we would travel to Sevastopol to visit NATO sailors". Later that year, Putin's spokesman Dmitry Peskov called for NATO to bar Ukraine from ever joining. Stoltenberg said "Each country has the right to decide what kind of security arrangements it wants". Ukraine's parliament voted to end the country's neutral status in December 2014, in response to Russian military aggression, including the 2014 Russian invasion of the Donbas.

From October 2021, there was a massive Russian military buildup on Ukraine's borders. On 30 November, Putin warned that he would not tolerate a NATO missile defense shield (to shoot down attacking missiles) ever being deployed in Ukraine. He said that Aegis Ashore interceptors, like those based in Romania and Poland, could be secretly converted to launch Tomahawk missiles that could reach Moscow within minutes. However, there were no such plans to deploy a missile shield in Ukraine. Blinken replied, "it's Russia that has developed ground-launched, intermediate-range missiles that can reach Germany and nearly all NATO European territory, despite Russia being a party to the INF Treaty that prohibited these missiles". He added that "Russia's violation led to the termination of that treaty" by the first Trump administration.

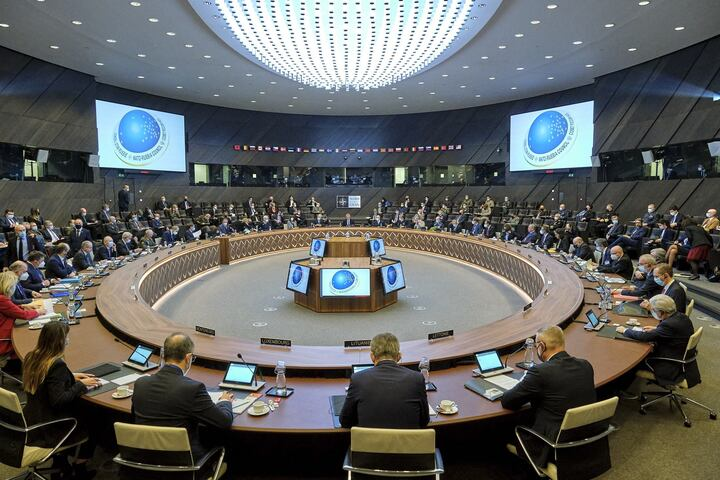
The NATO-Russia Council meets in January 2022 to discuss the crisis

In December 2021, Russia sent an ultimatum to NATO, demanding the alliance end all activity in its Eastern European member states and ban Ukraine or any former Soviet state from ever joining, among other demands. Some of the demands had already been ruled out by NATO. A senior US official said the US was willing to discuss the proposals, but added that there were some "that the Russians know are unacceptable". Several Western political analysts suggested Russia was making unrealistic demands as a "smokescreen", knowing their demands would be rejected and thus giving Russia a pretext to invade. Others suggested that Putin was "aiming high to squeeze concessions" out of NATO. No countries bordering Russia had joined NATO since 2004. Stoltenberg asserted that "Russia has no veto" on Ukraine's relations with NATO and that "Russia has no right to establish a sphere of influence to try to control their neighbors". Lavrov warned, "If there is no constructive response within a reasonable time and the West continues its aggressive line, then Russia will be forced to ... eliminate unacceptable threats to our security".

NATO replied to Russia's demands on 25 January. It said "considering the substantial, unprovoked, unjustified, and ongoing Russian military build-up in and around Ukraine ... we call on Russia to immediately de-escalate the situation". NATO offered to negotiate some of Russia's demands and to improve military transparency, as long as Russia stopped its troop buildup. The alliance rejected Russia's demand to keep Ukraine out of NATO forever, pointing out that Russia had signed agreements affirming the right of Ukraine and all countries to join alliances. The United States proposed an agreement whereby Russia and the US would not station missiles or troops in Ukraine. To address Russia's concerns about the NATO missile defense system, the US offered to let Russia inspect the bases to confirm they are not a threat.

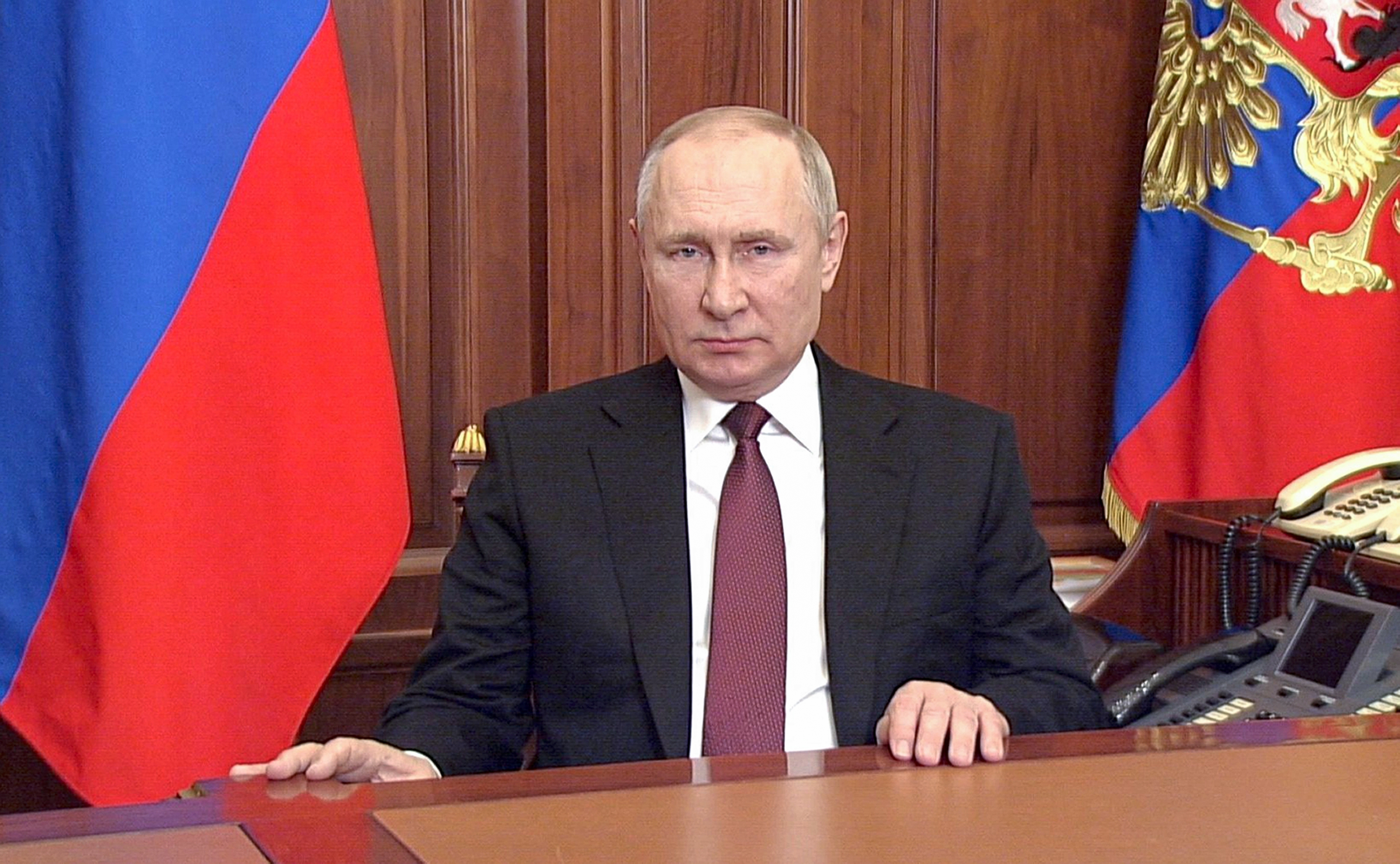
Putin announcing the invasion of Ukraine

In his speech on 21 February 2022, Putin again warned that Ukraine's membership of NATO would threaten Russia and that the alliance would use Ukraine to launch a surprise attack. Ukraine had not applied for NATO membership and was a long way from potentially joining. On 24 February 2022, Russia launched a full-scale invasion of Ukraine. In his announcement of the invasion, Putin falsely claimed that NATO was building up its forces and military infrastructure in Ukraine, threatening Russia, and claimed the Ukrainian military was under NATO control.

An article published by the Institute for the Study of War concluded:

"Putin didn't invade Ukraine in 2022 because he feared NATO. He invaded because he believed that NATO was weak, that his efforts to regain control of Ukraine by other means had failed, and that installing a pro-Russian government in Kyiv would be safe and easy. His aim was not to defend Russia against some non-existent threat but rather to expand Russia's power, eradicate Ukraine's statehood, and destroy NATO".

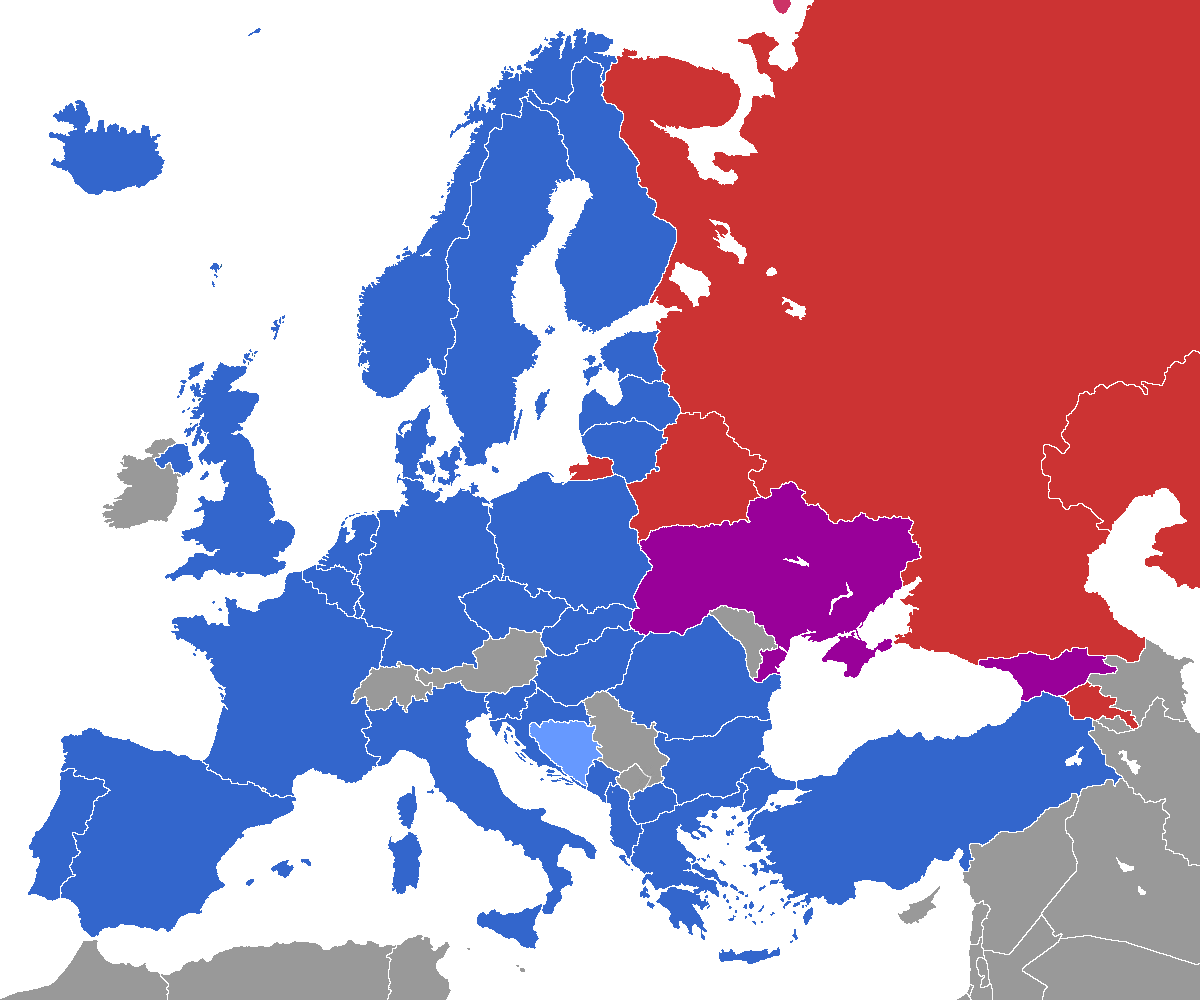
Blue: European NATO members in 2024, after Finland and Sweden joined. Purple: Aspiring members Ukraine and Georgia. Red: Russian-led CSTO.

Peter Dickinson of the Atlantic Council suggested the real reason Putin opposed Ukraine's NATO membership was not because he believed it was a military threat, but because it would prevent him from controlling Ukraine. McFaul and Robert Person argued that Putin cannot tolerate a fellow Slavic neighbor being a successful democracy, because it could spur democratic change in Russia and undermine his autocratic rule. They write that Ukraine's relationship with NATO "was just a symptom of what Putin believes is the underlying disease: a sovereign, democratic Ukraine". Steven Pifer argued that Russia's own aggressive actions since 2014 have done the most to push Ukraine towards the West and NATO.

On 30 September 2022, Russia proclaimed the annexation of four Ukrainian provinces. In response, Ukraine officially applied to join NATO.

Medvedev, Putin's deputy on the Security Council of Russia, said in 2024 that, "We must do everything so that Ukraine's 'irreversible path' to NATO ends" with the "disappearance" of both Ukraine and NATO. On 2 September 2025, Russian President Vladimir Putin announced that Russia did not oppose Ukraine's membership in the EU, but opposed its membership in NATO.

== Timeline of relations ==
Event	Date	Ref.
Partnership for Peace	8 February 1994	
Application submitted	30 September 2022	

Ukrainian actions toward NATO membership
Signatory	Date	Institution	In favour	Against	AB	Deposited	Ref.
Ukraine	30 September 2022	Government (submit application)	Granted				

== Ukraine's relations with NATO member states ==
- Albania
- Belgium
- Bulgaria
- Canada
- Croatia
- Czech Republic
- Denmark
- Estonia
- Finland
- France
- Germany
- Greece
- Hungary
- Iceland
- Italy
- Latvia
- Lithuania
- Luxembourg
- Montenegro
- Netherlands
- North Macedonia
- Norway
- Poland
- Portugal
- Romania
- Slovakia
- Slovenia
- Spain
- Sweden
- Turkey
- United Kingdom
- United States

== See also ==
- NATO–Ukraine Council
- Ukraine Defense Contact Group
- Foreign relations of Ukraine
- Foreign relations of NATO
- Enlargement of NATO
- NATO open door policy
- Partnership for Peace
- 2006 anti-NATO protests in Feodosia
- Ukraine–NATO Civic League
- Ukraine–Commonwealth of Independent States relations
- Ukraine–European Union relations
- Ukraine–United States relations
- Accession of Ukraine to the European Union
- Munich Agreement
- Georgia–NATO relations
- Russia–NATO relations
- Belarus–NATO relations
- Moldova–NATO relations
- NATO–Russia relations
- Sweden–NATO relations
- Serbia–NATO relations
- Russia–Ukraine relations
- Russia–United States relations
- Russian invasion of Ukraine
- JATEC, joint NATO–Ukraine civil-military organization located in Bydgoszcz, Poland
