= Armorial of NATO =

This is an incomplete list of NATO coats of arms and emblems. Today, most NATO entities have their own heraldic or heraldically inspired symbols.

== Political-military governance at NATO Headquarters ==
=== Headquarters and support ===
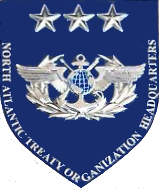
NATO Headquarters

NATO Close Protection Unit

=== Military governance, staff and standardization ===
NATO Military Committee

International Military Staff

NATO Situation Centre

NATO Electromagnetic Warfare Advisory Committee

NATO Electromagnetic Warfare Working Group

NATO Standardization Office

== NATO Command Structure ==
=== Allied Command Operations ===
==== Strategic headquarters and joint force commands ====
Supreme Headquarters Allied Powers Europe

Allied Joint Force Command Brunssum

Allied Joint Force Command Naples

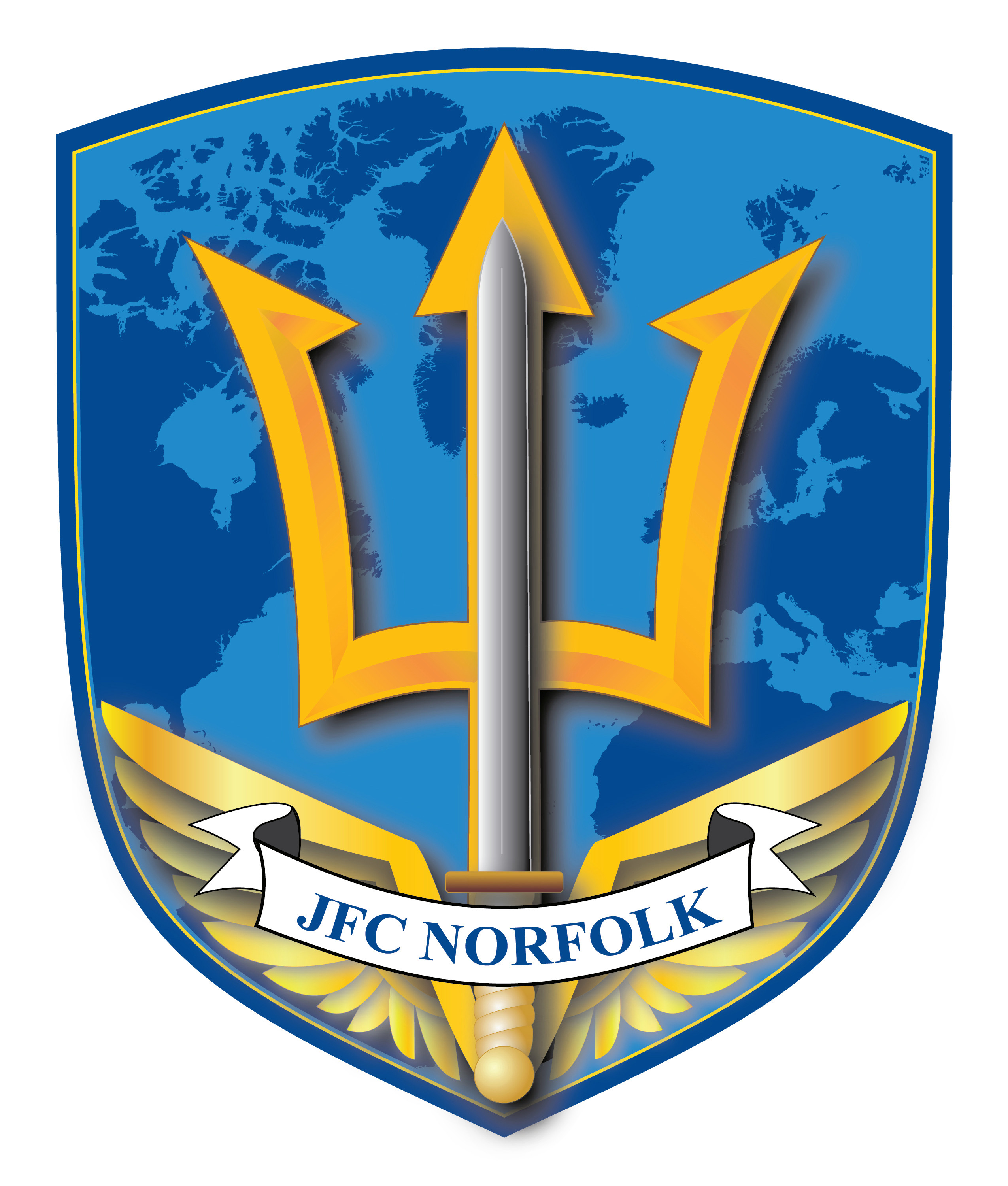
Joint Force Command Norfolk

Joint Support and Enabling Command

==== Air and space components ====
Allied Air Command

NATO Space Operations Centre

Combined Air Operations Centre Bodø

Combined Air Operations Centre Uedem

Combined Air Operations Centre Torrejón

Deployable Air Command and Control Centre

==== Land and maritime components ====
Allied Land Command

Allied Maritime Command

NATO Maritime Centre for the Security of Critical Undersea Infrastructure

==== Specialized staffs and commands responsible to SACEUR ====
NATO Intelligence Fusion Centre

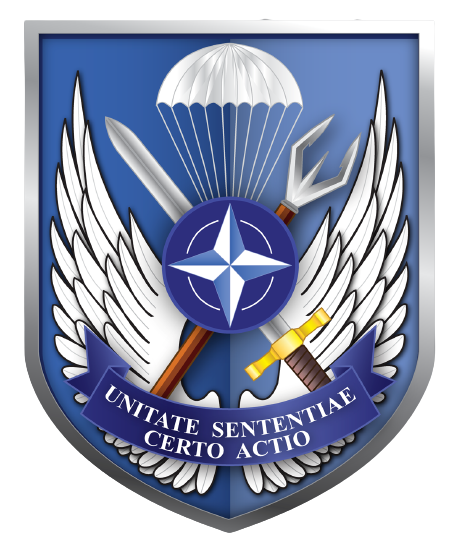
Allied Special Operations Forces Command

NATO Special Operations University

NATO Communications and Information Systems Group

NATO Airborne Early Warning and Control Force

NATO Mission Systems Engineering Centre

NATO Security Assistance and Training for Ukraine

Naval Striking and Support Forces NATO

==== NATO high-readiness forces ====
Allied Reaction Force

=== Allied Command Transformation ===
Allied Command Transformation

Joint Warfare Centre

Joint Force Training Centre

Joint Analysis and Lessons Learned Centre

Joint Analysis, Training and Education Centre

== Education and training ==
NATO Defense College

NATO School Oberammergau

Partnership Training and Education Centres

== NATO agencies and other bodies ==
=== Agencies, executive bodies and innovation organisations ===
NATO Communications and Information Agency

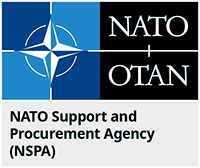
NATO Support and Procurement Agency

NATO Science and Technology Organization

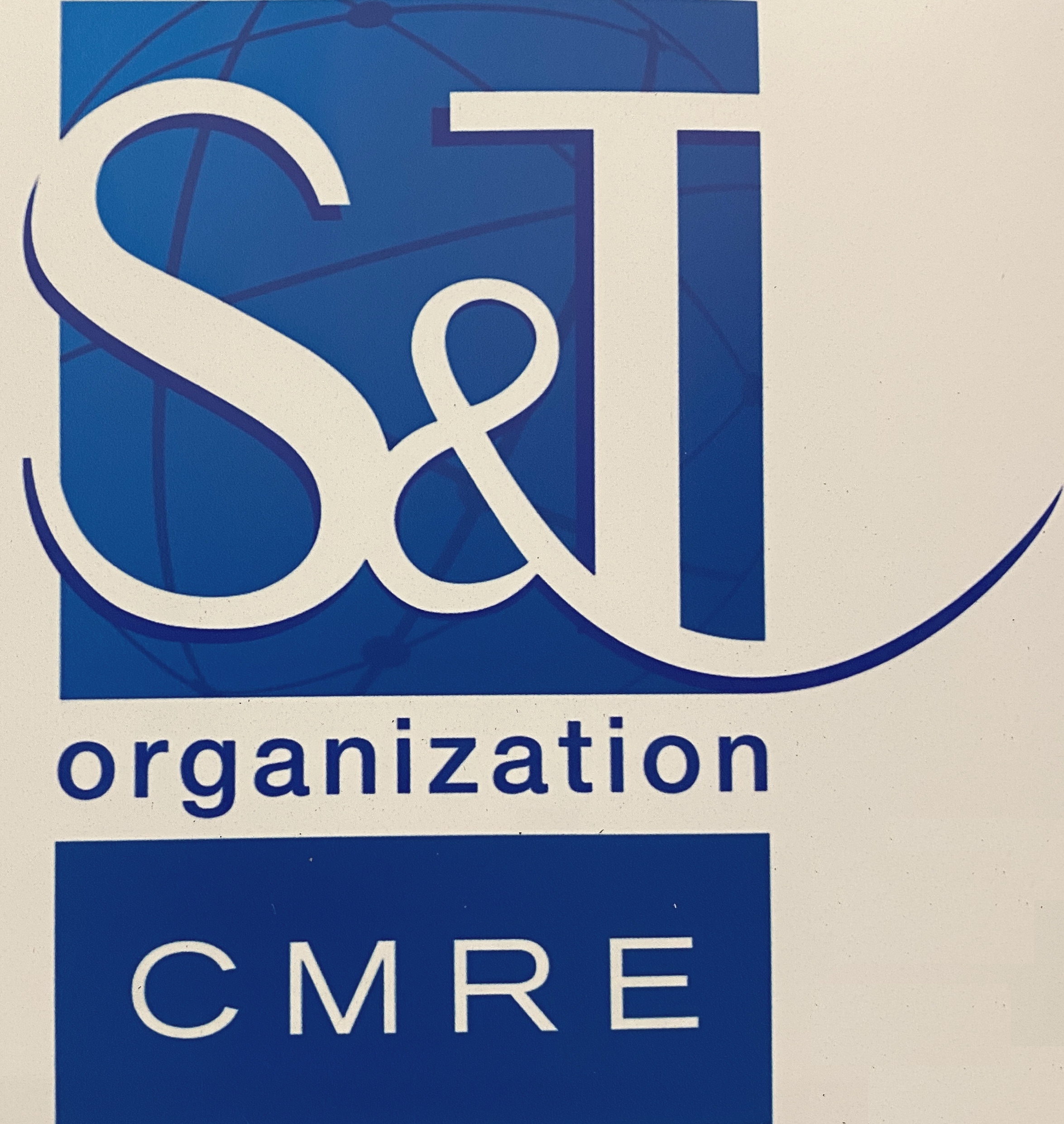
Centre for Maritime Research and Experimentation

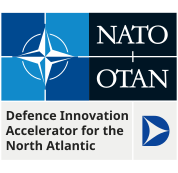
Defence Innovation Accelerator for the North Atlantic

=== Armaments and capability-development bodies ===
NATO Industrial Advisory Group

NATO Naval Armaments Group

NATO Naval Forces Sensor and Weapons Accuracy Check Sites

=== Multinational capability initiatives ===
Multinational Multi-Role Tanker Transport Fleet

NATO Flight Training Europe

== NATO-accredited Centres of Excellence ==
NATO Centre of Excellence – Cold Weather Operations

Joint Air Power Competence Centre

NATO Military Police Centre of Excellence

NATO Joint Chemical, Biological, Radiological and Nuclear Defence Centre of Excellence

NATO Maritime Security Centre of Excellence

NATO Strategic Communications Centre of Excellence

NATO Centre of Excellence for Operations in Confined and Shallow Waters

NATO Command and Control Centre of Excellence

NATO Energy Security Centre of Excellence

NATO Centre of Excellence – Defence Against Terrorism

NATO Climate Change and Security Centre of Excellence

NATO Mountain Warfare Centre of Excellence

NATO Crisis Management and Disaster Response Centre of Excellence

NATO Maritime Geospatial, Meteorological, and Oceanographic Centre of Excellence

NATO Underwater Centre of Excellence

NATO Counter-Improvised Explosive Devices Centre of Excellence

NATO Cooperative Cyber Defence Centre of Excellence

NATO Cooperative Cyber Defence Centre of Excellence (former emblem)

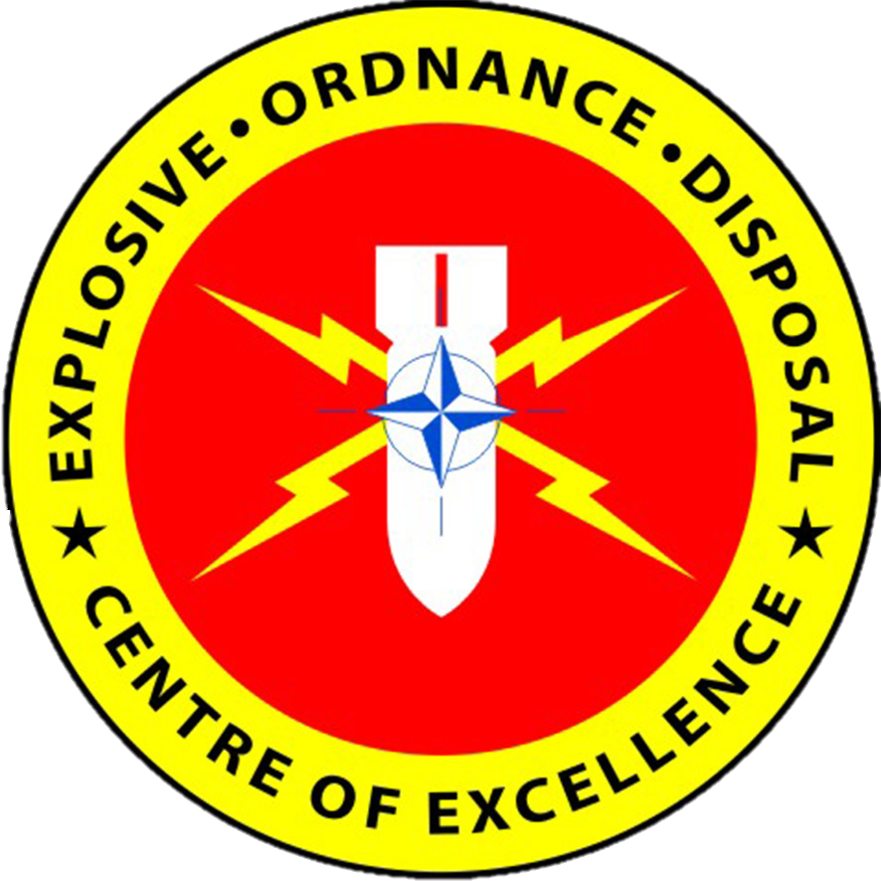
NATO Explosive Ordnance Disposal Centre of Excellence

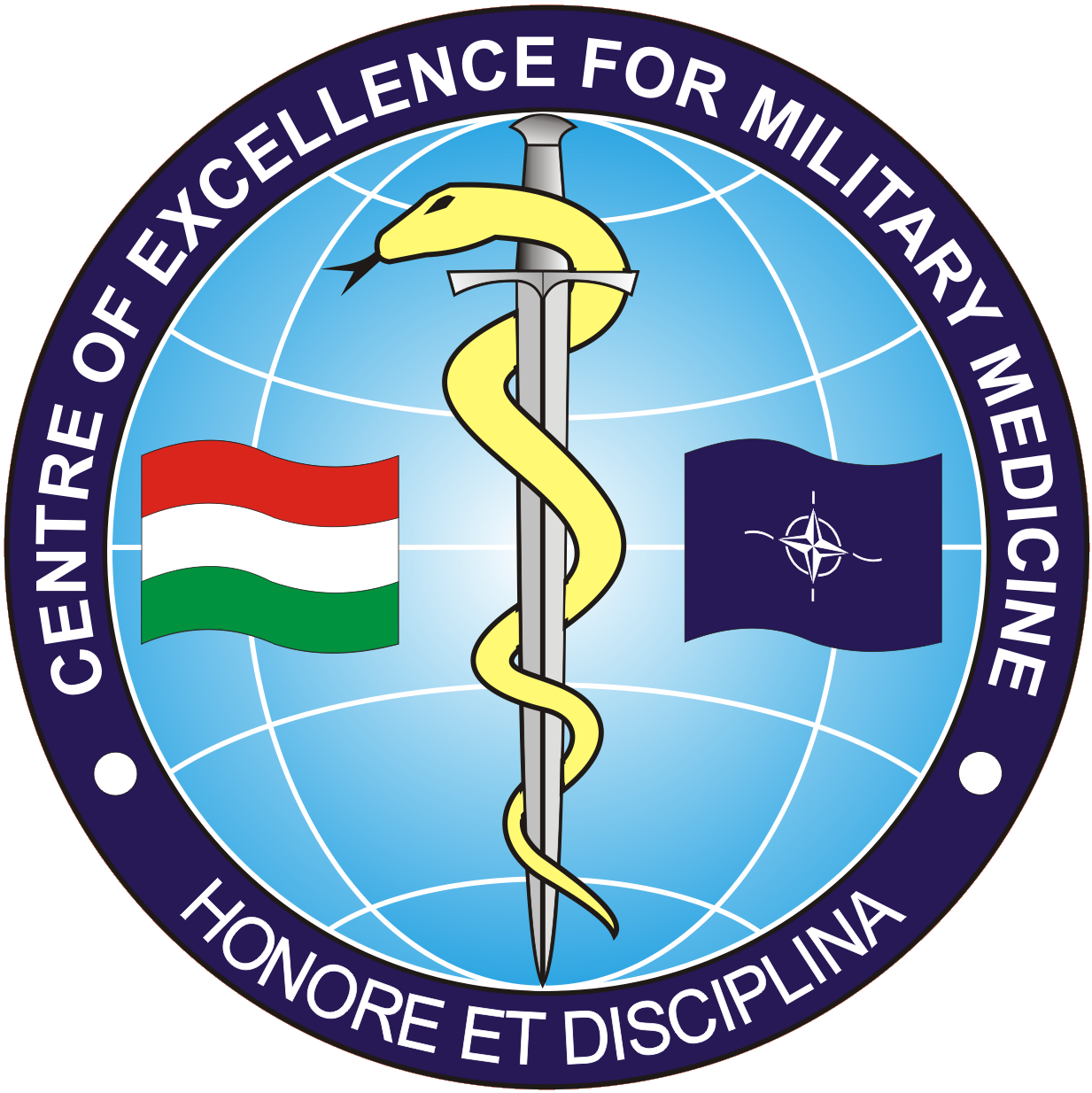
NATO Centre of Excellence for Military Medicine

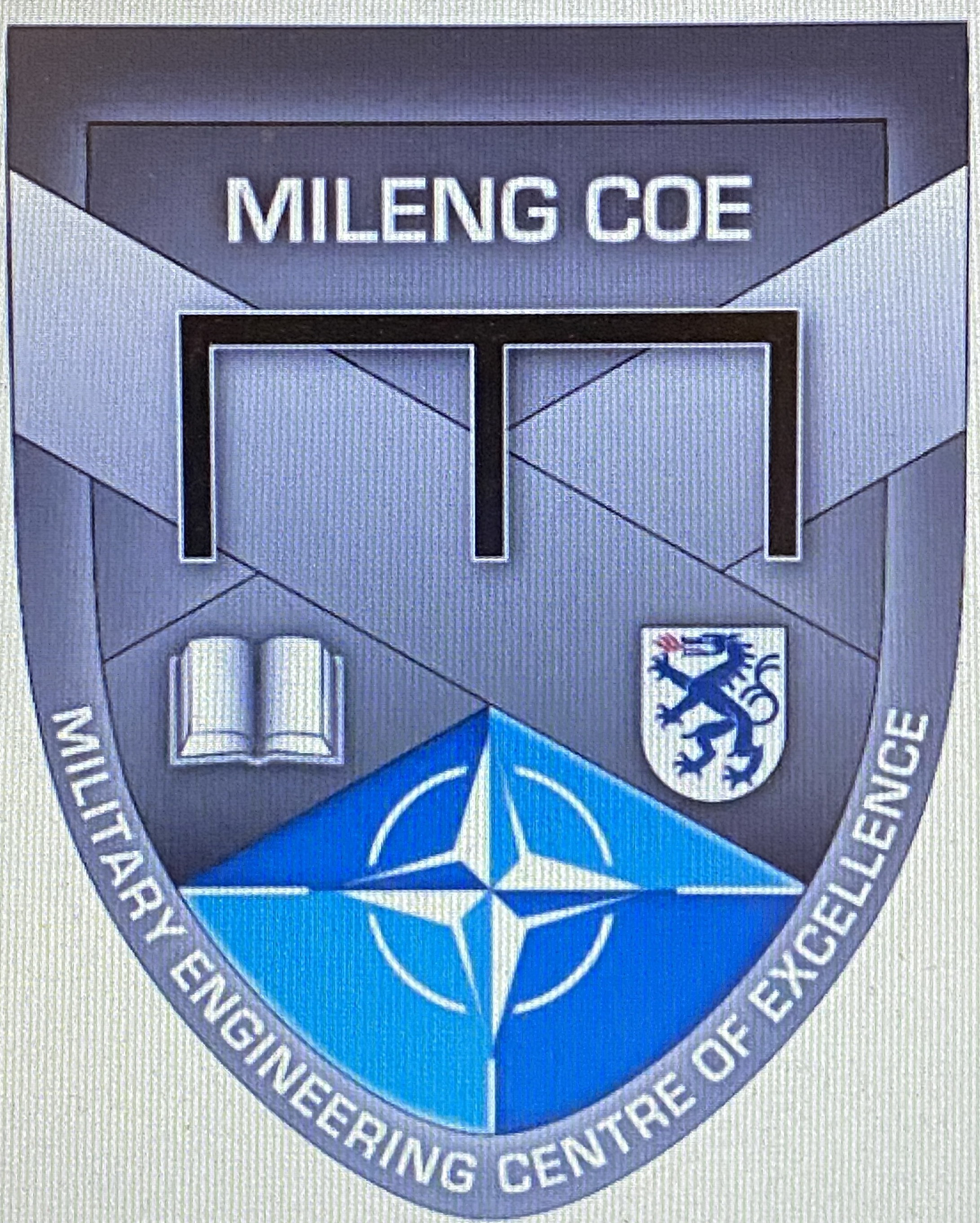
NATO Military Engineering Centre of Excellence

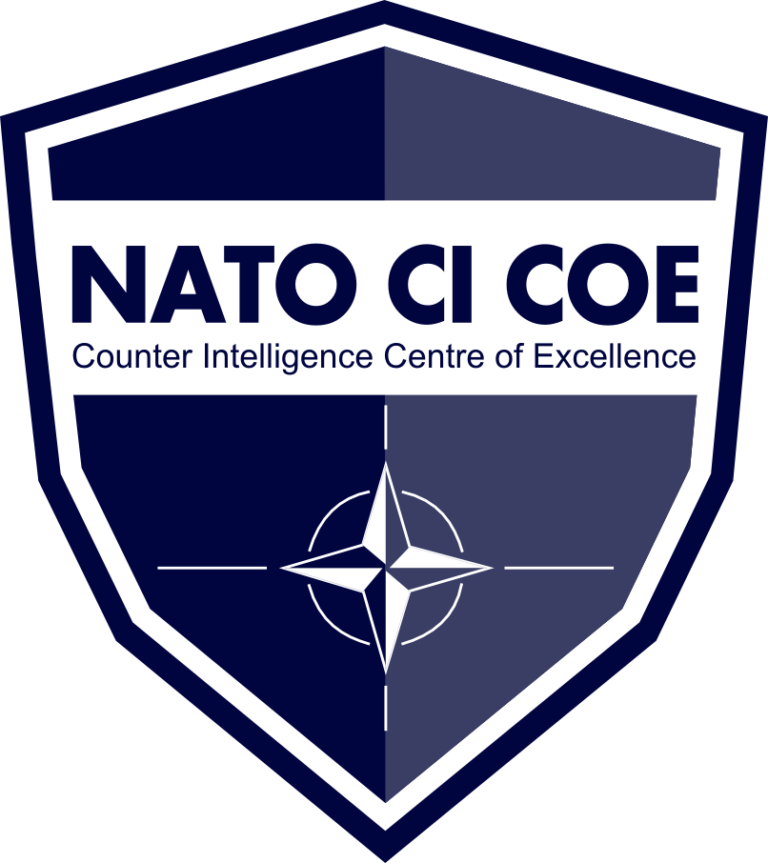
NATO Counter-Intelligence Centre of Excellence

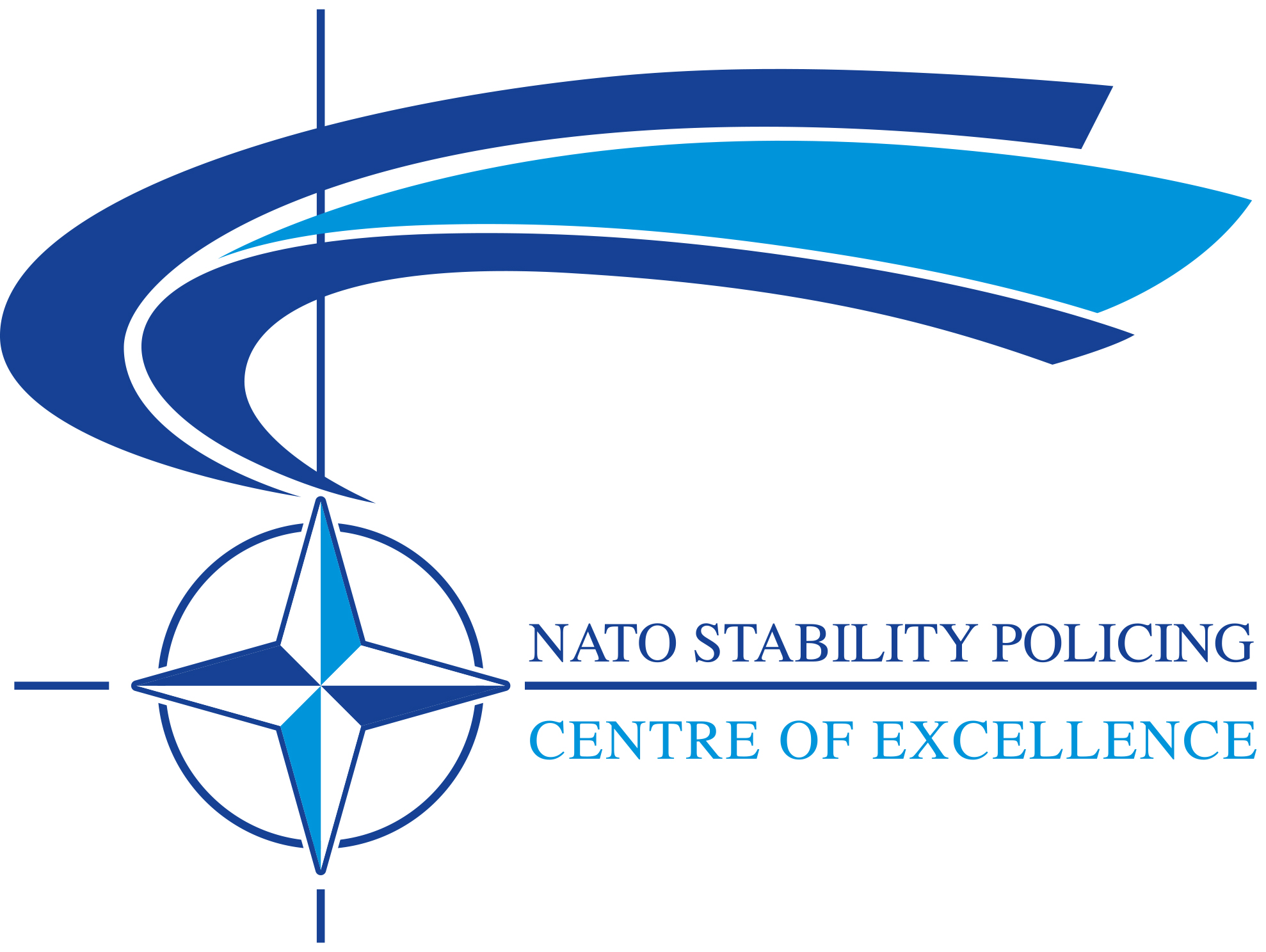
NATO Stability Policing Centre of Excellence

== Operations, missions and deployed formations ==
Kosovo Force

Enhanced Forward Presence

== Historical symbols ==
=== Historical commands and formations ===
Allied Forces Northern Europe

Allied Forces Northern Europe

Allied Command Atlantic

Allied Force Command Madrid

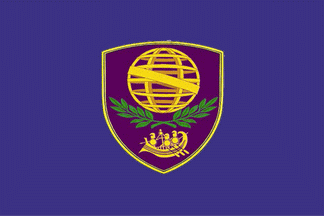
Allied Joint Force Command Lisbon

Combined Air Operations Center 8-Torrejón

=== Historical agencies and offices ===
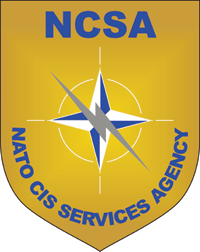
NATO Communications and Information Systems Services Agency

NATO Standardization Agency

NATO Standardization Agency

=== Historical NATO high-readiness forces ===
NATO Response Force
