= Edmund Giambastiani =

7th Vice Chairman of the Joint Chiefs of Staff

Edmund P. Giambastiani Jr.
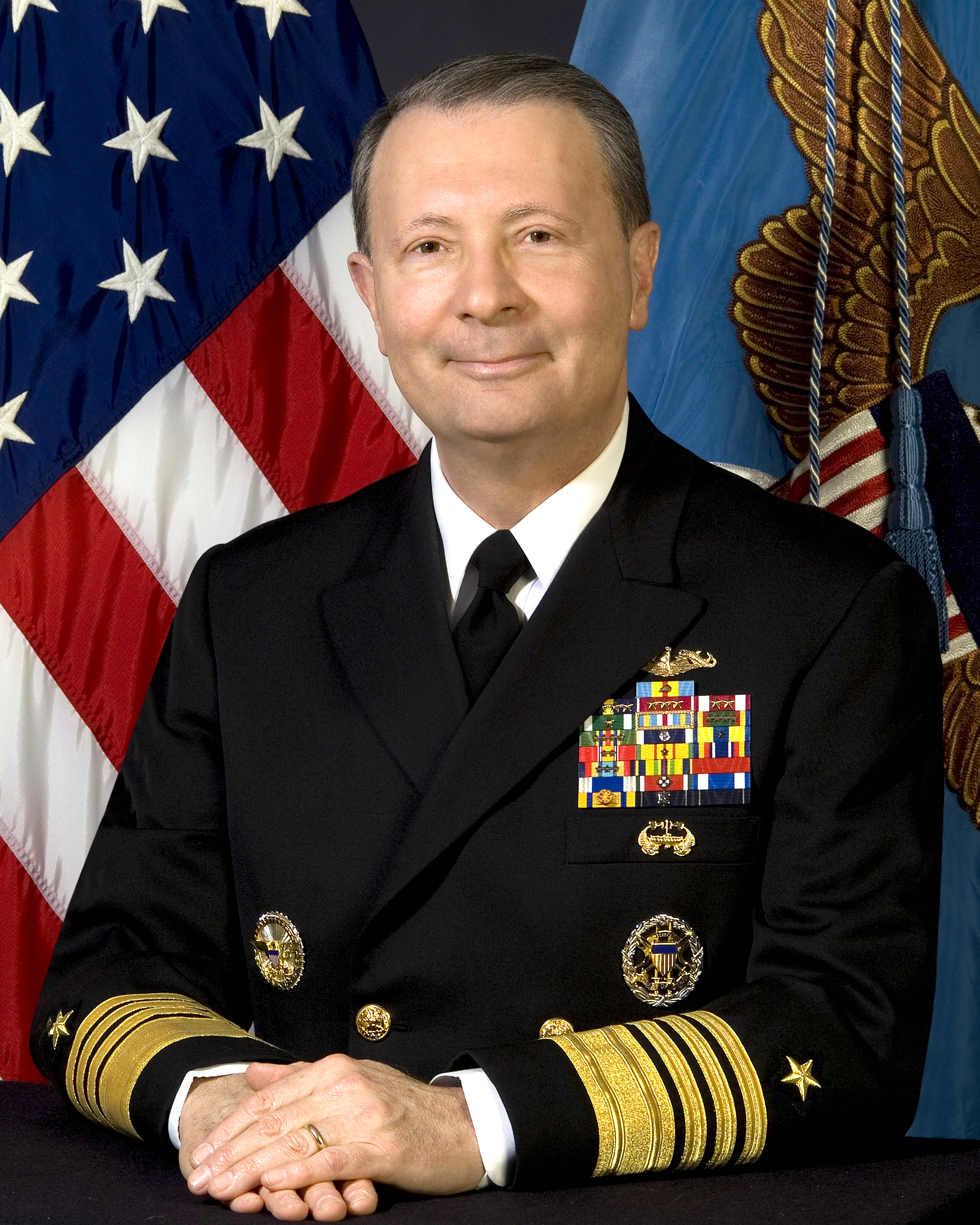
- Official portrait, 2007
- Born: May 4, 1948 (age 78); Canastota, New York, U.S.
- Military career
- Allegiance: United States
- Branch: United States Navy
- Service years: 1970–2007
- Rank: Admiral
- Commands: Vice Chairman of the Joint Chiefs of Staff; United States Joint Forces Command; Allied Command Transformation, NATO; Anti-Submarine and Reconnaissance Forces Atlantic; Submarines Allied Command Atlantic; Atlantic Fleet Submarine Force; Submarine Development Squadron Twelve; USS Richard B. Russell; NR-1 Deep Submergence Craft
- Conflicts: Vietnam War
- Awards: Defense Distinguished Service Medal (3); Navy Distinguished Service Medal (5); Legion of Merit (4)

Edmund Peter Giambastiani Jr. (born May 4, 1948) is a retired United States Navy admiral who served as the seventh vice chairman of the Joint Chiefs of Staff from 2005 to 2007. He retired in 2007, after 37 years of service.

== Early life and education ==
Giambastiani was born on May 4, 1948, in Canastota, New York. He graduated from the United States Naval Academy with leadership distinction in 1970.

== Naval career ==
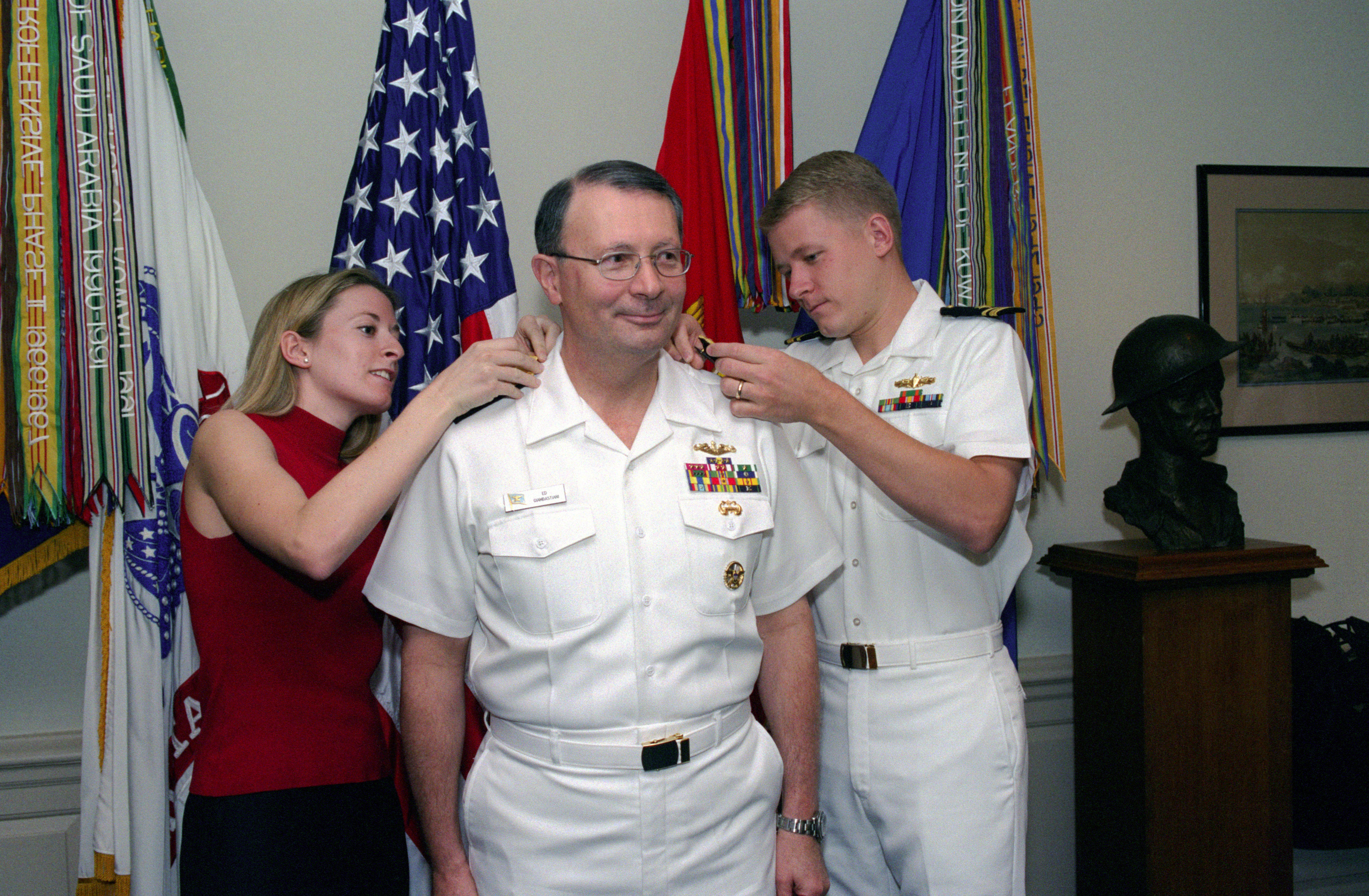
Giambastiani is pinned with the rank of admiral on September 4, 2002.

Giambastiani's operational assignments included several in which he was responsible for both demanding at-sea operations and the development of new technologies and experimental processes. Early sea assignments included USS Puffer (SSN-652) and the USS Francis Scott Key (SSBN-657)'s blue crew. While assigned to USS Puffer, he was a 1973 winner of the Fleet Commander's Junior Officer Submarine Shiphandling Competition. He commanded the NR-1 Deep Submergence Craft, the Navy's only nuclear powered deep diving ocean engineering and research submarine and USS Richard B. Russell, where the crew was awarded three consecutive Battle Efficiency "E"s, three Navy Unit Commendations, and two Fleet Commander Silver Anchors for excellence in enlisted retention.

Giambastiani also led Submarine Development Squadron Twelve, an operational submarine squadron that also serves as the Navy's Warfare Center of Excellence for submarine doctrine and tactics. Established in 1949, Submarine Development Squadron Twelve is the oldest experimental unit of its kind in the U.S. military. He served as the first director of strategy and concepts at the Naval Doctrine Command, as well as Commander, Atlantic Fleet Submarine Force; Commander, Submarines Allied Command Atlantic; and Commander, Anti-Submarine and Reconnaissance Forces Atlantic in Norfolk, Virginia.

Giambastiani's other shore and staff assignments include duties as an enlisted program manager at the Navy Recruiting Command Headquarters, Washington, D.C., in the early days of the all volunteer force; Special Assistant to the Deputy Director for Intelligence, Central Intelligence Agency; and, a fellowship with the Chief of Naval Operations' Strategic Studies Group. As a flag officer, he served as the Deputy Chief of Staff for Resources, Warfare Requirements and Assessments for the Commander, United States Pacific Fleet; Director of Submarine Warfare for the Chief of Naval Operations; Deputy Chief of Naval Operations for Resources, Requirements, and Assessments; and as the Senior Military Assistant to Secretary of Defense Donald H. Rumsfeld. His previous assignment was as NATO's first Supreme Allied Commander Transformation (SACT) and as Combatant Commander of United States Joint Forces Command, where he led the transformation of NATO and U.S. military forces, capabilities and doctrines and the introduction of new technologies, from October 2, 2002, to August 1, 2005.

In 2003, in his capacity as Commander, United States Joint Forces Command, Giambastiani published a "lessons learned" report. While generally praising U.S. performance it highlighted numerous incidents of friendly fire.

=== Vice Chairman of the Joint Chiefs of Staff ===
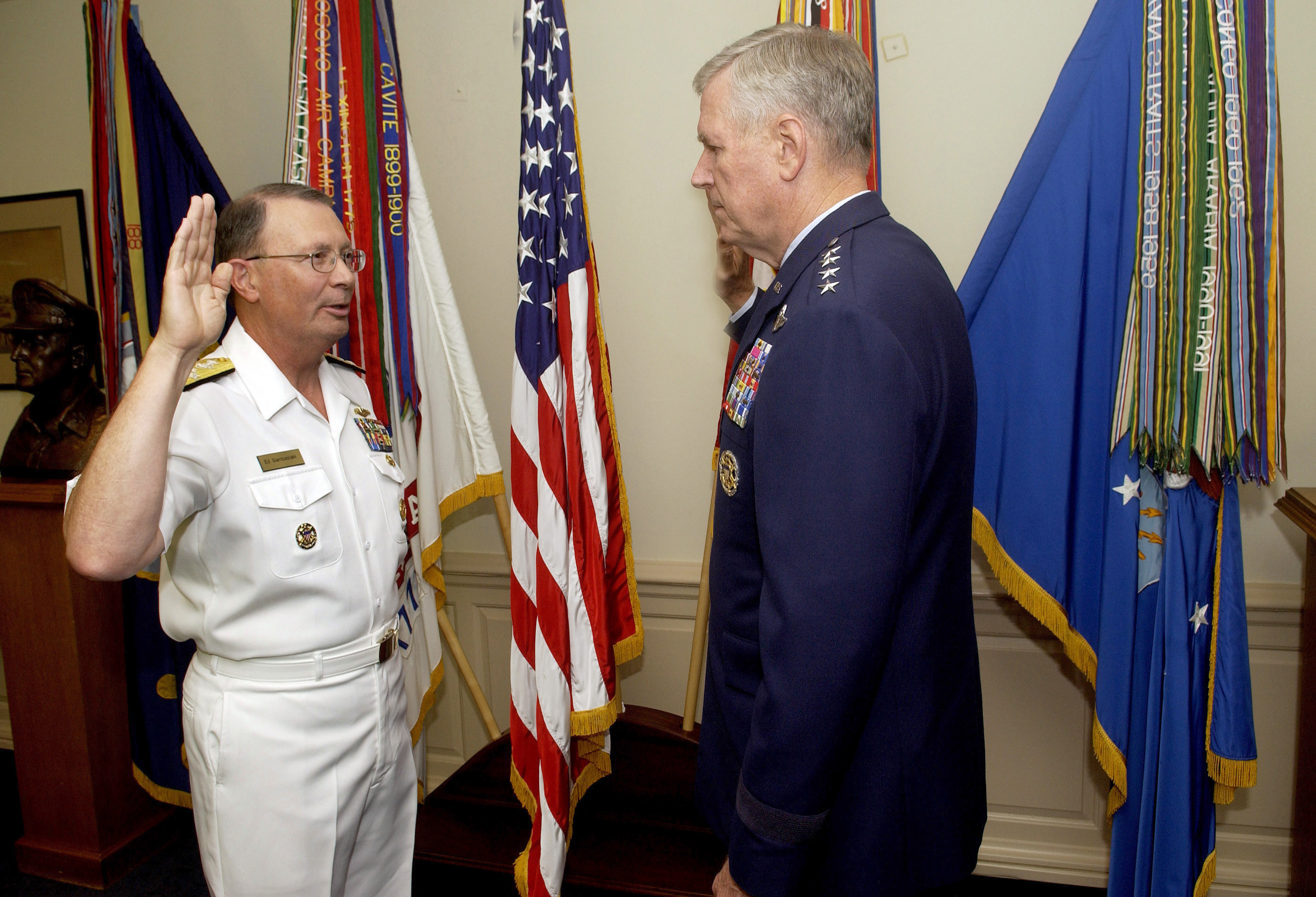
Adm. Edmund P. Giambastiani, left, is sworn in as vice chairman of the Joint Chiefs of Staff by the chairman, Gen. Richard B. Myers, during a ceremony at the Pentagon, Aug. 12, 2005.

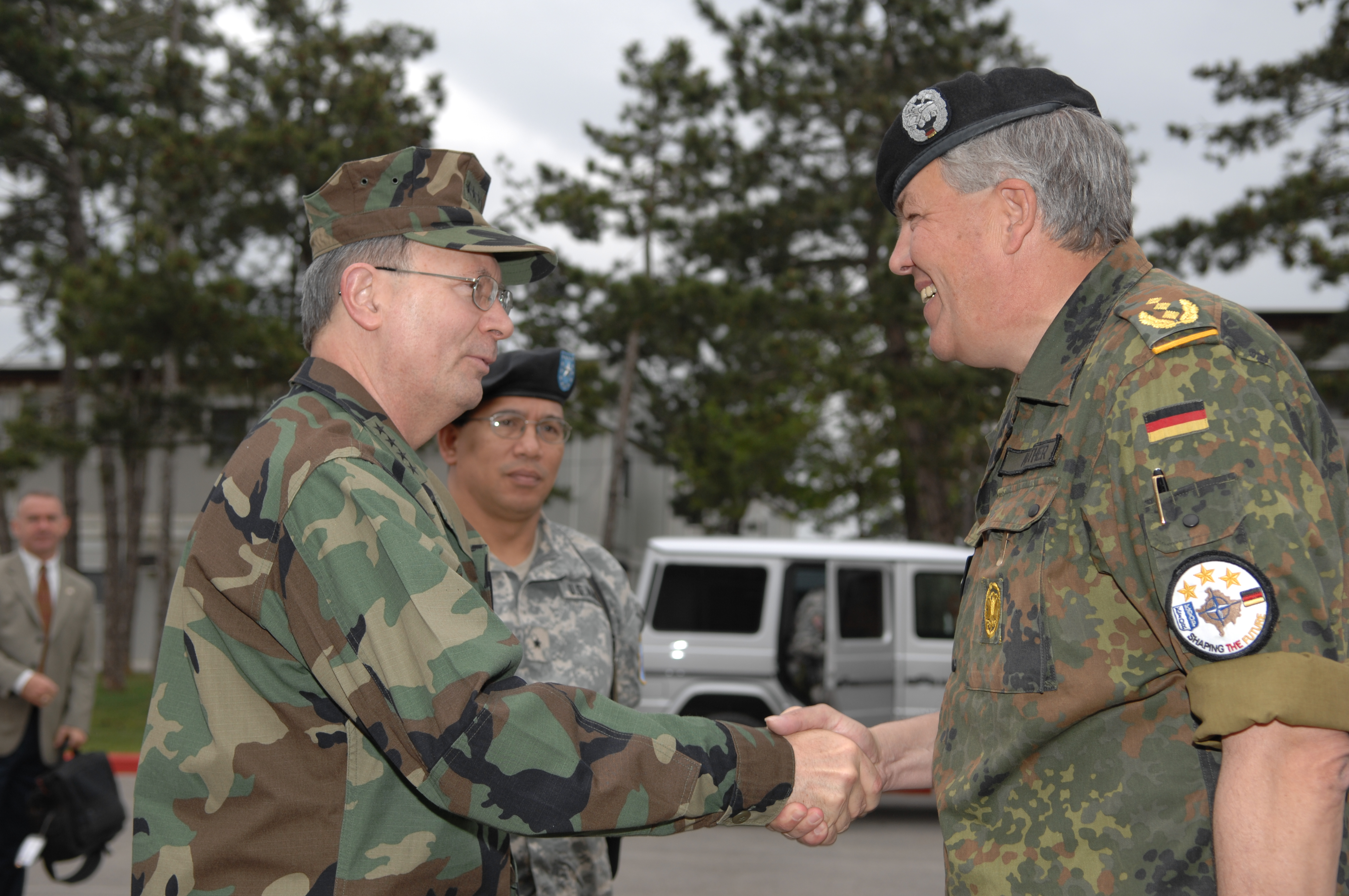
Giambastiani in May 2007, greeting German Lieutenant General Roland Kather, commander of Kosovo Forces, at the KFOR headquarters in Film City, Kosovo, as American Brigadier General Albert Bryant Jr., KFOR chief of staff, looks on.

On August 12, 2005, Giambastiani was sworn in as the seventh Vice Chairman of the Joint Chiefs of Staff, becoming the third naval officer to hold that position.

As Vice Chairman, Giambastiani chaired the Joint Requirements Oversight Council, co-chaired the Defense Acquisition Board, and served as a member of the National Security Council Deputies Committee, the Nuclear Weapons Council and the Missile Defense Executive Board. In addition, he worked with the Deputy Secretary of Defense Gordon R. England as Co-Chair of the Deputies Advisory Working Group, which oversees implementation of the 2006 Quadrennial Defense Review and other high level Departmental business issues.

On May 4–6, 2007, Giambastiani visited Tunisia, meeting with high-ranking military and civilian officials, including his Tunisian counterparts and Tunisian Foreign Minister Abdelwaheb Abdallah and Defense Minister Kamel Morjane. He went to the North Africa American Cemetery and Memorial on the outskirts of Tunis to pay his respects to fallen U.S. soldiers who had died there during the Tunisia campaign of World War II.

On June 1, 2007, Giambastiani announced his retirement from the military to spend more time with his family and pursue other ventures. He retired on July 27, 2007.

== Post-military career ==
Giambastiani's personal interests include amateur radio, for which he uses the call sign N4OC. He also currently serves as a guiding coalition member of the Project on National Security Reform. He also serves on the Advisory Board of Massachusetts Institute of Technology's Lincoln Laboratory and the Board of Trustees of the Mitre Corporation.

On October 8, 2009, airplane maker Boeing Co. announced that Giambastiani had been elected to its board of directors, effective immediately. The Seattle Times reported that "In a statement, Boeing chairman and chief executive Jim McNerney indicated that the addition of Giambastiani, who was the second-highest ranking officer in the U.S. military, is intended [...] to boost Boeing's influence with the Pentagon."

== Dates of rank ==
Ensign	Lieutenant (junior grade)	Lieutenant	Lieutenant Commander	Commander	Captain
O-1	O-2	O-3	O-4	O-5	O-6
June 3, 1970	September 3, 1971	July 1, 1974	September 1, 1978	April 22, 1982	September 1, 1989

Rear Admiral (lower half)	Rear Admiral (upper half)	Vice Admiral	Admiral
O-7	O-8	O-9	O-10
October 1, 1995	August 1, 1997	May 6, 1998	October 2, 2002

== Awards and decorations ==
=== Medals and ribbons ===
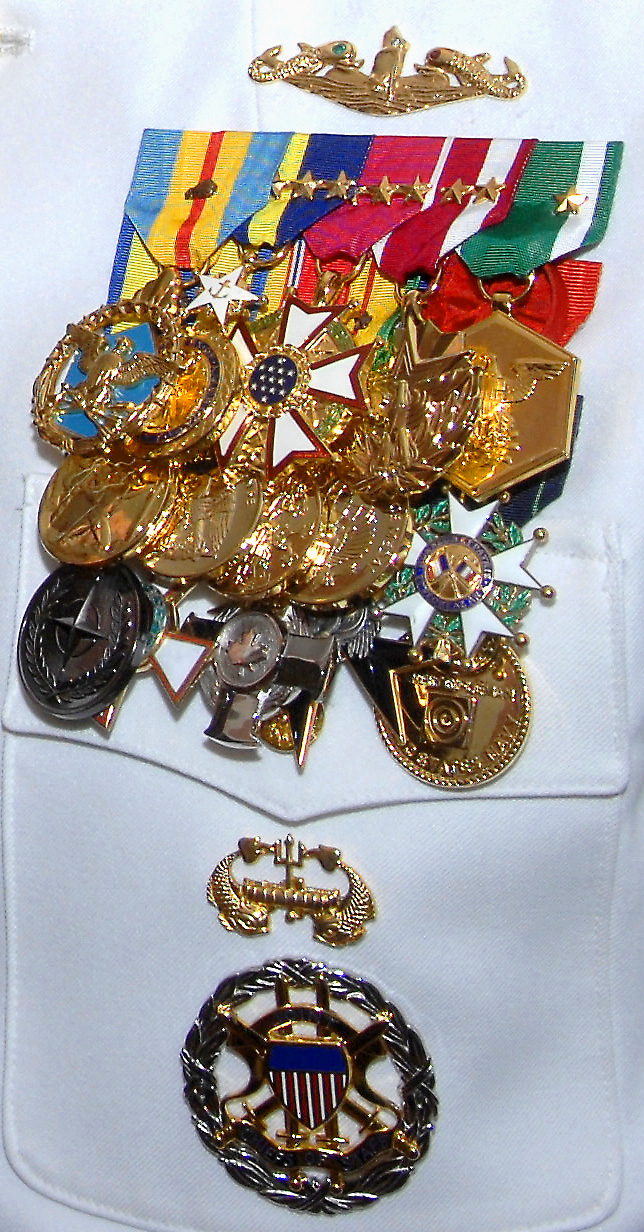
Giambastiani's medals as of July 27, 2007.

- Submarine Warfare insignia (Officer)
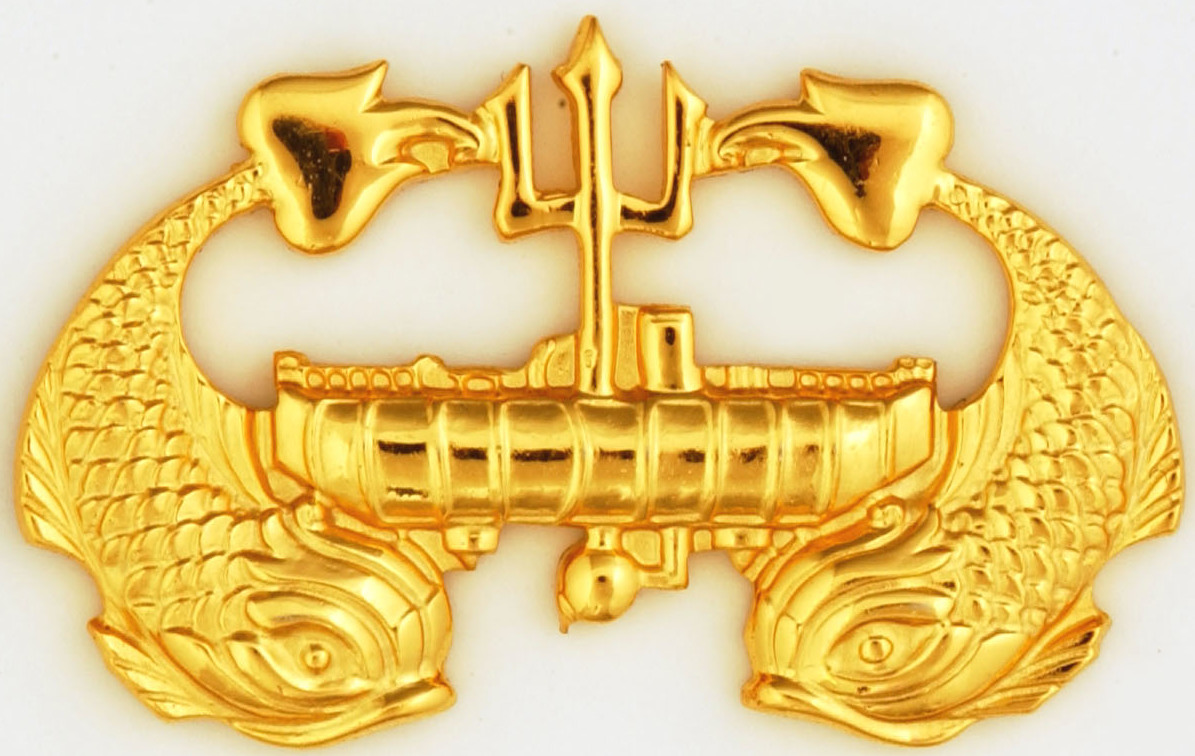
- Deep Submergence insignia (Officer)
- Office of the Joint Chiefs of Staff Identification Badge
- Office of the Secretary of Defense Identification Badge

His decorations include numerous personal and unit decorations, medals and ribbons including:

Defense Distinguished Service Medal with two bronze oak leaf clusters
Navy Distinguished Service Medal with four golden award stars
Legion of Merit with three award stars
Meritorious Service Medal with two award stars
Navy Commendation Medal with award star
Joint Meritorious Unit Award
Navy Unit Commendation with four bronze service stars
Navy Meritorious Unit Commendation with four service stars
Navy "E" Ribbon w/ Wreathed Battle E device (8 awards)
Navy Expeditionary Medal with service star
National Defense Service Medal with 2 service stars
Vietnam Service Medal with bronze campaign star (1 campaign)
Global War on Terrorism Service Medal
Navy Sea Service Deployment Ribbon with 3 bronze stars
Navy Recruiting Service Ribbon
Officer of the French Legion of Honour (elevated from Knight)
Order of Merit of the Republic of Hungary Commander's Cross
Meritorious Service Cross, Military version (M.S.C.) (Canada)
Order of the Cross of the Eagle, First Class (Estonia) (elevated from Fourth Class)
NATO Meritorious Service Medal
Navy Expert Rifleman Medal
Navy Pistol Marksmanship Ribbon

Military offices
Preceded by Deborah Loewer	Senior Military Assistant to the Secretary of Defense; 2001–2002	Succeeded by Bantz J. Craddock
Preceded by William F. Kernan	Commander of the United States Joint Forces Command; 2002–2005	Succeeded by Lance L. Smith
New title	Supreme Allied Commander Transformation; 2003-2005	Succeeded by Lance L. Smith
Preceded by Peter Pace	Vice Chairman of the Joint Chiefs of Staff; 2005–2007	Succeeded by James E. Cartwright
