= JATEC =

Joint NATO–Ukraine organization in Poland

NATO-Ukraine Joint Analysis, Training, and Education Centre
- Other name: JATEC
- Founder: North Atlantic Council
- Founding leader: ACT (with HQ SACT)
- Leaders: (first) GAA Philippe Lavigne; Admiral Pierre Vandier (since September 23, 2024)
- Military leader: SACT
- Political leader: NAC, with DPPC (Note: Defence Policy and Planning Committee of NATO.)
- JATEC Commander: BRG Wojciech Ozga
- Founding directives: Knowledge repository (ongoing, other wars)
- Organization type: Sui generis jointly-run
- Founded: July 11, 2024 (Note: at the 2024 Washington NATO summit, after the February 15, 2024, approval of the NATO-Ukraine Council (NUC))
- Dates active: December 16, 2024–present
- Country: Poland
- Allegiance: Ukraine; NATO
- Headquarters: Bydgoszcz, PL (OpCenter)
- Status: Multinational, active
- Size: ~70 personnel
- Part of: JALLC-UKR Initiative (Note: The JALLC-UKR Initiative launched in 2024 is connected to the Joint Analysis and Lessons Learned Centre (JALLC, of NATO SACT), which is based in Monsanto, Lisbon, Portugal. It is a dedicated effort within JALLC focused on the Russo-Ukrainian War. JALLC-UKR Initiative Information Centre on the NATO Lessons Learned Portal, in September 2024, published a report Two Years of NATO Lessons Relating to Russia's War Against Ukraine, presenting findings from analyses between March 2022 and March 2024. The report covers command and control, joint effects, and cooperation with organizations, and it highlights the dual nature of lessons learned, including new technologies and conventional warfare aspects. It emphasizes the need for NATO to develop new technologies while maintaining traditional methods.)
- Website: Official website
- Notes

The Joint Analysis, Training and Education Centre (JATEC; Polish: Centrum Analiz, Szkolenia i Edukacji NATO-Ukraina) is a joint NATO–Ukraine civil-military organization located in Bydgoszcz, Poland. It was officially inaugurated on February 17, 2025, and represents the first collaborative center of its kind between NATO and Ukraine.

== Organization and role ==
JATEC is part of the NATO Military Command Structure and is directly subordinate to the Supreme Allied Commander Transformation (SACT). The center is led by a Polish Brigadier General (Wojciech Ozga) and is designed to analyze civil-military experiences from the Russo-Ukrainian War. Lessons learned are integrated into the strategies, policies, doctrines, and operations of both NATO and Ukraine to enhance interoperability and strengthen collective security.

JATEC aims to improve NATO–Ukraine interoperability, support transformation in deterrence, defense, crisis prevention, crisis management, and cooperative security, apply lessons from ongoing conflicts to operational planning and strengthen NATO–Ukraine relations and provide long-term benefits for both parties.

In 2026, JATEC organized a series of seminars in Lublin, Poland, for officers of the Polish and German armed forces, focusing on lessons from Ukraine's experience in modern warfare. The seminars examined the impact of unmanned aerial systems (UAS), electronic warfare (EW), and intelligence support on tactical operations, as well as their implications for troop leadership, operational planning, and military decision-making. The event was held at the headquarters of the Lithuanian–Polish–Ukrainian Brigade (LITPOLUKRBRIG) as part of JATEC's support for the Captain's Training Course, which is supported in Ukraine by the Come Back Alive Charity.

== Location ==
Bydgoszcz is a strategic NATO site hosting several other facilities, including the Joint Force Training Centre (JFTC). The address of JATEC is ul. Szubińska 2, 85–312 Bydgoszcz, Poland.

== Subordination and cooperation ==
JATEC is one of several institutions directly reporting to Allied Command Transformation (ACT), alongside the Joint Warfare Centre (JWC) in Stavanger, Norway, the Joint Force Training Centre (JFTC) in Bydgoszcz, and the Joint Analysis and Lessons Learned Centre (JALLC) in Lisbon, Portugal.

These centers support ACT's efforts to transform NATO and collaborate with various national and multinational Centres of Excellence.

== See also ==
- NATO–Ukraine relations
