= Mark Stanhope =

Royal Navy Admiral (born 1952)

Admiral Sir Mark Stanhope GCB OBE DL
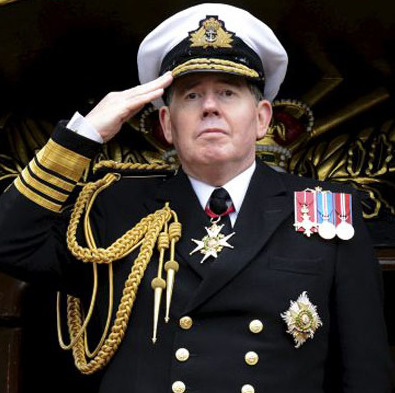
- Admiral Sir Mark Stanhope in 2013
- Born: 26 March 1952 (age 74); Hammersmith, London, England
- Military career
- Allegiance: United Kingdom
- Branch: Royal Navy
- Service years: 1970–2013
- Rank: Admiral
- Commands: First Sea Lord; Commander-in-Chief Fleet; HMS Illustrious; HMS London; HMS Splendid; HMS Orpheus
- Conflicts: Sierra Leone Civil War; Libyan Civil War
- Awards: Knight Grand Cross of the Order of the Bath; Officer of the Order of the British Empire; Officer of the Legion of Merit (United States)

Admiral Sir Mark Stanhope, GCB, OBE, DL (born 26 March 1952) is a retired Royal Navy officer. After serving as a submarine commander, he commanded a frigate and then commanded an aircraft carrier on operational patrol off Sierra Leone. He went on to be Deputy Supreme Allied Commander Transformation and then Commander-in-Chief Fleet. He served as First Sea Lord and Chief of the Naval staff, the professional head of the Royal Navy, from July 2009 to April 2013. In this role he advised the British Government on the deployment of naval forces during operations around Libya. He was succeeded by Admiral Sir George Zambellas in April 2013.

== Early life ==
Born the son of Frederick William Stanhope and Shiela Mary Hattemore (née Cutler), Stanhope was educated at the London Nautical School, Worthing High School for Boys (since 1974 first Worthing Sixth-Form College and more recently Worthing College), and then St Peter's College, Oxford, where he gained a Master of Arts in physics.

== Naval career ==
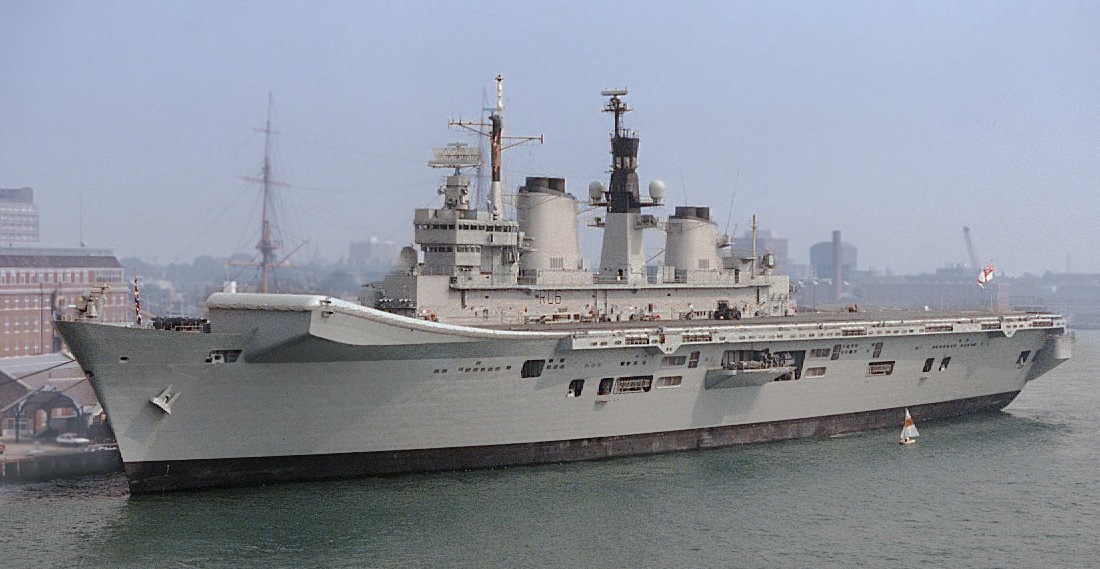
The aircraft carrier HMS Illustrious which Stanhope commanded during an operational deployment off Sierra Leone

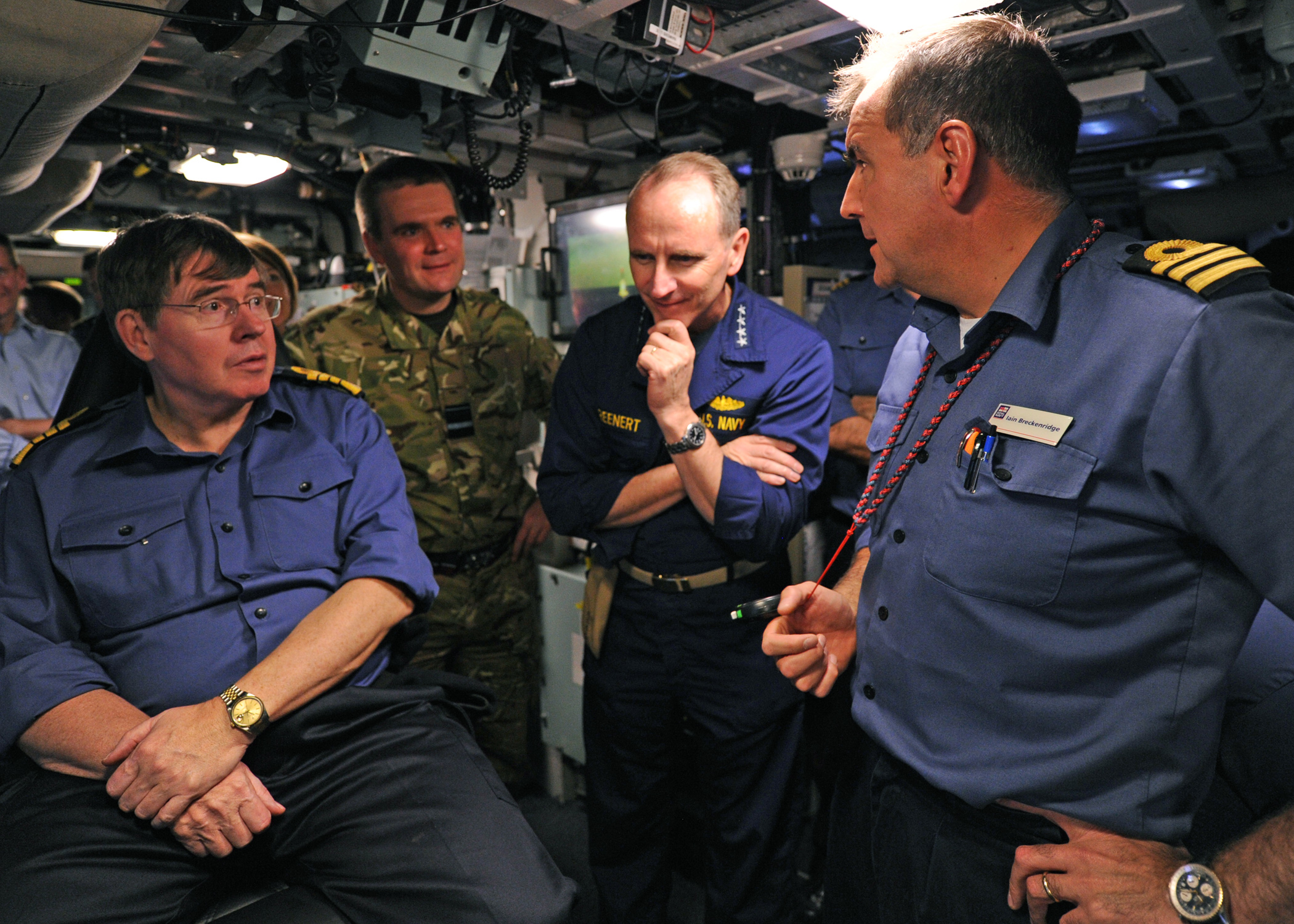
Stanhope on board the submarine HMS Astute

Stanhope joined the Royal Navy in 1970, was confirmed in the rank of sub-lieutenant on 1 September 1972, and was promoted to full lieutenant on 1 May 1977. Promoted to lieutenant commander on 16 October 1982, he commanded the submarine HMS Orpheus from 1982 to 1984. After receiving promotion to commander on 30 June 1986, he commanded the submarine HMS Splendid from 1987 to 1988. He became a teaching officer on the Submarine Command Course in 1989.

Promoted to captain on 30 June 1991, Stanhope then went on to command the frigate HMS London from 1991 to 1992 before becoming Captain, Submarine Sea Training in 1993. He was appointed Deputy Principal staff Officer to the Chief of the Defence staff at the Ministry of Defence in 1994 and then attended the Royal College of Defence Studies in 1997. He commanded the aircraft carrier HMS Illustrious from 1998 to 2000 during which time that ship was deployed on operational patrol off Sierra Leone. Promoted to rear admiral, he became Director of Operational Management at NATO Regional Command North in 2000 and was seconded to the Cabinet Office in 2002 before being promoted to vice admiral and becoming Deputy Commander-in-Chief Fleet in July 2002.

Promoted to full admiral on 10 July 2004, Stanhope became Deputy Supreme Allied Commander Transformation at NATO that year. In November 2007 he became Commander-in-Chief Fleet and took the honorary position of Vice-Admiral of the United Kingdom.

Stanhope succeeded Admiral Sir Jonathon Band as First Sea Lord and Chief of the Naval staff in July 2009. On 11 March 2011, Stanhope addressed the crew of HMS Ark Royal for the final time, lamenting the loss of carrier strike capability, commenting that "the decision to gap the United Kingdom’s Carrier Strike capability was not one taken lightly, or easily." Paying tribute to the crew upon "the dignity with which you have greeted this difficult news." In June 2011, during operations around Libya, he warned that the fleet would only be able to sustain operations for around 90 days, after which the Government would have to rebalance priorities. On 24 June 2011 The Daily Telegraph confirmed that Stanhope, in common with the Chief of the Air Staff and the Chief of the General Staff, would lose his position on the Defence Board, the highest non-ministerial Ministry of Defence committee, which makes decisions on all aspect of military policy. He was succeeded as First Sea Lord and Chief of the Naval staff by Admiral Sir George Zambellas in April 2013.

== Family ==
In 1975 Stanhope married Janet Anne Flynn; they have one daughter. Lady Stanhope was the Director of Resources at Devon County Council for four years.

== Awards and decorations ==
Stanhope was appointed an Officer of the Order of the British Empire in the 1989 New Year Honours list. He was appointed be a Knight Commander of the Order of the Bath in the 2004 New Year Honours. He was advanced to Knight Grand Cross of that order in the 2010 Birthday Honours.

Stanhope is an Honorary Fellow of St. Peter's College, Oxford, a Deputy Lieutenant of Devon, a Freeman of the City of London, the President of the Marine Society & Sea Cadets and a Liveryman of the Upholders' Company as well as a Younger Brother of Trinity House. He reports his interests in Who's Who as family life, reading and sailing.

Stanhope was also awarded an Honorary Doctorate of Science from Plymouth University in 2012.

Military offices
Preceded by Sir Jonathon Band	Deputy Commander-in-Chief Fleet; 2002–2004	Succeeded by Sir Timothy McClement
Preceded by Sir Ian Forbes	Deputy Supreme Allied Commander Transformation; 2004–2007	Succeeded by Luciano Zappata
Preceded by Sir James Burnell-Nugent	Commander-in-Chief Fleet; 2007–2009	Succeeded by Sir Trevor Soar
Preceded by Sir Jonathon Band	First Sea Lord; 2009–2013	Succeeded by Sir George Zambellas
Honorary titles
Preceded by Sir James Burnell-Nugent	Vice-Admiral of the United Kingdom; 2007–2009	Succeeded by Sir Trevor Soar
