= Mirco Zuliani =

Italian Air Force general

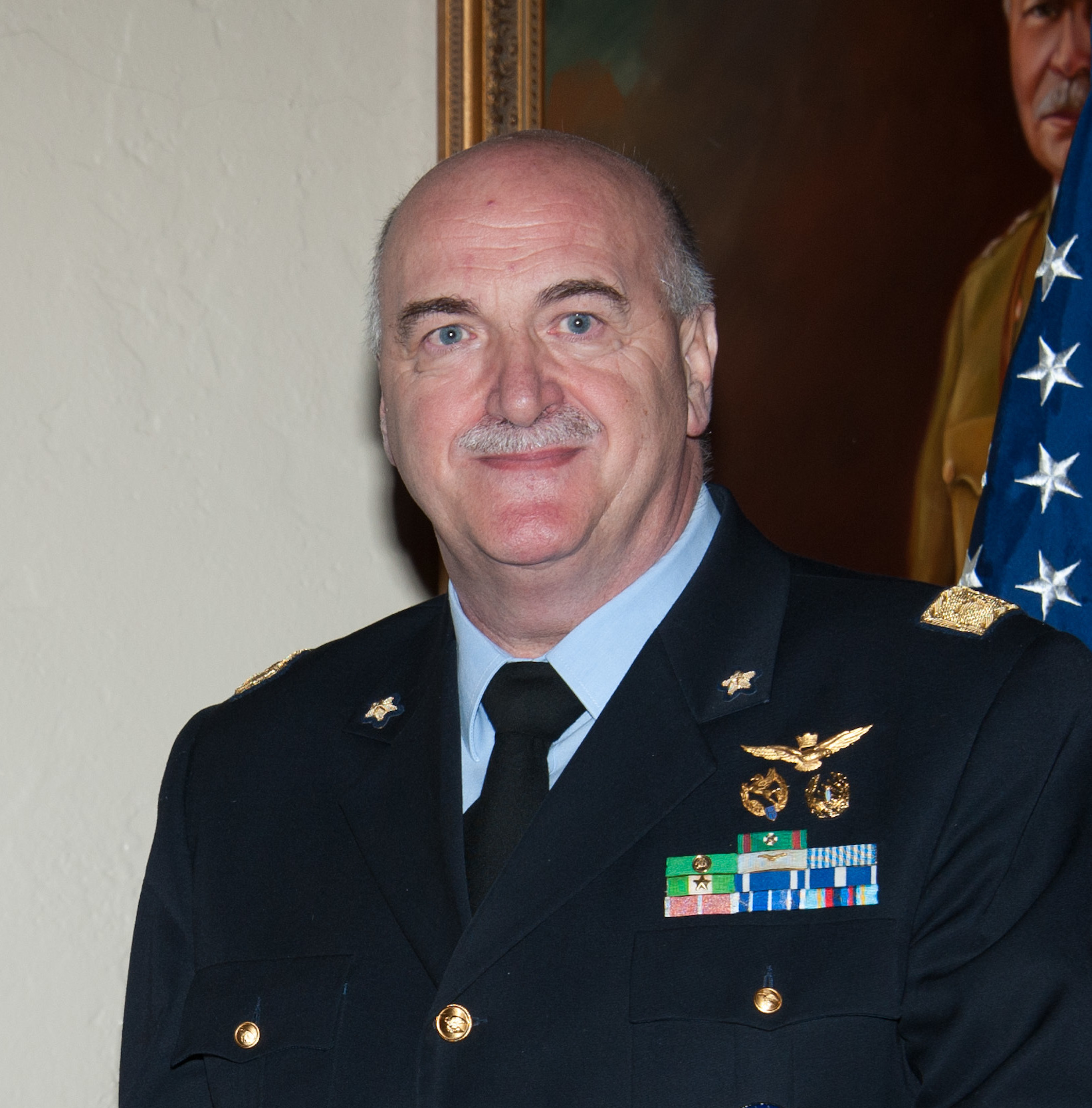
- Born: 3 February 1953 (age 73)
- Military career
- Allegiance: Italy
- Branch: Italian Air Force
- Rank: General
- Commands: Deputy Supreme Allied Commander Transformation

General Mirco Zuliani (born 3 February 1953) is an Italian Air Force officer who served as Deputy Supreme Allied Commander Transformation at NATO.

Military offices
Preceded by Mieczysław Bieniek	Deputy Supreme Allied Commander Transformation; 2013 - 2016	Succeeded by Manfred Nielson
