= Lance L. Smith =

United States Air Force general

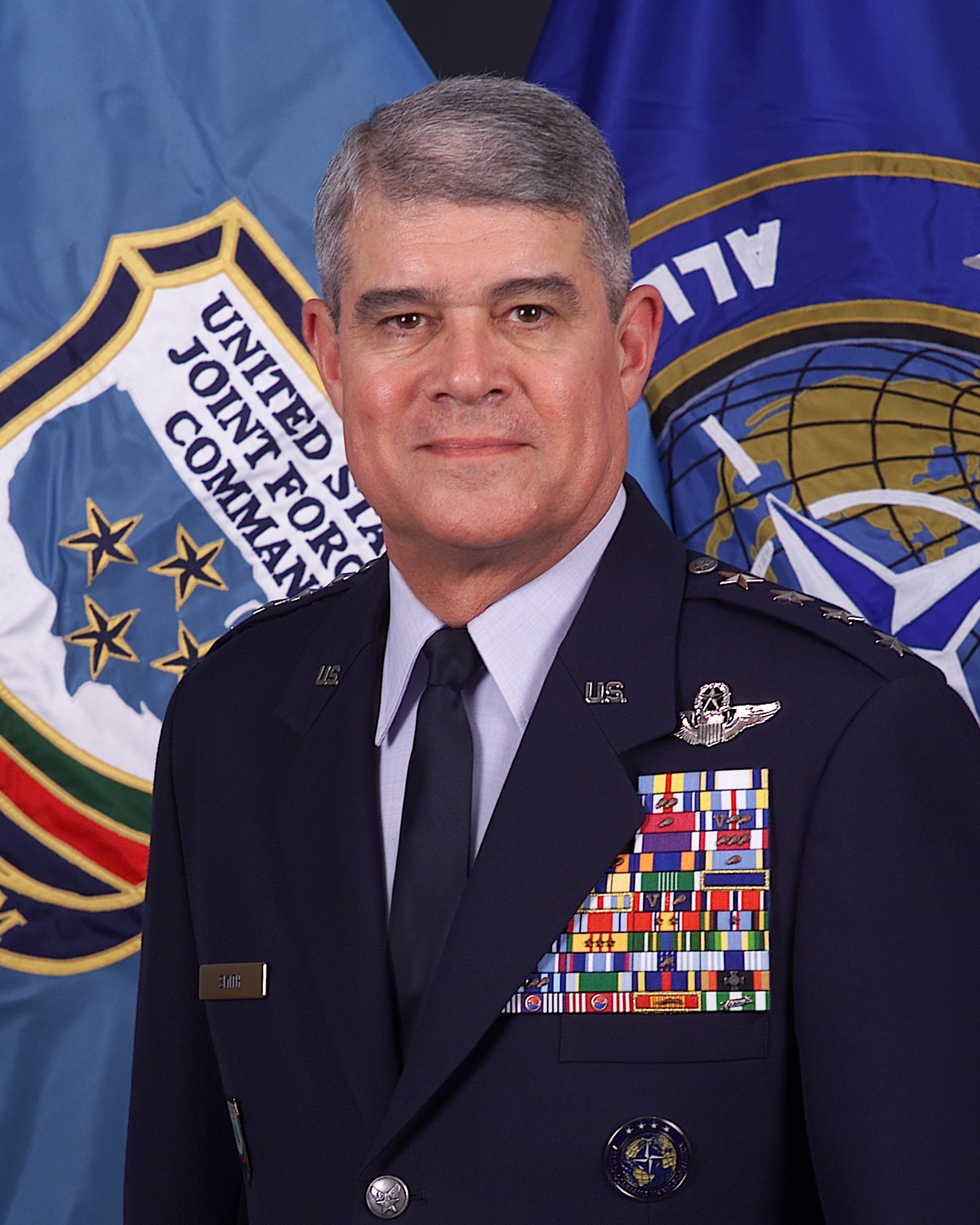
- General Lance L. Smith
- Born: September 18, 1946 (age 80); Akron, Ohio, U.S.
- Military career
- Allegiance: United States of America
- Branch: United States Air Force
- Service years: 1970-2008
- Rank: General
- Commands: U.S. Joint Forces Command; NATO Supreme Allied Command for Transformation; 7th Air Force; Air Force Doctrine Center; 4th Fighter Wing; 27th Fighter Wing
- Conflicts: Vietnam War
- Awards: Defense Distinguished Service Medal (3); Air Force Distinguished Service Medal; Silver Star (3); Legion of Merit (2); Distinguished Flying Cross (3); Purple Heart; Air Medal (10)

Lance L. Smith (born September 18, 1946) is a retired United States Air Force general who last served as the Commander, U.S. Joint Forces Command, Norfolk, Virginia, and NATO Supreme Allied Commander for Transformation from November 10, 2005, to November 9, 2007. A highly decorated combat veteran, the general retired from active duty on January 1, 2008.

Smith entered the United States Air Force in 1970 after graduating from Virginia Tech and completing Officer Training School. He served two tours at The Pentagon and was Commandant of the NATO School at Supreme Headquarters Allied Powers Europe, Commandant of Air War College, and Vice Commander of Air University. He commanded two fighter wings and led two air expeditionary force deployments to Southwest Asia: AEF III and the 4th Air Expeditionary Wing. He flew more than 165 combat missions in Southeast and Southwest Asia in the A-1 Skyraider and the F-15E Strike Eagle. A command pilot, he has more than 3,000 hours in various military aircraft.

== Education ==
- 1969 Bachelor of Arts degree in business management, Virginia Polytechnic Institute, Blacksburg, Virginia
- 1978 Master of Arts degree in business management, Central Michigan University, Mount Pleasant
- 1982 Air Command and Staff College, Maxwell Air Force Base, Alabama
- 1990 Army War College, Carlisle Barracks, Pennsylvania
- 1994 Advanced Executive Program, J.L. Kellogg Graduate School of Management, Northwestern University, Evanston, Illinois

== Assignments ==
- June 1970 - June 1971, student, undergraduate pilot training, Columbus AFB, Mississippi
- June 1971 - September 1971, A-1 combat crew training, Hurlburt Field, Florida
- October 1971 - October 1972, A-1 pilot, 1st Special Operations Squadron, Nakhon Phanom Royal Thai AFB, Thailand
- October 1972 - July 1973, instructor pilot training, Randolph AFB, Texas
- July 1973 - September 1977, instructor pilot and chief, check section, 96th Flying Training Squadron, Williams AFB, Arizona
- September 1977 - January 1979, staff officer, Air Staff Training Program, Deputy Chief of Staff for Personnel, the Pentagon, Washington, D.C.
- January 1979 - August 1981, student, A-7 Corsair conversion training, A-7D aircraft commander, flight commander and assistant operations officer, 76th Tactical Fighter Squadron, England AFB, Louisiana
- August 1981 - June 1982, student, Air Command and Staff College, Maxwell AFB, Alabama
- June 1982 - July 1986, Air Staff officer, Deputy Chief of Staff for Plans and Operations; Project Checkmate analyst for interdiction, Europe and Southwest Asia; Air Force team chief, Joint Assessment and Initiative Office, and executive officer to the Air Force Director of Operations, the Pentagon, Washington, D.C.
- July 1986 - July 1989, Chief of Safety, later, Assistant Deputy Commander for Operations, 354th Tactical Fighter Wing, Myrtle Beach AFB, South Carolina
- July 1989 - June 1990, student, Army War College, Carlisle Barracks, Pennsylvania
- June 1990 - August 1992, Commandant, NATO School, SHAPE, Oberammergau, Germany
- August 1992 - September 1993, Vice Commander, later, Commander, 27th Fighter Wing, Cannon AFB, New Mexico
- September 1993 - June 1995, Assistant Director of Operations, Headquarters Air Combat Command, Langley AFB, Virginia
- June 1995 - July 1997, Commander, 4th Fighter Wing, Seymour Johnson AFB, North Carolina
- July 1997 - August 1998, Vice Commander, 7th Air Force and U.S. Air Forces Korea, and Chief of Staff, Combined Republic of Korea and U.S. Air Component Command, Osan Air Base, South Korea
- September 1998 - December 1999, Commandant, Air War College, and Vice Commander, Air University, Maxwell AFB, Alabama
- December 1999 - November 2001, Commander, Air Force Doctrine Center, Maxwell AFB, Alabama
- November 2001 - October 2003, Deputy Commander, United Nations Command; Deputy Commander, U.S. Forces Korea; Commander, Air Component Command, Republic of Korea and U.S. Combined Forces Command; and Commander, 7th Air Force, Pacific Air Forces, Osan AB, South Korea
- October 2003 - November 2005, Deputy Commander, U.S. Central Command, MacDill AFB, Florida
- November 2005 - November 2007, Commander, U.S. Joint Forces Command, and NATO Supreme Allied Commander for Transformation, Norfolk, Virginia

== Flight information ==
- Rating: Command pilot
- Flight hours: More than 3,000
- Aircraft flown: T-33, T-37, T-38, A-1, A-7, A-10, F-111F, F-15E and F-16

== Major awards and decorations ==
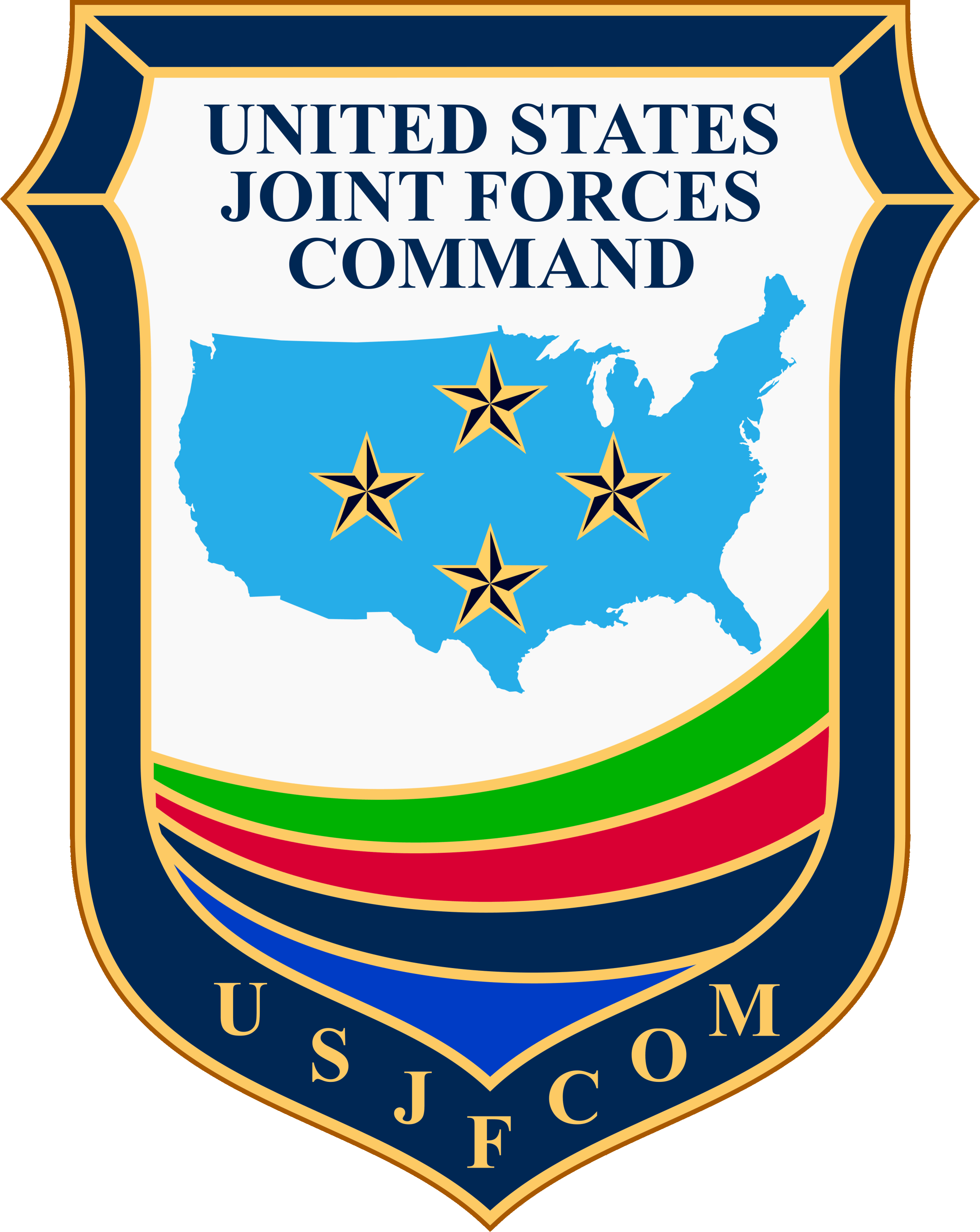
Air Force Command Pilot Badge
United States Joint Forces Command Badge
Allied Command Transformation Badge

Defense Distinguished Service Medal with two bronze oak leaf clusters
Air Force Distinguished Service Medal
Silver Star with two oak leaf clusters
Defense Superior Service Medal
Legion of Merit with oak leaf cluster
Distinguished Flying Cross with two bronze oak leaf clusters and Valor V
Purple Heart
Meritorious Service Medal with three oak leaf clusters
Air Medal (10 awards in total)
Air Medal
Aerial Achievement Medal with oak leaf cluster
Air Force Commendation Medal
Army Commendation Medal
Air Force Presidential Unit Citation
Joint Meritorious Unit Award
Air Force Outstanding Unit Award with two oak leaf clusters and Valor V
Air Force Organizational Excellence Award
Combat Readiness Medal
National Defense Service Medal with two bronze service stars
Armed Forces Expeditionary Medal with service star
Vietnam Service Medal with three service stars
Global War on Terrorism Expeditionary Medal
Korea Defense Service Medal
Armed Forces Service Medal
Humanitarian Service Medal
Air and Space Campaign Medal
Air Force Overseas Short Tour Service Ribbon with oak leaf cluster
Air Force Overseas Long Tour Service Ribbon
Air Force Longevity Service Award with one silver and three bronze oak leaf clusters
Small Arms Expert Marksmanship Ribbon
Air Force Training Ribbon
Bundeswehr Cross of Honor in Silver (Republic of Germany)
Order of National Security Merit (Korea), Gugseon Medal
Order of National Security Merit (Korea), Cheon-Su Medal
Meritorious Service Cross, Military Division (Canada)
Commemorative Medal of the Slovak Defense Ministry of the First Degree (Slovak Republic)
Vietnam Gallantry Cross Unit Citation
NATO Meritorious Service Medal
Vietnam Campaign Medal

== Promotions ==
Promotions
Insignia	Rank	Date
	General	87 Nov 2005
	Lieutenant General	1 Jan 2002
	Major General	1 Apr 1998
	Brigadier General	1 Jul 1995
	Colonel	1 Jul 1989
	Lieutenant Colonel	1 Feb 1982
	Major	4 Dec 1978
	Captain	18 Oct 1973
	First Lieutenant	11 Nov 1971
	Second Lieutenant	18 May 1970

Military offices
Preceded by Michael P. DeLong	Deputy Commander of the United States Central Command; 2003–2005	Succeeded by David C. Nichols
