= Luciano Zappata =

Italian Navy officer

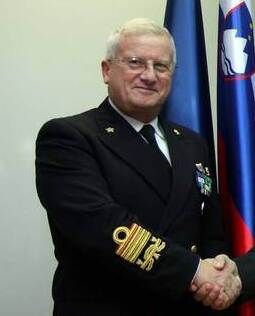
- Military career
- Allegiance: Italy
- Branch: Italian Navy
- Rank: Admiral
- Commands: Deputy Supreme Allied Commander Transformation; Deputy Chief of Staff of the Navy

Admiral Luciano Zappata is an Italian Navy officer who served as Deputy Supreme Allied Commander Transformation.

Zappata graduated from the Naval Academy in 1970.

From 1987 to 1988, he commanded the frigate ITS Espero and from 1992 to 1993 served as commanding officer of the cruiser ITS Vittorio Veneto, participating in Operation Restore Hope. He was promoted to rear admiral in December 1996, holding the positions of commander of the Second and Third Naval Divisions.

Zappata later served as Chief of Staff to Commander in Chief Naval Fleet and Vice Inspector for Naval Logistics Support. In January 2005, he was promoted to vice admiral and served as Deputy Chief of Staff of the Italian Navy. Before being promoted to admiral in June 2007 he served as Advisor to the Chief of Staff of the Italian Defence. He assumed the position of Deputy Supreme Allied Commander Transformation on July 2, 2007.
