= Pierre Vandier =

French admiral (born 1967)

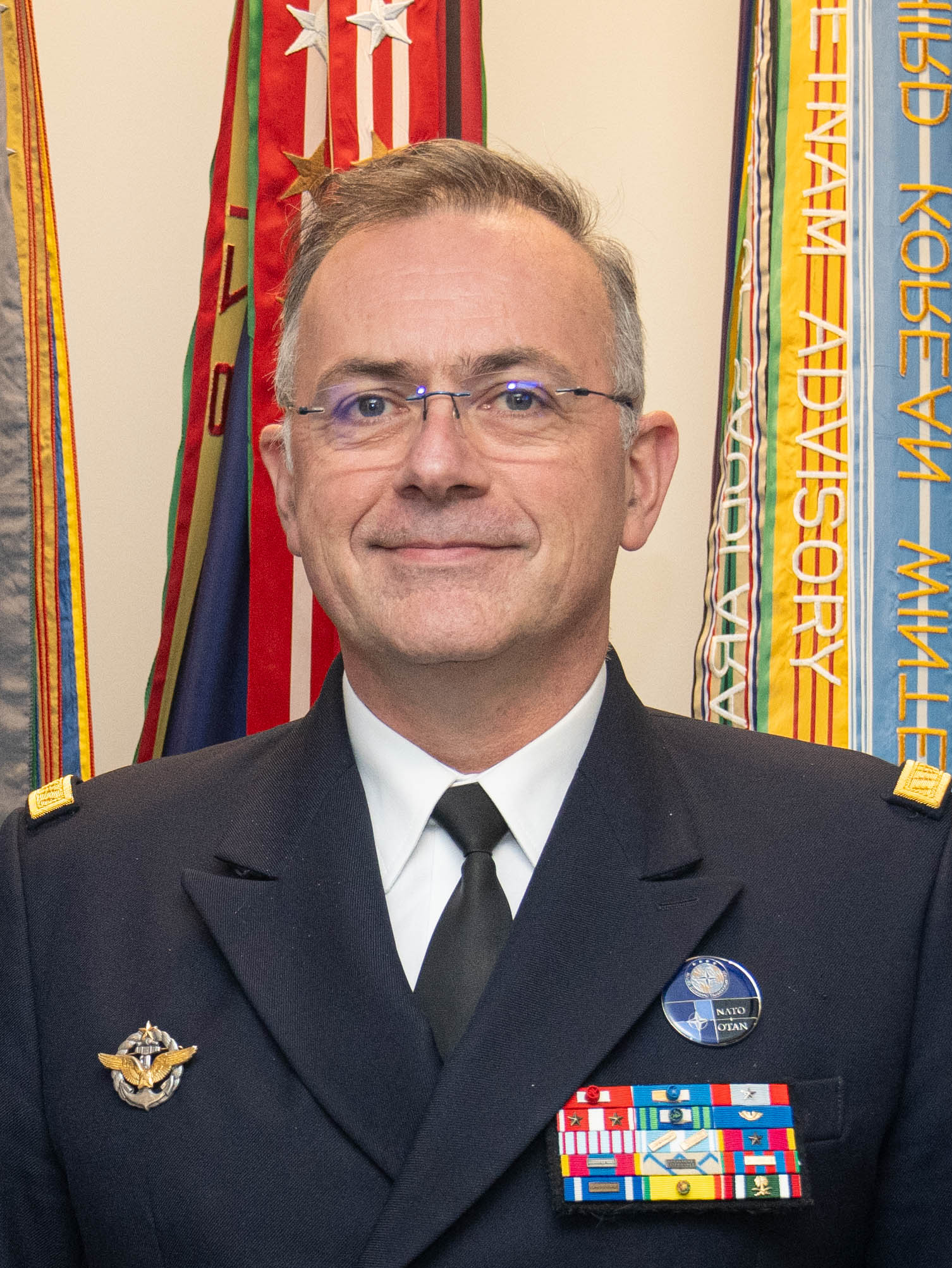
- Admiral Vandier in 2024
- Born: Pierre Dominique André Vandier; 26 October 1967 (age 58); Toulon, France
- Allegiance: France
- Branch: French Navy
- Service years: 1989–present
- Rank: Admiral
- Commands: Supreme Allied Commander Transformation; Chief of Staff of the French Navy; Charles de Gaulle; Surcouf
- Conflicts: Gulf War; Bosnian War; Kosovo War
- Alma mater: École navale École militaire

Pierre Dominique André Vandier (French pronunciation: [pjɛʁ vɑ̃dje]; born 26 October 1967) is a French admiral who serves as Supreme Allied Commander Transformation since 2024. He served as the Chief of the Naval Staff from 1 September 2020 to 31 August 2023, after having been head of the military cabinet of the Minister of the Armed Forces from 1 September 2018 to 31 August 2020, and commanding officer of the aircraft carrier Charles de Gaulle from 2013 to 2015.

== Biography ==
=== Early life and education ===
Pierre Vandier’s great-grandfather, Benjamin Vandier (1835-1878), was a naval officer, member of parliament and finally senator for Vendée. His great-uncle, also named Pierre Vandier (1873-1922), was also a naval officer. His father was a general officer in the supply corps of the French Navy.

In 1987, Pierre Vandier was awarded first place in the competitive exam for entry into the French Naval Academy (French: École navale), and he graduated in first place in 1989. He completed his application training onboard helicopter carrier Jeanne d’Arc during the first Gulf War.

=== Military career ===
At the end of the Jeanne d’Arc application campaign, he was assigned to the frigate Commandant Bory, involved in the operations of the first Gulf War in 1991 (Operation Artimon and support for Operation Daguet). From the summer of 1992, he trained as a fighter pilot in Salon de Provence, in Tours and then in Hyères, and joined the Landivisiau fighter squadrons on Super-Etendard fighter aircraft (squadron 17F, then 11F). He carried out several combat missions in Bosnia (1995/1997 – Operation Salamandre) and in Kosovo (1999 – Operation Trident). Transferred to Rafale aircraft in 2001, he assumed command of the 12F squadron, which was the first squadron of Rafale Marine aircraft, from 2002 to 2004. He completed the military testing of this new carrier-based fighter jet to prepare for its commissioning and carried out several missions in Afghanistan during Mission Agapanthe in 2004.

After completing his studies with the 12th class of the Joint College of Defence (French: Collège Interarmées de Défense), he held the position of head of the operations department of aircraft carrier Charles de Gaulle from 2005 to 2007. During this time, the air wing aircraft were again employed in Afghanistan in support of the troops of the ISAF (International Security Assistance Force, under the command of NATO). In the summer of 2007, he took command of frigate Surcouf and took part in Operation Thalatine to rescue hostages aboard the sailing yacht Ponant in the Indian Ocean.

After obtaining the atomic engineering certificate in early 2009, he took up the post of programme management officer in the “Plans” division of the Defence Staff (French: Etat-Major des Armées, acronym: EMA). He was responsible for the Rafale programme and the NH90 and Tiger helicopter programmes in particular. In the summer of 2011, he took up the position of head of operations for the Africa area (J3) at the planning and operations management centre (French: Centre de Planification et de Conduite des Opérations, acronym: CPCO) at the Defence Staff. He was head of the crisis unit for Operation Serval in Mali from January to July 2013.

At the end of July 2013, he assumed command of aircraft carrier Charles de Gaulle. He was deployed to the Indian Ocean twice, in the winter of 2013 to carry out Mission Bois-Belleau, and in the spring of 2015 for Mission Arromanches, during which he took part in Operation Chammal in Iraq. In January 2017, he took up the post of International Relations Coordination Authority (ALRI) at the Naval Staff and was promoted to commodore on 1 September 2017. He was then appointed deputy commander of the arrondissement maritime (effectively maritime district) of the Mediterranean and commander of the Toulon defence base. Appointed Chief of the Military Cabinet of the Minister of the Armed Forces on 1 September 2018, he was then elevated to the rank and title of vice admiral on 1 January 2020. Appointed Chief of the Naval Staff, he was elevated to the rank and title of admiral on 1 September 2020.

He is an auditor of the 65th session of the Centre for Advanced Military Studies (French: Centre des Hautes Etudes Militaires, acronym: CHEM) and of the 68th session of the Institute for Advanced Studies in National Defence (French: Institut des Hautes Etudes de la Défense Nationale, acronym: IHEDN). Admiral Vandier is married with six children.

=== Chief of the Naval Staff ===
At the beginning of 2020, his name was mentioned to succeed Admiral Christophe Prazuck as chief of the Naval Staff or Admiral Bernard Rogel as chief of the personal military staff of the President of the Republic. He was appointed Chief of the Naval Staff during the Council of Ministers of 22 July 2022, starting the following 12 September.

His predecessor, Admiral Christophe Prazuck, gave him the Admiralty mark during a ceremony onboard aircraft carrier Charles de Gaulle on 1 September 2020.

In January 2021, he presented the “Mercator acceleration” plan. Launched in 2018 by his predecessor, the Mercator plan aims to define the objectives to be achieved by the French Navy in 2030 and is structured around three dimensions: Combat Navy, Cutting-Edge Navy and All-Talent Navy. In 2021, Admiral Vandier made the following observation: since the publication of the Mercator plan in 2018, geopolitical tensions have increased. The pace of strategic change has increased. The race of the world has accelerated, and the oceans are experiencing a naval rearmament unprecedented for several decades. In this uncertain international context, while guaranteeing the permanent posture of nuclear deterrence and the daily use of our resources within the framework of the action of the State at sea, the Chief of the Defence Staff must be able to employ a Navy prepared for high-intensity combat that could occur in shared areas, and at sea in particular.

In June 2021, Admiral Vandier also took over the presidency of the Indian Ocean Naval Symposium (IONS), during a symposium in Reunion.

The IONS was created in 2008 with the aim of promoting cooperation between the military navies of the states bordering the Indian Ocean and consolidating a common approach to the challenges and responses related to the issues of the area. This body is the privileged forum for exchange between these 25 nations, to which are added eight observer States and eight States invited by France during this edition.

The presidency of the IONS is assumed in turn by a permanent member: the transfer of presidency is the subject of a symposium, during which the permanent working groups present the progress of their work, and the chiefs of staff of the member navies can meet to provide direction.

As a neighbouring nation of the Indian Ocean, France is by right a member of IONS since 2014, and takes over the presidency for a period of two years.

=== NATO ===
On 23 September 2024 he took over as Supreme Allied Commander Transformation at HQ SACT in Norfolk, Virginia.

On 22 March 2026, he led a NATO military command delegation on a visit to Ukraine for the first time since the start of the Russo-Ukrainian war.

== Publications ==
- La Dissuasion au troisième âge nucléaire, Monaco, éditions du Rocher, 2018, 105 p. (ISBN 978-2-268-09788-6).

== Dates of rank ==
- 1 November 1999: Lieutenant commander (NATO code: OF-3).
- 1 November 2003: Commander (NATO code: OF-4).
- 1 November 2008: Captain (NATO code: OF-5).
- 1 September 2017: Commodore (NATO code: OF-6).
- 1 January 2020: Vice admiral (NATO code: OF-8).
  - Promoted to rear admiral (NATO code : OF-7) on 1 January 2020, Pierre Vandier was directly elevated to the rank and designation of vice admiral; therefore he never wore the three stars of a French rear admiral.
- 1 September 2020: Admiral (NATO code: OF-9).

== Awards and decorations ==
| noborder |

- Naval Aviator badge (French: Insigne de pilote de l'Aéronavale).
- Commander of the National Order of the Legion of Honour (French: Ordre national de la Légion d'honneur), 2021 (knight in 2003, officer in 2012, commander in 2021)
- Grand Officer of the National Order of Merit (French: Ordre national du Mérite), 2024
- War Cross for Foreign Operational Theatres (French: Croix de guerre des Théâtres d'opérations extérieurs)
- Cross for Military Valour (French: Croix de la Valeur militaire)
- Commander of the Order of Maritime Merit (French: Ordre du Mérite maritime), 2022 (officer in 2015)
- Aeronautical Medal (French: Médaille de l'Aéronautique)
- Combatant's Cross (French: Croix du combattant)
- Overseas Medal (French: Médaille d'Outre-mer)
- National Defence Medal (French: Médaille de la Défense nationale), Gold
- Medal of the Nation's Gratitude (French: Médaille de reconnaissance de la Nation)
- French commemorative medal (French: Médaille commémorative française)
- NATO Medal (French: Médaille de l'OTAN)
- Saudi commemorative medal (French: Médaille commémorative saoudienne)
- NATO Non-Article 5 medal for the ISAF (French: Médaille de l'OTAN Non-Article 5 pour la Force internationale d'assistance et de sécurité)
- Officer of the National Order of Mali (French: Officier de l'ordre national du Mali)
- Kuwait Liberation Medal of Saudi Arabia (French: Médaille de libération du Koweït).
- Grand Cross of Naval Merit with White Decoration (Spain, 2026)

Military offices
| Preceded by Christophe Prazuck | Chief of Staff of the French Navy; 2020–2023 | Succeeded by Nicolas Vaujour |
| Preceded by Philippe Lavigne | Supreme Allied Commander Transformation; 2024–present | Vacant |
