= Allied Command Transformation =

NATO strategic-level military command

Coordinates: 50°29′58″N 3°59′02″E

Allied Command Transformation: ACT; CAT
- Emblem
- Founded: 19 June 2003; 23 years ago
- Part of: (NATO) North Atlantic Treaty Organization
- Headquarters: Naval Support Activity Hampton Roads, Norfolk, Virginia, US
- Website: www.act.nato.int

Commanders
- Supreme Allied Commander Transformation: Admiral Pierre Vandier French Navy, since 23 September 2024

The Allied Command Transformation (abbr. ACT; French: Commandement allié Transformation) (Note: "English and French shall be the official languages for the entire North Atlantic Treaty Organization." "...the English and French texts [of the Treaty] are equally authentic...") is a military command of the North Atlantic Treaty Organization (NATO), formed in 2003 after restructuring.

It was intended to lead military transformation of alliance forces and capabilities, using new concepts such as the NATO Response Force and new doctrines in order to improve the alliance's military effectiveness. When France rejoined the NATO Military Command Structure in mid-2009, a significant change took place where the Supreme Allied Commander Transformation (SACT) became a French officer. The first French officer to serve as SACT was French Air Force General Stephane Abrial (2009–2012).

ACT is organized around four principal functions: Strategic thinking; Development of capabilities; Education, training and exercises; and Co-operation and engagement. These functions are reflected in the composition of Allied Command Transformation which has its Headquarters in Norfolk, Virginia and three subordinate entities in Norway (JWC), in Poland (JFTC) and in Portugal (JALLS).

Allied Command Transformation's current mission is to:

- provide the conceptual framework for the conduct of future combined joint operations;
- define how future operations will be conducted and what capabilities they will need;
- take new operational concepts, from others or self-generated, assess their viability and value, and bring them to maturity through doctrine development, scientific research, experimentation and technological development;
- implement both by persuading nations, individually and collectively, to acquire the capability, and provide the education and training, enabling concepts to be implemented by NATO forces.

A large number of conferences and seminars have been organised by the command in fulfilment of its conceptual development mission. These have included CD&E, a national Chiefs of Transformation conference, an examination of the Global Commons, Law of Armed Conflict, and a Multiple Futures project.

== History ==
=== Allied Command Atlantic 1952 to 2003 ===
Allied Command Transformation was preceded by Allied Command Atlantic (ACLANT) established in 1952 under the overall command of Supreme Allied Commander Atlantic (SACLANT), with its headquarters at Norfolk, Virginia. ACLANT's purpose was to guard the sea lines of communication between North America and Europe in order to reinforce the European countries of NATO with U.S. troops and supplies in the event of a Soviet/Warsaw Pact invasion of Western Europe. Following the end of the Cold War, the Command was reduced, with many of its subordinate headquarters spread across the Atlantic area losing their NATO status and funding. However, the basic structure remained in place until the Prague Summit in the Czech Republic in 2002. This led to ACLANT being decommissioned effective 19 June 2003, and a new Allied Command Transformation being established as its successor.

Admiral Edmund P. Giambastiani Jr. US Navy became the last SACLANT on 2 October 2002. He served as ACLANT commander until 19 Jun 2003. He then served as Supreme Allied Commander, Transformation, until 1 Aug 2005. Admiral Sir Mark Stanhope RN, the Deputy Supreme Allied Commander, then served as Acting Supreme Allied Commander until the arrival of General Lance L. Smith USAF in November 2005.

=== After the Cold War ===
At the 2002 Prague Summit, it was decided that NATO should change its military structures and concepts, and acquire new types of equipment to face the operational challenges of coalition warfare against the threats of the new century. Thus NATO's military command structure was reorganized. One strategic command, Allied Command Transformation, was focused on transforming NATO, while the other strategic command focused on NATO's operations, Allied Command Operations. Initial reports about a NATO transformation command began to appear in July 2002. ACT was formally established on June 19, 2003.

A suite of "Baseline for Rapid Iterative Transformational Experimentation" (BRITE) software was designed in response to the Maritime Situational Awareness request. This request, a product of a U.S. international and inter-agency initiatives termed "Maritime Domain Awareness", serves to counter threats to the maritime commons including terrorism, human/drug smuggling, piracy, and espionage.

Since Allied Command Atlantic became Allied Command Transformation, commanders have included non-naval officers. Gen. Lance L. Smith USAF commanded ACT from 10 Nov 2005 until 9 Nov 2007. He was succeeded by Gen. James N. Mattis USMC, who served from 9 Nov 2007 - 08 Sep 2009. A significant change was the assumption of command by a French officer, after France rejoined the NATO Command Structure in mid-2009. General Stéphane Abrial, former chief of the French Air Force assumed command in 2009. French Air Force General Jean-Paul Paloméros replaced Abrial at the end of September 2012. On 30 September 2015 French Air Force General Denis Mercier succeeded General Paloméros, in September 2018 General André Lanata succeeded General Mercier, and in 2021 General Philippe Lavigne succeeded General Lanata.

The Deputy Supreme Allied Commander Transformation position is currently filled by General Chris Badia of the German Air Force. He succeeded General Paolo Ruggiero, Italian Army, who succeeded Admiral Manfred Nielson, German Navy, who succeeded General Mirco Zuliani of the Italian Air Force, General Mieczysław Bieniek of the Polish Land Forces, Admiral Luciano Zappata (Italian Navy) and Admiral Stanhope. For several years, in a carryover from SACLANT, the Deputy's position was filled by a Royal Navy admiral. Stanhope's succession by Zappata meant an end to this practice.

=== After the Russian invasion of Ukraine (2022) ===
The renewed, full-scale Russian invasion of Ukraine (2022) brought significant changes for ACT. The Joint Analysis and Lessons Learned Centre launched the JALLC-UKR Initiative in 2024. It was focused on the Russian invasion of Ukraine (2022). JALLC-UKR Initiative Information Centre on the NATO Lessons Learned Portal, in September 2024, published a report Two Years of NATO Lessons Relating to Russia's War Against Ukraine, presenting findings from analyses between March 2022 and March 2024. The report covers command and control, joint effects, and cooperation with organizations, and it highlights the dual nature of lessons learned, including new technologies and conventional warfare aspects. It emphasizes the need for NATO to develop new technologies while maintaining traditional methods.

From July 11, 2024, after approval at the NATO-Ukraine Council on 15 February 2024, the Joint Analysis, Training and Education Centre (JATEC) was established in Bydgoszcz in Poland, collocated with the Joint Force Training Centre at Poniatowski Barracks. It became a fourth joint centre, part of ACT. It was intended to serve as a knowledge repository. Application of lessons from Russo-Ukrainian War for strategy, policy, doctrine, tactics and operations and to contribute to Joint tactical level training of NATO and partner forces The JATEC Commander became Polish Brigadier General Wojciech Ozga. With 33 personnel (IOC), It was expected to grow to about 74 personnel, incl. 20 Ukrainians.

The JATEC was:

- activated on 16 December 2024 by order of the North Atlantic Council
- was expected to attain initial operational capability on 17 February 2025;
- and to attain full operational capability in February 2026

The 25 April 2025 Senior Advisory Board Kyiv meeting included discussion of:

- Integration of Ukrainian and NATO efforts at JATEC
- Building resilience in defense digital infrastructure and critical systems
- Strengthening military education and interoperability programs
- Fast-tracking innovation against current battlefield threats (notably fiber-optic drones and precision-guided munitions).

== Structure ==
The command's headquarters is in Norfolk, Virginia, in the United States. HQ SACT itself is organised into a command group, the Transformation Directorate, the Transformation Support Directorate, National Liaison Representatives, the Partnership for Peace Staff Element and Reservists responsible to HQ SACT.

The Transformation Directorate is headed by the Deputy Chief of Staff (DCOS) Transformation who acts as the Supreme Allied Commander, Transformation's (SACT) Director for guidance and coordination of the activities of their Directorate Transformation, divided in two divisions: Implementation and Capabilities. Within the full scale of SACT's transformational responsibilities the Deputy Chief of Staff (DCOS) Transformation assists the Chief of Staff (COS) in the execution of his or her duties with emphasis on deliverables to the Alliance Military Transformation Process in order to enhance NATO's operational capabilities and to meet NATO's future requirements.

The Implementation Division, led by Assistant Chief of Staff (ACOS) Implementation, is responsible for guidance and coordination of the activities of two Sub-Divisions, Joint Education and Training (JET) and Joint Experimentation, Exercises and Assessment (JEEA), as well as providing guidance for the Joint Warfare Centre (JWC) and Joint Analysis Lessons Learned Centre (JALLC), in their efforts to enhance training programs, to carry out concept development and experimentation, to press on common standards, and to develop effective programs to capture and implement lessons learned. This division probably^{is there some doubt?} serves as NATO's linkpoint to the annual U.S.-led Coalition Warrior Interoperability Demonstration.

The Capabilities Division, led by Assistant Chief of Staff (ACOS) Capabilities, is responsible for guidance and coordination of the activities of three Sub-Divisions: of Strategic Concepts, Policy and Interoperability (SCPI); Future Capabilities, Research and Technology (FCRT) and Defence Planning (Def Plan) in their efforts to staff Capabilities, Concepts and Development products.

=== Subordinate commands ===
Reflecting NATO as a whole, ACT has a presence on both sides of the Atlantic. Before the deactivation of United States Joint Forces Command, the two organisations were co-located, and indeed shared a commander for some time. There is an ACT command element located at SHAPE in Mons, Belgium. ACT's major subordinate commands are the Joint Warfare Centre (JWC) in Stavanger, Norway; the Joint Force Training Centre (JFTC) in Bydgoszcz, Poland; and the Joint Analysis and Lessons Learned Centre (JALLC) in Monsanto, Portugal. Under a customer-funded arrangement, ACT invests about 30 million Euros into research with the NATO Communications and Information Agency (NCIA) each year to support scientific and experimental programs.

The Joint Analysis, Training and Education Centre was added after the full-scale Russian invasion of Ukraine (2022) began.

=== NATO Centres of Excellence ===
A Centre of Excellence (COE) offers recognized expertise and experience to the benefit of the Alliance, especially in support of transformation. Most are single-nation sponsored, but some are sponsored by multiple members. It provides opportunities to enhance education and training, to improve interoperability and capabilities, to assist in doctrine development and/or to test and validate concepts through experimentation. A COE is not a part of the NATO Military Command Structure, but their activities with NATO are coordinated through Headquarters SACT. Since COEs are predominantly multinational entities, most COEs are overseen by a steering committee (SC), that sets the programme of work and approves the budget for the COE.

Principles:

- No duplication or competition with existing NATO capabilities
- Nationally funded
- Conforms to NATO procedures, doctrines, standards and security policies
- Coordinated Programmes of Work provide guidance with inputs from both ACT and ACO organisations

NATO has the following accredited COEs:

- Air Operations Centre of Excellence - also known as the Centre for Analysis and Simulation of Air Operations (CASPOA COE) in Lyon, France
- Civil-Military Cooperation Centre of Excellence (CIMIC COE) in The Hague, Netherlands
- Climate Change and Security COE, Montreal, Canada
- Cold Weather Operations Centre of Excellence (COE CWO) in Elverum, Norway
- Combined Joint Operations from the Sea Center of Excellence (CJOS-COE) in Norfolk, Virginia, United States
- Command & Control Centre of Excellence (C2 COE) in Utrecht, Netherlands
- Cooperative Cyber Defence Centre of Excellence (CCD COE) in Tallinn, Estonia
- Counter Improvised Explosive Devices Centre of Excellence (C-IED COE) in Madrid, Spain
- Counter Intelligence Centre of Excellence (CI COE) in Kraków, Poland
- (France) Crisis Management for Disaster Response Centre of Excellence (CMDR COE) in Sofia, Bulgaria
- Defence Against Terrorism Centre of Excellence (DAT COE) in Ankara, Turkey
- Energy Security Centre of Excellence (ENSEC COE) in Vilnius, Lithuania
- Explosive Ordnance Disposal Centre of Excellence (EOD COE) in Trenčín, Slovakia
- Human Intelligence Centre of Excellence (HUMINT COE) in Oradea, Romania
- Integrated Air & Missile Defence Centre of Excellence (IAMD COE) in Crete, Greece
- Joint Air Power Competence Center (JAPCC) in Kalkar, Germany
- Joint Chemical, Biological, Radiation, & Nuclear Defence Centre of Excellence (JCBRN Defence COE) in Vyškov, Czech Republic
- Maritime Geospatial, Meteorological & Oceanographic Centre of Excellence (MGEOMETOC COE) in Lisbon, Portugal
- Maritime Security Centre of Excellence (MARSEC COE) in Istanbul, Turkey
- Military Engineering Centre of Excellence (MILENG COE) in Ingolstadt, Germany
- Military Medical Centre of Excellence (MILMED COE) in Budapest, Hungary
- Military Police Centre of Excellence (MP COE) in Bydgoszcz, Poland
- Modelling and Simulation Centre of Excellence (M&S COE) in Rome, Italy
- Mountain Warfare Centre of Excellence (MW COE) in Begunje na Gorenjskem, Slovenia
- Naval Mine Warfare Centre of Excellence (NMW COE) in Ostend, Belgium
- Operations in Confined and Shallow Waters Centre of Excellence (CSW COE) in Kiel, Germany
- Security Force Assistance Centre of Excellence (SFA COE) in Rome, Italy
- Space Centre of Excellence (Space COE) in Toulouse, France
- Stability Policing Centre of Excellence (SP COE) in Vicenza, Italy
- Strategic Communications Centre of Excellence (STRATCOM COE) in Riga, Latvia

== Leadership ==
=== Supreme Allied Commander Transformation ===
No.	Portrait	Supreme Allied Commander	Took office	Left office	Time in office	Defence branch
1	Edmund Giambastiani	Admiral; Edmund Giambastiani (born 1948)	19 June 2003	19 June 2005	2 years, 0 days	United States Navy
2	Lance L. Smith	General; Lance L. Smith (born 1946)	10 November 2005	9 November 2007	1 year, 364 days	United States Air Force
3	James Mattis	General; James Mattis (born 1950)	9 November 2007	9 September 2009	1 year, 304 days	United States Marine Corps
4	Stéphane Abrial	Général d'armée aérienne Stéphane Abrial (born 1954)	9 September 2009	28 September 2012	3 years, 19 days	French Air Force
5	Jean-Paul Paloméros	Général d'armée aérienne Jean-Paul Paloméros (born 1953)	28 September 2012	30 September 2015	3 years, 2 days	French Air Force
6	Denis Mercier	Général d'armée aérienne Denis Mercier (born 1959)	30 September 2015	11 September 2018	2 years, 346 days	French Air Force
7	André Lanata	Général d'armée aérienne André Lanata (born 1961)	11 September 2018	23 September 2021	3 years, 12 days	French Air and Space Force
8	Philippe Lavigne	Général d'armée aérienne Philippe Lavigne (born 1965)	23 September 2021	23 September 2024	3 years, 0 days	French Air and Space Force
9	Pierre Vandier	Amiral; Pierre Vandier (born 1967)	23 September 2024	Present	2 years, 53 days	French Navy

=== Deputy Supreme Allied Commander Transformation ===
No.	Name	Picture	Began office	End office	Defence branch
1	Admiral Sir Ian Forbes (born 1946)		1 July 2003	10 July 2004	Royal Navy
2	Admiral Sir Mark Stanhope (born 1952)		10 July 2004	3 July 2007	Royal Navy
3	Admiral Luciano Zappata		3 July 2007	29 September 2010	(Italy) Italian Navy
4	General Mieczysław Bieniek (born 1951)		29 September 2010	3 September 2013	(Poland) Polish Land Forces
5	General Mirco Zuliani (born 1953)		3 September 2013	24 March 2016	(Italy) Italian Air Force
6	Admiral Manfred Nielson (born 1955)		24 March 2016	19 July 2019	(Germany) German Navy
7	General Paolo Ruggiero (born 1957)		19 July 2019	7 July 2022	(Italy) Italian Army
8	General Christian Badia (born 1963)	General Chris Badia	7 July 2022	11 July 2025	(Germany) German Air Force
9	General Aurelio Colagrande		11 July 2025		(Italy) Italian Air Force
