= Military Engineering Centre of Excellence =

NATO Military Engineering Centre of Excellence
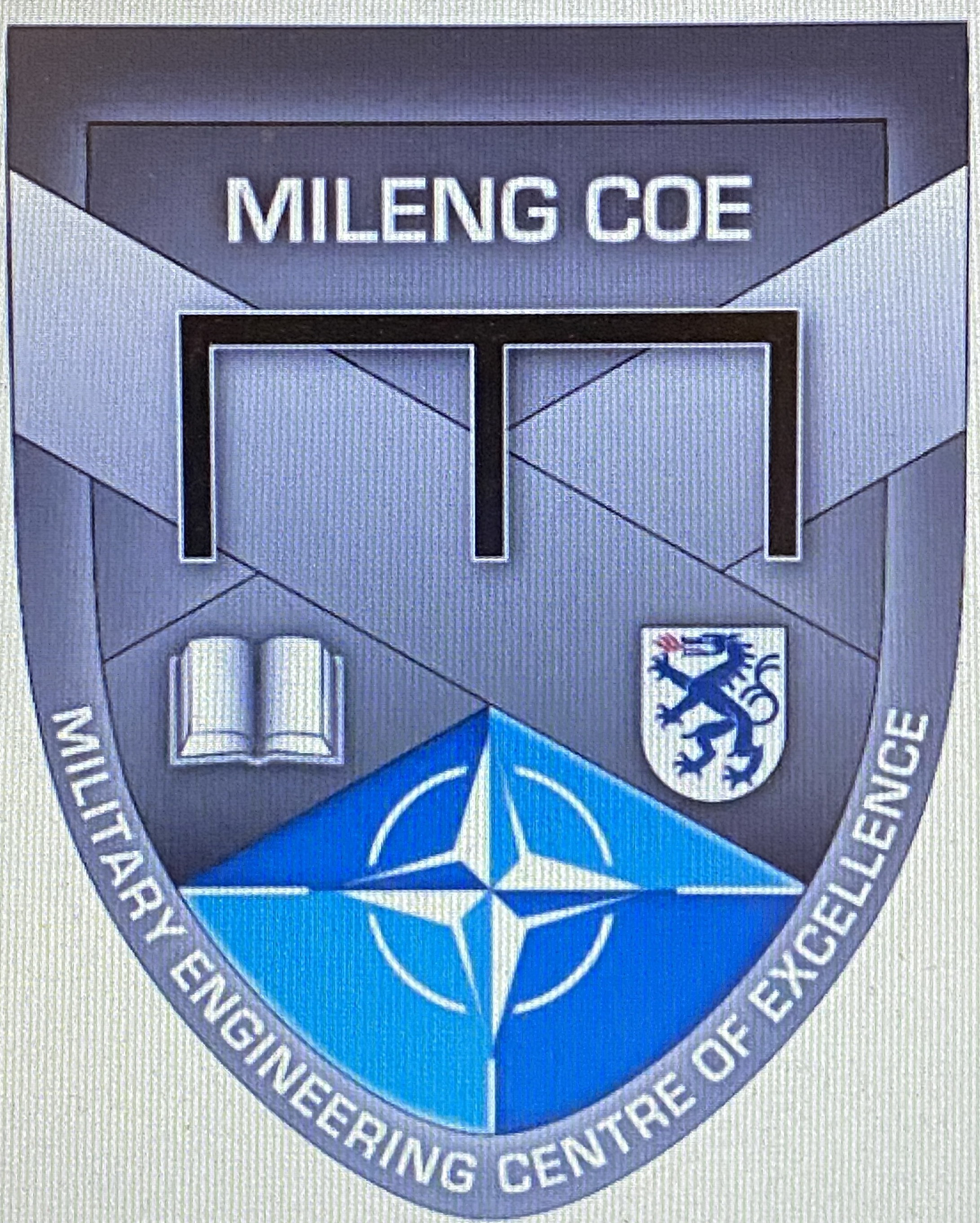
- Active: 27 March 2009 - present
- Allegiance: NATO
- Type: NATO COE
- Role: Transformation of NATO
- Size: 37
- Garrison/HQ: Ingolstadt, Germany
- Motto: Interoperability is a Question of Attitude
- Website: www.milengcoe.org

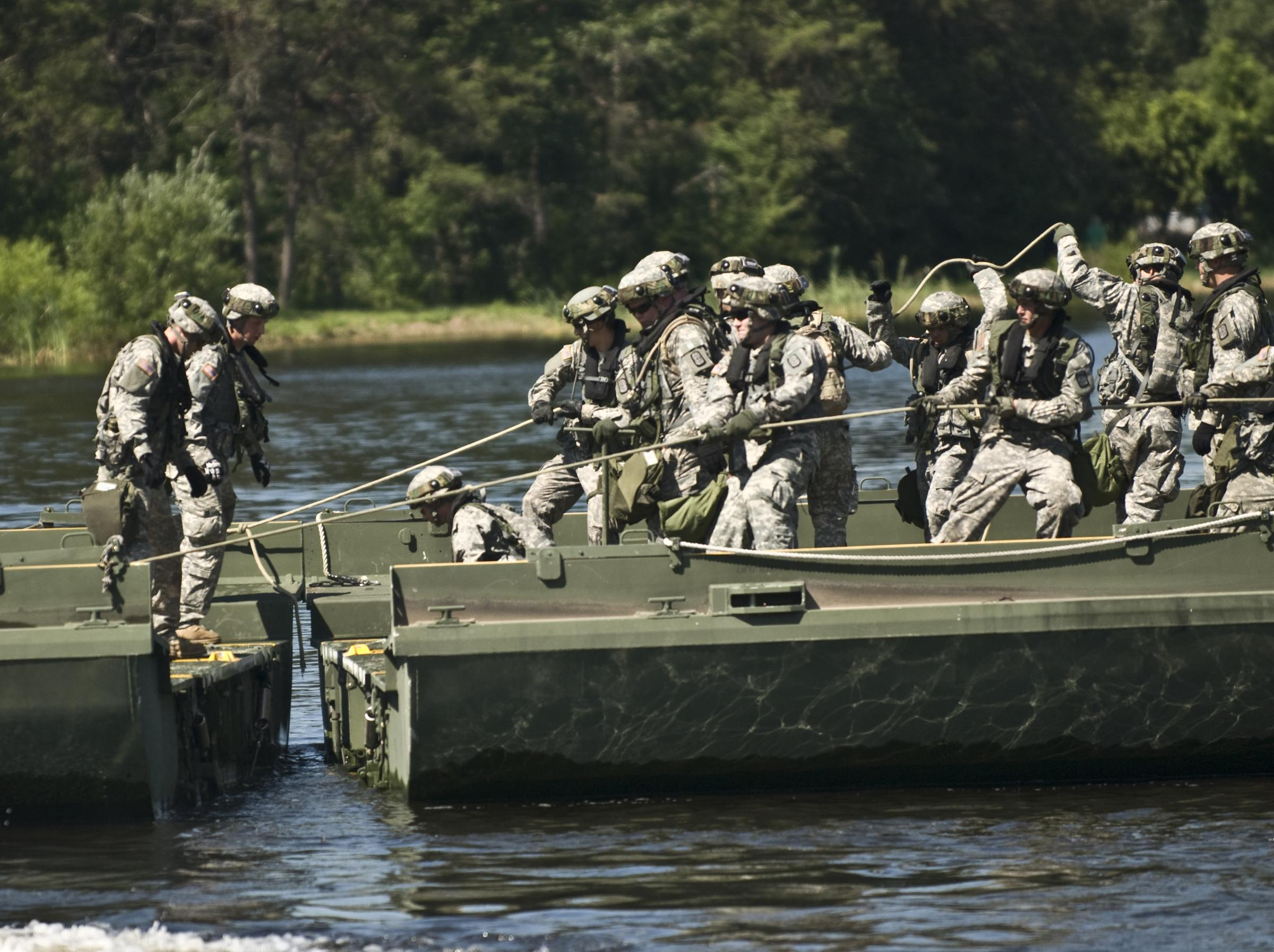
The American 341st Engineer Company building a ribbon bridge

The NATO Military Engineering Centre of Excellence (MILENG COE) is an International Military Organization (IMO) as designated by the Paris Protocol of 28 August 1952. The organization is a part of the NATO Centre of Excellence. Sponsored by fifteen NATO Member States and - since 2026 - Switzerland as NATO Partner Nation, the MILENG COE belongs to a wider framework that supports NATO’s transformation process. The organization's objective is to assist NATO member countries, non-member countries, and international organizations in enhancing military engineering capabilities. MILENG COE is co-located in the German Army Military Engineer School in Ingolstadt, Germany.

Before becoming a NATO Centre of Excellence, the institute was known as the Euro NATO Training Engineer Centre (ENTEC) and was located in Munich. As ENTEC, the institute was mandated to conduct military engineer training for participating nations.

== NATO-COE program ==
A NATO-accredited Centre of Excellence (CoE) is a multi-nationally or nationally established and sponsored entity, which offers recognized expertise and experience within a defined subject matter area to the benefit of the Alliance within the four pillars of NATO's CoE program. A CoE is not a part of the NATO Command Structure (NCS) or of other NATO entities, but forms part of the wider framework that contributes to the functioning of the Alliance. Although not part of the NATO command structure, they are part of a wider framework supporting NATO Command Arrangements. Designed to complement the Alliance’s current resources, Centres of Excellence cover a wide variety of areas, with each one focusing on a specific field of expertise to enhance NATO capabilities. The overall responsibility for Centres of Excellence coordination and utilization within NATO lies with Allied Command Transformation, in co-ordination with the Supreme Allied Commander Europe.

== Mission and task ==
MilEng CoE provides NATO and its partners a military engineering knowledge hub through education & training, subject matter expertise and development of policy, concepts and doctrine to enhance the effective interoperability of military engineering capabilities into NATO operations and exercises. We are committed to building and maintaining a network of partners, experts, and stakeholders in military engineering in support of the Alliance's strategic objectives.

The Centre's work is usually initiated by a "Request for Support" by a NATO entity or participating nation. Additionally, there is an annual Program of Work which contains long term projects with a certain product and deadline, as well as activities to actively support NATO transformation. The MILENG COE also plans and conducts conferences and worksites for military engineers.

The Centre brings together experts in the areas of general military engineering, explosive ordnance disposal, environmental protection, and infrastructure management.

== Current status ==
Currently, 16 Sponsoring Nations (15 NATO Nations and one NATO Partner Nation) have joined the Centre:

- Belgium
- Canada
- Czech Republic
- Denmark
- Germany
- Greece
- Hungary
- Italy
- Netherlands
- Norway
- Poland
- Romania
- Switzerland
- Turkey
- United States
- United Kingdom

== See also ==
- Allied Command Transformation
