= Joint Force Training Centre =

NATO headquarters in Bydgoszcz, Poland

- Coat of arms
- Founded: 31 March 2004
- Type: Military education and training
- Role: Executing joint tactical level training for NATO and Partner forces
- Part of: Allied Command Transformation
- Headquarters: Poniatowski Barracks, Bydgoszcz, Poland
- Website: www.jftc.nato.int

Commanders
- Current commander: Major General Bogdan Rycerski
- Deputy Commander, Chief of Staff: BRG Zoltan Barany, Hungarian Ground Forces

The Joint Force Training Centre (JFTC) is a NATO headquarters located in Bydgoszcz, Poland, responsible to Allied Command Transformation at Norfolk, Virginia, in the United States.

== History ==
The Joint Force Training Centre, which started on March 31, 2004, focuses on joint and combined training at the tactical level. In particular, it focuses on the conduct of joint tactical training to achieve joint tactical interoperability at the key tactical interfaces. It reached full operational capability on June 30, 2006.

It cooperates with other national training centres, including Partnership for Peace training centres and the Centre of Excellence. As a priority, the JFTC provides support to the NATO Response Force (NRF) joint and component commanders in the training and exercising of the NRF, focusing on joint and combined competences.

== Location ==
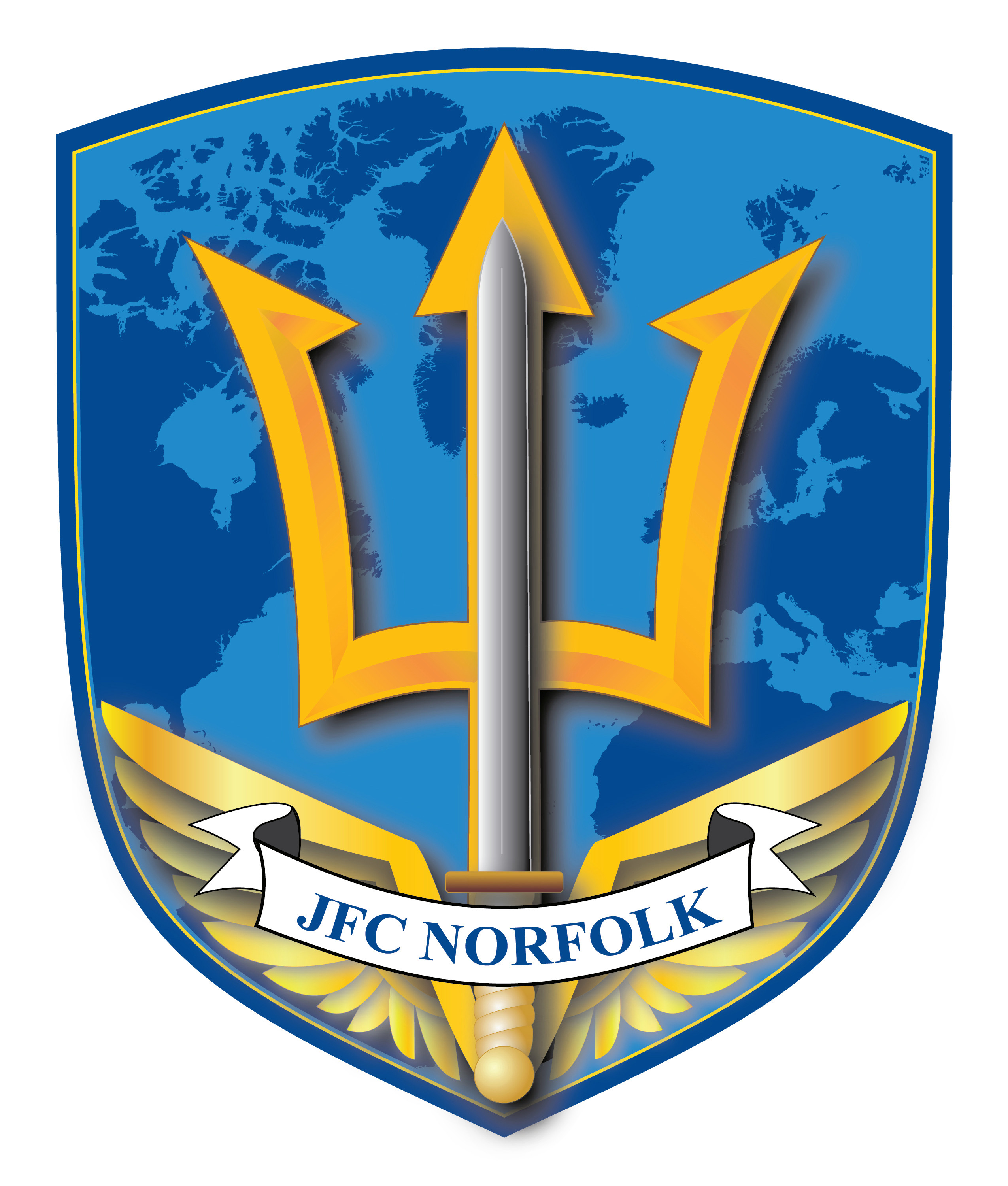
POLITICAL-STRATEGIC LEVEL:	North Atlantic Council (NAC); NATO Headquarters, Brussels, BEL
Secretary-General (SECGEN); NATO Headquarters, Brussels, BEL	International Staff (IS); NATO Headquarters, Brussels, BEL
MILITARY-STRATEGIC LEVEL:
International Military Staff (IMS); NATO Headquarters, Brussels, BEL	Military Committee (MC); NATO Headquarters, Brussels, BEL
STRATEGIC COMMANDS:
Supreme Allied Commander Transformation; Allied Command Transformation (ACT); Norfolk, U.S.	Supreme Allied Commander Europe; Allied Command Operations (ACO); Mons, BEL
TRANSFORMATION COMMANDS:	OPERATIONAL COMMANDS:
Joint Warfare Centre (JWC); Stavanger, NOR	Joint Force Command Brunssum (JFC Brunssum); Brunssum, NLD	Allied Air Command (AIRCOM); Ramstein, DEU
Joint Force Training Centre (JFTC); Bydgoszcz, POL	Joint Force Command Naples (JFC Naples); Naples, ITA	Allied Land Command (LANDCOM); İzmir, TUR
Joint Analysis and Lessons Learned Centre (JALLC); Lisbon, PRT	Joint Force Command Norfolk (JFC Norfolk); Norfolk, Virginia, U.S.	Allied Maritime Command (MARCOM); Northwood, GBR
Joint Support and Enabling Command (JSEC); Ulm, DEU

In October 2008, JFTC relocated from its home on ul. gen.Józefa Dwernickiego (Gen. Józef Dwernicki Street) to a new simulations centre on ul. Szubińska (Szubińska Street).

Locations of NATO's two strategic commands — Allied Command Transformation (ACT) with its subordinate centres (blue marks) and Allied Command Operations (ACO), headquartered at Supreme Headquarters Allied Powers Europe (SHAPE) and including its subordinate and joint force commands (red marks).

Bydgoszcz, which is already a strategic hub of NATO activities, hosts the NATO Force Integration Unit, NATO Signal Battalion, NATO Military Police Centre of Excellence, NATO Communications and Information Support Centre, and JATEC (Joint Analysis, Training and Education Center – NATO-Ukraine military-civilian working level organization). The International School of Bydgoszcz, where children of NATO officers and employees are educated, is also located in the city.
