= Joint Analysis and Lessons Learned Centre =

NATO military unit

Coordinates: 38.7298572°N 9.1892482°W

- Coat of arms
- Founded: 2 September 2002
- Type: Military education and training
- Role: Collective security
- Part of: Allied Command Transformation
- Headquarters: Lisbon, Portugal
- Motto: NATO's Lead Agent for Lessons Learned
- Website: www.jallc.nato.int

Commanders
- Current commander: (since 16 July 2025) BRG Cristinel- Dumitru Colibaba Romanian Land Forces

The Joint Analysis and Lessons Learned Centre (JALLC) is a NATO body located in Monsanto (Lisbon), Portugal.

Commissioned on 2 September 2002, it serves as NATO’s lead agent for Lessons Learned and joint analysis, operating under Allied Command Transformation (ACT).

Its motto is Analyse | Learn | Improve.

Locations of NATO's two strategic commands — Allied Command Transformation (ACT) with its subordinate centres (blue marks) and Allied Command Operations (ACO), headquartered at Supreme Headquarters Allied Powers Europe (SHAPE) and including its subordinate and joint force commands (red marks).

== History ==
The Joint Analysis and Lessons Learned Centre was commissioned on 2 September 2002. Its mission is to serve as NATO's centre for performing joint analysis of operations, training, exercises and experimentation, including establishing and maintaining an interactive managed NATO Lessons Learned Database. The JALLC is also responsible for producing the NATO Joint Analysis Handbook and the NATO Lessons Learned Handbook, for hosting the NATO Lessons Learned Conference and for organizing the NATO Lessons Learned Staff Officers Course at SWEDINT.

In 2010, the JALLC established the JALLC Advisory and Training Team to assist NATO, NATO/partner nations/organizations to develop or improve their lesson learning and information sharing capability for the mutual benefit of the Alliance. Also, the NATO Lessons Learned Portal was launched to complement the NATO Lessons Learned Database with an area further enabling sharing of lessons learned information.

== Mission ==
The JALLC’s mission is to support Alliance-wide implementation and sustainment of NATO’s Lessons Learned policy by monitoring and supervising the NATO Lessons Learned process across operations, exercises, training and experimentation.

The Centre produces evidence-based analytical outputs to support NATO’s decision-making and transformation processes.

== Structure and Organisation ==
The JALLC is one of three joint organisations within the ACT structure, alongside the Joint Warfare Centre (JWC) in Stavanger, Norway, and the Joint Force Training Centre (JFTC). It reports to SACT (Supreme Allied Commander Transformation).

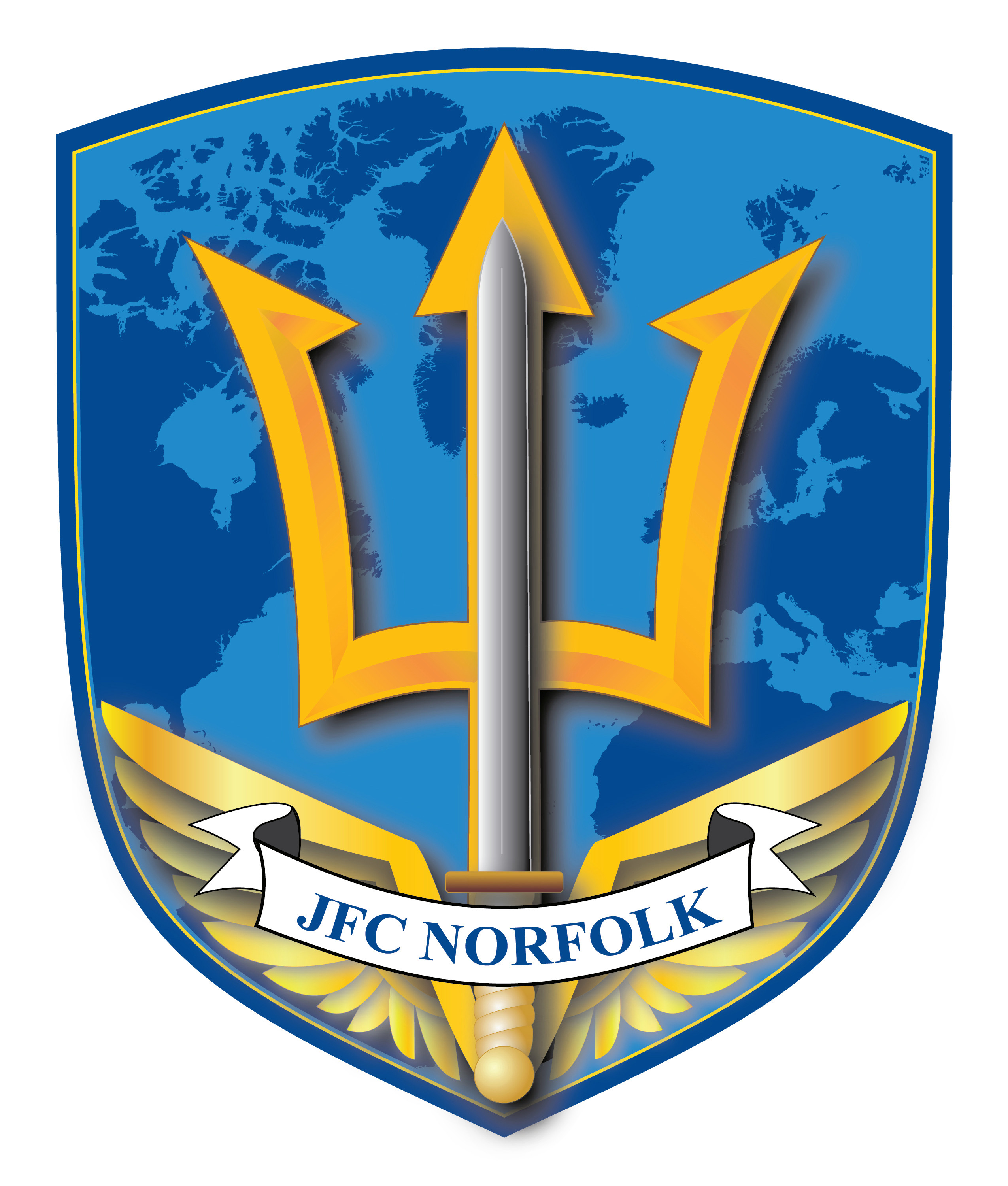
POLITICAL-STRATEGIC LEVEL: | North Atlantic Council (NAC); NATO Headquarters, Brussels, BEL
Secretary-General (SECGEN); NATO Headquarters, Brussels, BEL | International Staff (IS); NATO Headquarters, Brussels, BEL
MILITARY-STRATEGIC LEVEL:
International Military Staff (IMS); NATO Headquarters, Brussels, BEL | Military Committee (MC); NATO Headquarters, Brussels, BEL
STRATEGIC COMMANDS:
Supreme Allied Commander Transformation; Allied Command Transformation (ACT); Norfolk, U.S. | Supreme Allied Commander Europe; Allied Command Operations (ACO); Mons, BEL
TRANSFORMATION COMMANDS: | OPERATIONAL COMMANDS:
Joint Warfare Centre (JWC); Stavanger, NOR | Joint Force Command Brunssum (JFC Brunssum); Brunssum, NLD | Allied Air Command (AIRCOM); Ramstein, DEU
Joint Force Training Centre (JFTC); Bydgoszcz, POL | Joint Force Command Naples (JFC Naples); Naples, ITA | Allied Land Command (LANDCOM); İzmir, TUR
Joint Analysis and Lessons Learned Centre (JALLC); Lisbon, PRT | Joint Force Command Norfolk (JFC Norfolk); Norfolk, Virginia, U.S. | Allied Maritime Command (MARCOM); Northwood, GBR
Joint Support and Enabling Command (JSEC); Ulm, DEU

== Products and Publications ==
The JALLC produces a range of unclassified analytical products:

• Factsheets — concise summaries of analysis projects on specific topics or exercises

• Key Issues and Trends (KIT) reports — thematic analytical reports identifying patterns across multiple operations and exercises

• JALLC Analysis Handbook — the NATO standard for conducting joint analysis, currently in its 4th edition (2024)

• The Explorer — the JALLC’s newsletter, covering analysis topics and centre activities

• NATO Lessons Learned Portal (NLLP) Analysis Newsletters — periodic updates on portal activity and lessons trends

== NATO Lessons Learned Portal (NLLP) ==
Launched to replace the original NATO Lessons Learned Database, the NLLP (https://nllp.jallc.nato.int/) is the Alliance’s central platform for capturing, sharing and implementing lessons.

The JALLC manages and maintains the portal, which is accessible to NATO personnel and partner nations at unclassified and classified levels.

== Location ==
The JALLC is co-located with the Portuguese Air Force Operational Command (Comando Aéreo) at Avenida Tenente Martins, Monsanto, Lisboa, Portugal.
