= Structure of NATO =

The structure of the North Atlantic Treaty Organization (NATO) is complex and multi-faceted. The decision-making body is the North Atlantic Council (NAC), and the member state representatives also sit on the Defence Policy and Planning Committee (DPPC) and the Nuclear Planning Group (NPG). Below that the Secretary General of NATO directs the civilian International Staff, that is divided into administrative divisions, offices and other organizations. Also responsible to the NAC, DPPC, and NPG are a host of committees that supervise the various NATO logistics and standardisation agencies.

The NATO Military Committee advises and assists the NAC on military matters. The Defence Planning Committee which directs its output to the Division of Defence Policy and Planning, a nominally civilian department that works closely with the Military Committee's International Military Staff.

All agencies and organizations are integrated into either the civilian administrative or military executive roles. For the most part they perform roles and functions that directly or indirectly support the security role of the alliance as a whole.

== History ==
1952 NATO organisational chart

The DPC was a former senior decision-making body on matters relating to the integrated military structure of the Alliance. It was dissolved following a major committee review in June 2010 under Secretary-General Anders Fogh Rasmussen. Its responsibilities absorbed by the North Atlantic Council and the Defence Policy and Planning Committee (DPPC).

=== Civilian structure ===
In NATO: The First Five Years, Lord Ismay described the civilian structure as follows:

The ..Office of the Secretary General [is] directed by an Executive Secretary, Captain R.D. Coleridge (UK), who is also Secretary to the Council. He is responsible for supervising the general processing of the work of the Council and their committees, including provision of all secretarial assistance, as well as supervision of the administrative services of the Staff/Secretariat itself. Thus the Secretariat provides secretaries to all the Council's principal committees and working groups - apart from those of a strictly technical nature - and ensures co-ordination between them. .. On the Staff side there are three main divisions corresponding to the three principal aspects of NATO's work, each under an Assistant Secretary General. Ambassador Sergio Fenoaltea (Italy) heads the Political Affairs Division, M. Rene Sergent (France) the Economics and Finance Division, and Mr. Lowell P. Weicker (USA) the Production and Logistics Division. The Divisions' tasks are to prepare, in close touch with delegations, proposed action in their respective fields for consideration by the appropriate committee or by the Council. In addition to the main divisions there are three other offices working directly to the Secretary General. These are the Office of Statistics (Mr. Loring Wood of the USA), the Financial Comptroller's Office (M. A. J. Bastin of Belgium), and the Division of Information (Mr. Geoffrey Parsons, Jr. of the USA). The Information Division, besides providing material about NATO for the use of member governments, (it does not engage in independent operations), is also the press and public relations branch of the civilian authority.

=== Military structure ===
The Strategic Commanders are the former 'Major NATO Commanders', who sat atop a command hierarchy consisting of Major Subordinate Commanders (MSCs), Principal Subordinate Commanders (PSCs) and Sub-PSCs. The Military Committee had an executive body, the Standing Group, made up of representatives from France, the United States, and the United Kingdom. The Standing Group was abolished during the major reform of 1967 that resulted from France's departure from the NATO Military Command Structure.

==== Beginnings ====
NATO military command and areas of responsibilities (1954)

A key step in establishing the NATO Command Structure was the North Atlantic Council's selection of General Dwight D. Eisenhower as the first Supreme Allied Commander Europe (SACEUR) in December 1950. After Eisenhower arrived in Paris in January 1951, he and the other members of the multinational Supreme Headquarters Allied Powers Europe (SHAPE) Planning Group immediately began to devise a structure for the new Allied Command Europe. NATO official documents say '..The corner stone of the NATO Military Command Structure was laid.. when the North Atlantic Council approved D.C. 24/3 on 18 December 1951.' They quickly decided to divide Allied Command Europe into three regions: Allied Forces Northern Europe, containing Scandinavia, the North Sea and the Baltic; Allied Forces Central Europe, and Allied Forces Southern Europe (AFSOUTH), covering Italy and the Mediterranean. SHAPE was established at Rocquencourt, west of Paris.

The British post of Commander in Chief Mediterranean Fleet was given a dual-hatted role as NATO Commander in Chief of Allied Forces Mediterranean in charge of all forces assigned to NATO in the Mediterranean Area. The British made strong representations in discussions regarding the Mediterranean NATO command structure, wishing to retain their direction of NATO naval command in the Mediterranean to protect their sea lines of communication running through the Mediterranean to the Middle East and Far East.

In 1952, after Greece and Turkey joined the Alliance, Allied Land Forces South-Eastern Europe (LANDSOUTHEAST) was created in Izmir, Turkey, under a U.S. Army General. This was due to the two states' geographic distance from the LANDSOUTH headquarters, as well as disagreements over which nation should be the overall commander for their ground forces.

Military organisation of NATO mid-1960s, before the dissolution of the Standing Group (Source Pentagon Papers).

With the establishment of Allied Command Atlantic (ACLANT) on 30 January 1952, the Supreme Allied Commander Atlantic joined the previously created Supreme Allied Commander Europe as one of the alliance's two Major NATO Commanders. A third was added when Allied Command Channel was established on 21 February 1952 to control the English Channel and North Sea area and deny it to the enemy, and protect the sea lanes of communication. The establishment of this post, and the agreement that it was to be filled by the British Commander-in-Chief, Portsmouth, was part of the compromise that allowed an American officer to take up the SACLANT post. Previously Commander-in-Chief Portsmouth had controlled multinational naval operations in the area under WUDO auspices. In due course the CINCHAN role was assumed by the British Commander-in-Chief Fleet.

In 1966, when French president Charles de Gaulle withdrew French forces from the military command structure, NATO's headquarters was forced to move to Belgium. SHAPE was moved to Casteau, north of the Belgian city of Mons. Headquarters Allied Forces Central Europe was moved from the Chateau de Fontainebleau outside Paris to Brunssum, in the Netherlands.

==== Structure in 1989 ====
- NATO Military Committee, led by the Chairman of the NATO Military Committee, in Brussels, Belgium
  - Allied Command Europe (ACE), led by Supreme Allied Commander Europe (SACEUR), in Mons, Belgium
    - ACE Mobile Force, in Seckenheim, Germany
    - United Kingdom Air Forces, in High Wycombe, United Kingdom
    - NATO Airborne Early Warning Force, in Maisieres, Belgium
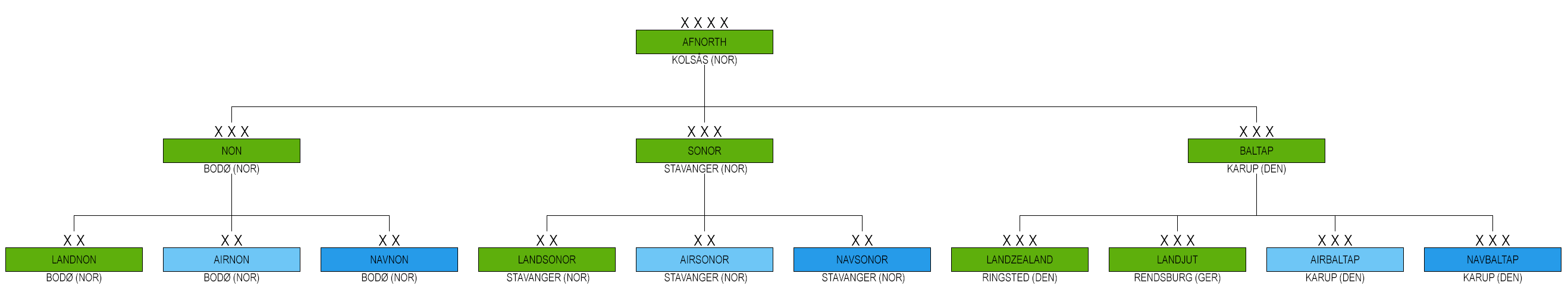
    - Command structure of AFNORTH in 1989 (click to enlarge)
      Allied Forces Northern Europe (AFNORTH), in Kolsås, Norway
      - Allied Forces North Norway (NON), in Bodø, Norway
      - Allied Forces South Norway (SONOR), in Stavanger, Norway
      - Allied Forces Baltic Approaches (BALTAP), in Karup, Denmark
        - Allied Land Forces Schleswig-Holstein and Jutland (LANDJUT), in Rendsburg, Germany
        - Allied Land Forces in Zealand (LANDZEALAND), in Ringsted, Denmark
        - Allied Air Forces Baltic Approaches (AIRBALTAP), in Karup, Denmark
        - Allied Naval Forces Baltic Approaches (NAVBALTAP), in Karup, Denmark
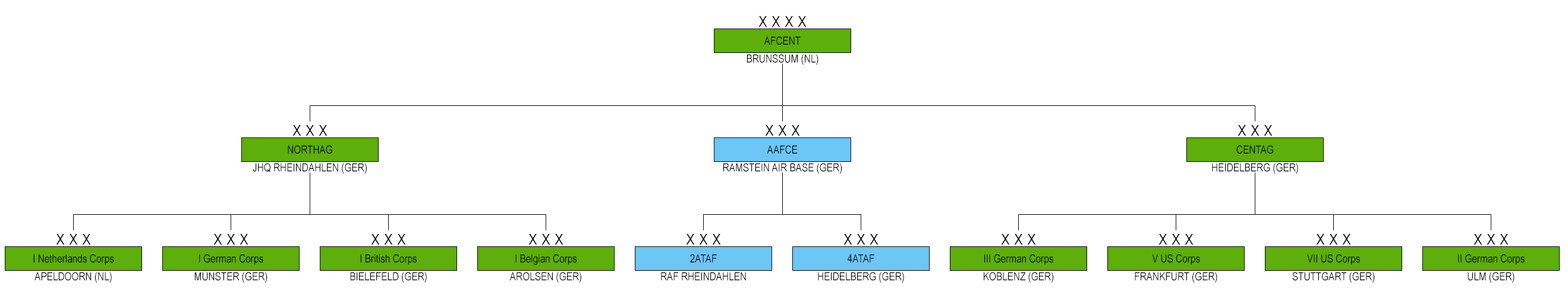
    - Command structure of AFCENT in 1989 (click to enlarge)
      Allied Forces Central Europe (AFCENT), in Brunssum, Netherlands
      - Northern Army Group (NORTHAG), in Rheindahlen, West Germany
      - Central Army Group (CENTAG), in Heidelberg, West Germany
      - Allied Air Forces Central Europe (AAFCE), in Ramstein, West Germany
        - Second Allied Tactical Air Force (2 ATAF), in Rheindahlen, West Germany
        - Fourth Allied Tactical Air Force (4 ATAF), in Ramstein, West Germany
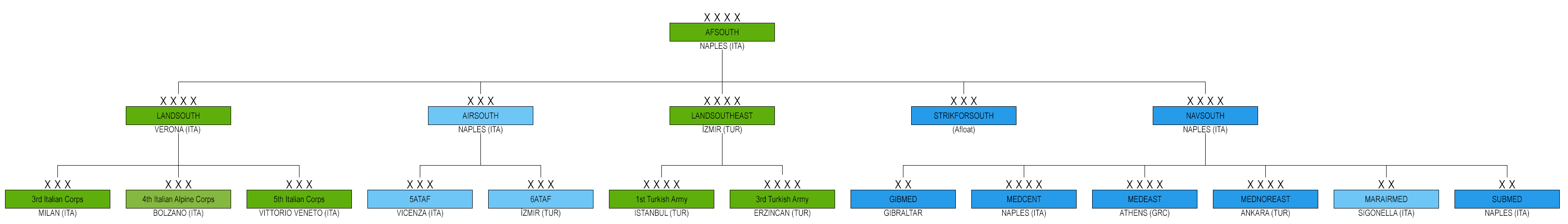
    - Command structure of AFSOUTH in 1989 (click to enlarge)
      Allied Forces Southern Europe (AFSOUTH), in Naples, Italy
      - Allied Land Forces Southern Europe (LANDSOUTH), in Verona, Italy
      - Allied Land Forces South-Eastern Europe (LANDSOUTHEAST), in İzmir, Turkey
      - Allied Air Forces Southern Europe (AIRSOUTH), in Naples, Italy
        - Fifth Allied Tactical Air Force (5 ATAF), in Vicenza, Italy
        - Sixth Allied Tactical Air Force (6 ATAF), in İzmir, Turkey
      - Allied Naval Forces Southern Europe (NAVSOUTH), in Naples, Italy
      - Naval Striking and Support Forces Southern Europe (STRIKFORSOUTH), afloat, centered around US Sixth Fleet
  - Allied Command Atlantic (ACLANT), led by Supreme Allied Commander Atlantic (SACLANT), in Norfolk, United States
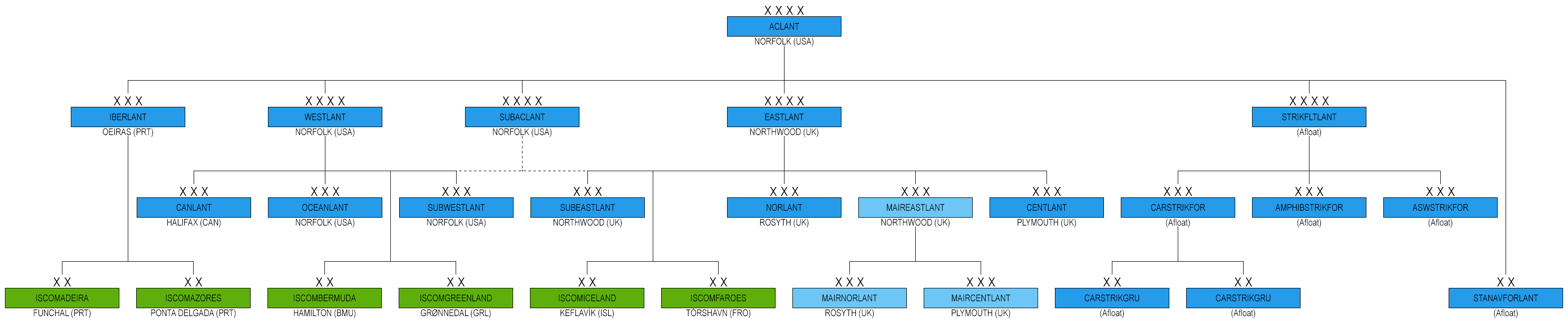
    - Command structure of ACLANT in 1989 (click to enlarge)
      Eastern Atlantic Area (EASTLANT), in Northwood, United Kingdom
      - Northern Sub-Area (NORLANT), in Rosyth, United Kingdom
      - Central Sub-Area (CENTLANT), in Plymouth, United Kingdom
      - Submarine Force Eastern Atlantic (SUBEASTLANT), in Gosport, United Kingdom
      - Maritime Air Eastern Atlantic (MAIREASTLANT), in Northwood, United Kingdom
        - Maritime Air Northern Sub-Area (MAIRNORLANT), in Rosyth, United Kingdom
        - Maritime Air Central Sub-Area (MAIRCENTLANT), in Plymouth, United Kingdom
      - Island Command Iceland (ISCOMICELAND), in Keflavík, Iceland
      - Island Command Faroes (ISCOMFAROES), in Tórshavn, Faroe Islands
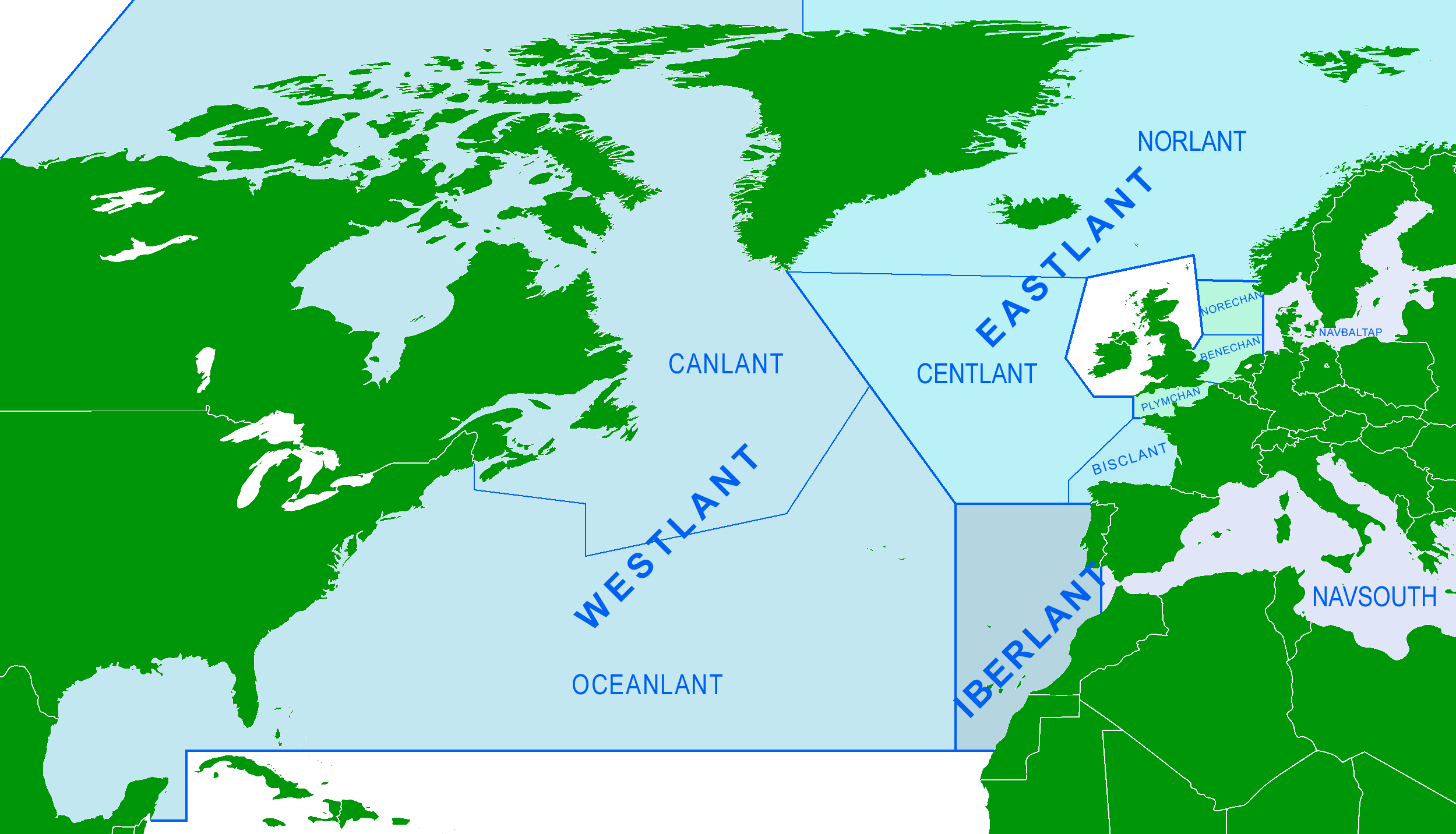
    - Command geographic subareas in NATO Atlantic and Channel commands (click to enlarge)
      Western Atlantic Area (WESTLANT), in Norfolk, United States
      - Ocean Sub-Area (OCEANLANT), in Norfolk, United States
      - Canadian Atlantic Sub-Area (CANLANT), in Halifax, Canada
      - Island Command Bermuda (ISCOMBERMUDA), in Hamilton, Bermuda
      - Island Command Azores (ISCOMAZORES), in Ponta Delgada, Azores
      - Island Command Greenland (ISCOMGREENLAND), in Grønnedal, Greenland
      - Submarine Force Western Atlantic (SUBWESTLANT), in Norfolk, United States
    - Iberian Atlantic Area (IBERLANT), in Oeiras, Portugal
      - Island Command Madeira (ISCOMADEIRA), in Funchal, Madeira
    - Striking Fleet Atlantic (STRIKFLTLANT), in Norfolk, United States
      - Carrier Striking Force (CARSTRIKFOR), in Norfolk, United States
        - Carrier Striking Group One (CARSTRIKGRUONE), in Norfolk, United States
        - Carrier Striking Group Two (CARSTRIKGRUTWO), in Plymouth, United Kingdom
    - Submarines Allied Command Atlantic (SUBACLANT), in Norfolk, United States
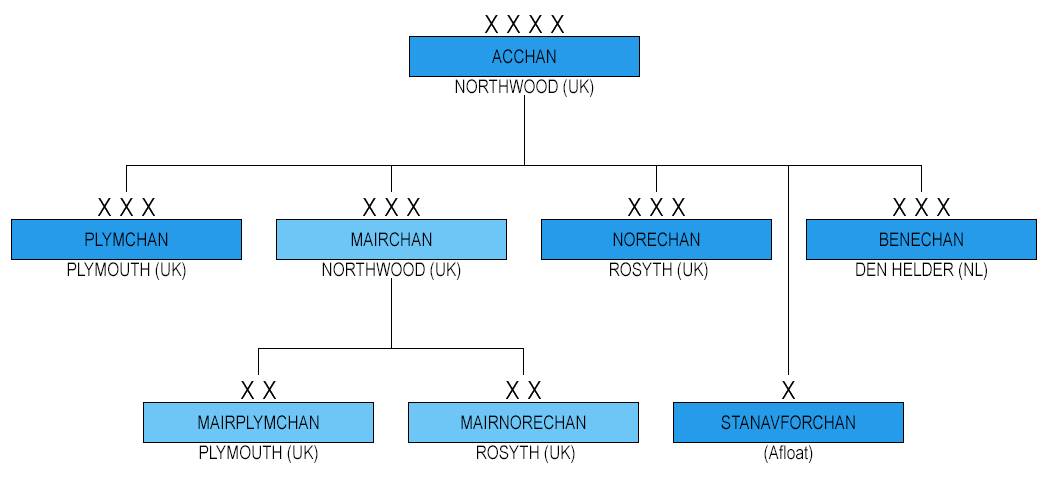
  - Command structure of ACCHAN in 1989 (click to enlarge)
    Allied Command Channel (ACCHAN), in Northwood, United Kingdom
    - Nore Sub-Area Channel Command (NORECHAN), in Rosyth, United Kingdom
    - Plymouth Sub-Area Channel Command (PLYMCHAN), in Plymouth, United Kingdom
    - Benelux Sub-Area Channel Command (BENECHAN), in Den Helder, Netherlands
    - Allied Maritime Air Force Channel (MAIRCHAN), in Northwood, United Kingdom
      - Maritime Air Nore Sub-Area Channel Command (MAIRNORECHAN), in Rosyth, United Kingdom
      - Maritime Air Plymouth Sub-Area Channel Command (MAIRPLYMCHAN), in Plymouth, United Kingdom
    - Standing Naval Force Channel (STANAVFORCHAN), afloat

==== After the Cold War ====
By June 1991, it was clear that Allied Forces Central Europe (a Major Subordinate Command) could be reduced, with the Soviet threat disappearing. Six multinational corps were to replace the previous eight. Announcements in June 1991 presaged main defensive forces consisting of six multinational corps. Two were to be under German command, one with a U.S. division, one under Belgian command with a pending offer of a U.S. brigade, one under U.S. command with a German division, one under joint German-Danish command (LANDJUT), and one under Dutch command. The new German IV Corps was to be stationed in Eastern Germany, and was not to be associated with the NATO structure.

On 1 July 1994, the Alliance disestablished Allied Command Channel, through retaining many of its subordinate structures after reshuffling. Most of the headquarters were absorbed within ACE, particularly within the new Allied Forces Northwestern Europe.

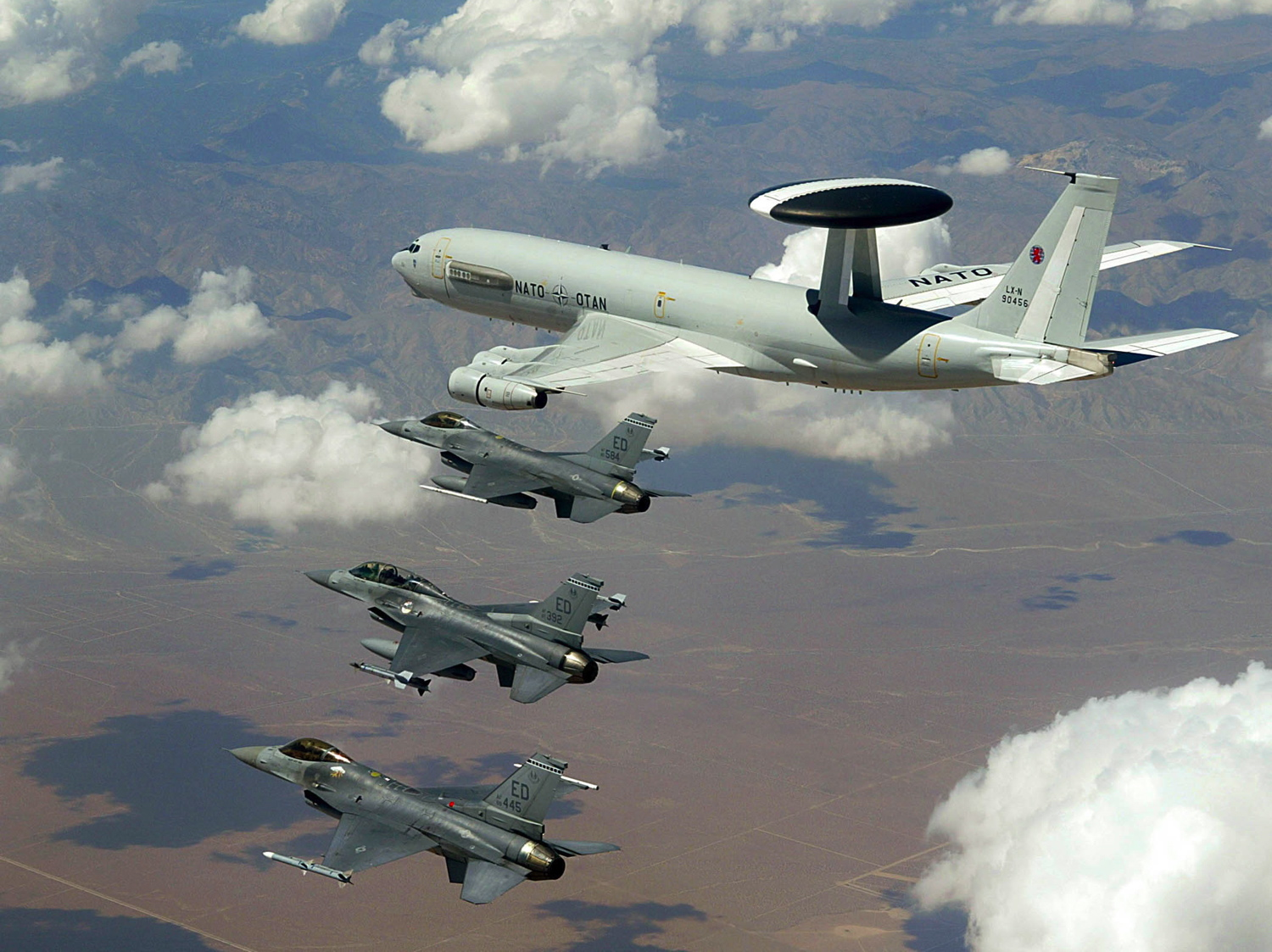
NATO E-3A flying with United States Air Force F-16 Fighting Falcons in a NATO exercise.

From 1994 to 1999 ACE had three Major Subordinate Commands, AFNORTHWEST, AFCENT, and AFSOUTH. In 1995 NATO began a Long Term Study to examine post-Cold War strategy and structure. Recommendations from the study for a new, streamlined structure emerged in 1996. The European and Atlantic commands were to be retained, but the number of major commands in Europe was to be cut from three to two, Regional Command North Europe and Regional Command South Europe. Activation of the new RC SOUTH occurred in September 1999, and in March 2000 Headquarters AFNORTHWEST closed and the new RC NORTH was activated. The headquarters of the two Regional Commands were known as Regional Headquarters South (RHQ South) and RHQ NORTH respectively. Each was to supervise air, naval, and land commands for their region as well as a number of Joint Subregional Commands (JSRCs). Among the new JSRCs was Joint Headquarters Southwest, which was activated in Madrid in September 1999.

=== Organizations and agencies ===
Prior to the reorganization, the NATO website listed 43 different agencies and organizations and five project committees/offices as of 15 May 2008. They included:

- Logistics committees, organisations and agencies, including:
  - NATO Maintenance and Supply Agency
  - Central Europe Pipeline System
  - NATO Pipeline System
- Production Logistics organisations, agencies and offices including the NATO Eurofighter and Tornado Management Agency
- Standardisation organisation, committee, office and agency including the NATO Standardization Agency which also plays an important role in the global arena of standards determination.
- Civil Emergency Planning committees and centre
- Air Traffic Management and Air Defence committees, working groups organisation and centre including the:
  - NATO ACCS Management Agency (NACMA), based in Brussels, manages around a hundred persons in charge of the Air Control and Command System (ACCS) due for 2009.
  - NATO Programming Centre
- The NATO Airborne Early Warning and Control Programme Management Organisation (NAPMO)
- NATO Consultation, Command and Control Organisation (NC3O)
  - NATO Consultation, Command and Control Agency (NC3A), reporting to the NATO Consultation, Command and Control Organization (NC3O). This agency was formed when the SHAPE Technical Centre (STC) in The Hague (Netherlands) merged in 1996 with the NATO Communications and Information Systems Operating and Support Agency (NACISA) based in Brussels (Belgium). The agency comprises around 650 staff, of which around 400 are located in The Hague and 250 in Brussels.
  - NATO Communications and Information Systems Services Agency (NCSA), based in Mons (BEL), was established in August 2004 from the former NATO Communications and Information Systems Operating and Support Agency (NACISA).
  - NATO Headquarters C3 Staff (NHQC3S), which supports the North Atlantic Council, Military Committee, International Staff, and the International Military Staff.
- NATO Electronic Warfare Advisory Committee (NEWAC)
- Military Committee Meteorological Group (MCMG)
- The Military Oceanography Group (MILOC)
- NATO Research and Technology Organisation (RTO),
- Education and Training college, schools and group
- Project Steering Committees and Project Offices, including:
  - Alliance Ground Surveillance Capability Provisional Project Office (AGS/PPO)
  - Battlefield Information Collection and Exploitation System (BICES)
  - NATO Continuous Acquisition and Life Cycle Support Office (CALS)
  - NATO FORACS Office
  - Munitions Safety Information Analysis Center (MSIAC)
- Committee of Chiefs of Military Medical Services in NATO (COMEDS)
- Defence Innovation Accelerator for the North Atlantic (DIANA)

== Civilian structure today ==
In the twenty-first century NATO has an extensive civilian structure, including:

- Public Diplomacy Division
- NATO Office of Security (NOS)
- Executive Management
- Division of Political Affairs and Security Policy
- Division of Operations
- Division of Defence Policy and Planning
- Division of Defence Investment
- NATO Office of Resources (NOR)
- NATO Headquarters Consultation, Command and Control Staff (NHQC3S)
- Office of the Financial Controller (FinCon)
- Office of the Chairman of the Senior Resource Board (SRB)
- Office of the Chairman of the Civil and Military Budget Committees (CBC/MBC)
- International Board of Auditors for NATO (IBAN)
- NATO Production and Logistics Organizations (NPLO)

The Defence Planning Committee (DPC) is normally composed of Permanent Representatives, but meets at the level of Defence Ministers at least twice a year. It deals with most defence matters and subjects related to collective defence planning. In this it serves as a coordinating body between the Civilian and Military organizational bureaucracies of NATO.

The Defence Planning Committee was a former senior decision-making body on matters relating to the integrated military structure of the Alliance. It was dissolved following a major committee review in June 2010 and its responsibilities absorbed by the North Atlantic Council and the Defence Policy and Planning Committee (DPPC).

== Military command structure ==
NATO's military operations are directed by the Chairman of the NATO Military Committee and split into two Strategic Commands, both long commanded by U.S. officers, assisted by a staff drawn from across NATO. The Strategic Commanders are responsible to the NATO Military Committee for the overall direction and conduct of all Alliance military matters within their areas of command.

On 12 June 2003 NATO ministers announced an end to the decades-old structure of a command each for the Atlantic and Europe. Allied Command Operations (ACO) was to be established, responsible for the strategic, operational and tactical management of combat and combat support forces of the NATO members, and Allied Command Transformation (ACT) responsible for the induction of the new member states' forces into NATO, and NATO forces' research and training capability. The European allies had become concerned about the possibility of a loosening of U.S. ties to NATO if there were no longer any U.S.-led NATO HQ in the United States, and the refocusing of the Atlantic command into a transformation command was the result. The alliance created several NATO Rapid Deployable Corps and naval High Readiness Forces (HRFs), which all report to Allied Command Operations. In Europe the Regional Commands were replaced by JFC Brunssum and JFC Naples, and the JSRCs disappeared (though the Madrid JSRC became a land command for JFC Naples).

The commander of Allied Command Operations retained the title "Supreme Allied Commander Europe", and remains based at SHAPE at Casteau. He is a U.S. four-star general or admiral with the dual-hatted role of heading United States European Command. ACO includes Joint Force Command Brunssum in the Netherlands, Joint Force Command Naples in Italy, and Joint Force Command Lisbon in Portugal, all multi-national headquarters with many nations represented. From 2003, JFC Brunssum had its land component, Allied Land Component Command Headquarters Heidelberg at Heidelberg, Germany, its air component, Allied Air Command Ramstein, at Ramstein in Germany, and its naval component at the Northwood Headquarters in the northwest suburbs of London. JFC Naples has its land component in Madrid, air component at İzmir, Turkey, and its naval component, Allied Maritime Command Naples, in Naples, Italy. It also directed KFOR in Kosovo. Joint Command Lisbon was a smaller HQ with no subordinate commands.

In 2012–2013, the Military Command Structure was reorganised. Allied Force Command Madrid was disestablished on 1 July 2013, the Heidelberg force command also deactivated, the maritime component command at Naples was closed and the air component command at Izmir also shut down. Allied Air Command Izmir was reorganised as Allied Land Command.

Allied Maritime Command was created on 1 December 2012.

A number of NATO Force Structure formations, such as the NATO Rapid Deployable Corps, are answerable ultimately to SACEUR either directly or through the component commands. Directly responsible to SACEUR is the NATO Airborne Early Warning Force at NATO Air Base Geilenkirchen in Germany where a jointly funded fleet of Boeing E-3 Sentry Airborne early warning and control radar (AWACS) aircraft are located. The Boeing C-17 Globemaster IIIs of the Strategic Airlift Capability, which became fully operational in July 2009, are based at Pápa airfield in Hungary. However, the Strategic Airlift Capability was later separated from NATO and is now an independent organisation, though it still works closely with NATO.

Allied Command Transformation (ACT) is based in the former Allied Command Atlantic headquarters in Norfolk, Virginia, United States. It is headed by the Supreme Allied Commander Transformation (SACT), a French officer. There is also an ACT command element located at SHAPE in Mons, Belgium. In June 2009 Le Figaro named the French officer who was to take command of ACT following France's return to the NATO Military Command Structure. Subordinate ACT organizations include the Joint Warfare Centre (JWC) located in Stavanger, Norway (in the same site as the former Norwegian Armed Forces National Joint HQ); the Joint Force Training Centre (JFTC) in Bydgoszcz, Poland; and the Joint Analysis and Lessons Learned Centre (JALLC) in Monsanto, Portugal. The NATO Undersea Research Centre (NURC) at La Spezia, Italy, was also part of ACT until it was shifted under the auspices of the NATO Science & Technology Organization.

In early 2015, in the wake of the War in Donbas, meetings of NATO ministers decided that Multinational Corps Northeast would be augmented so as to develop greater capabilities, to, if thought necessary, prepare to defend the Baltic States, and that a new Multinational Division Southeast would be established in Romania. Six NATO Force Integration Units would also be established to coordinate preparations for defence of new Eastern members of NATO.

Multinational Division Southeast was activated on 1 December 2015. Headquarters Multinational Division South – East (HQ MND-SE) is a North Atlantic Council (NAC) activated NATO military body under operational command (OPCOM) of Supreme Allied Commander Europe (SACEUR) which may be employed and deployed in peacetime, crisis and operations.

On 25 April 2017, the commander-designate of the new Multinational Division Northeast arrived at the headquarters location at Elbląg, Poland. On 3 July 2017, the new division reached initial operational capability (IOC). The division is tasked to coordinate the four NATO Enhanced Forward Presence battlegroups and to carry out Article 5 collective defence activities.

In late 2017-early 2018, two new commands were approved, a rear area transit command which was finally announced as the Joint Support and Enabling Command, to be located at Ulm, Germany, and a new command for the Atlantic. In March 2018 Chair of the Military Committee General Petr Pavel announced that the new Atlantic command would become part of the NATO Command Structure at the level of a Joint Force Command, similar to the two that exist at Brunssum and Naples. On 7 June 2018 the Secretary-General said the new joint forces command will have its headquarters in Norfolk, Virginia, in the United States. The name was confirmed as Joint Force Command Norfolk at the NATO Summit in July. It was to be commanded by the vice-admiral who leads the United States Second Fleet. On 15 July 2021 Joint Force Command Norfolk (JFC-NF) attained Full operational capability (FOC) under the command of Vice Admiral Andrew Lewis.

=== Canada-US Regional Planning Group ===
The Canada-US Regional Planning Group (CUSRPG) is the only survivor of the originally five regional planning groups of the late 1940s and early 1950s. All the others were subsumed into Allied Command Europe and Allied Command Atlantic. In August 1953 it was tasked to '..(a) Prepare, approve and forward to the Military Committee, through the Standing Group, plans for and other material pertaining to, the defense of the Canada-U.S. Region. (b) Coordinate plans with SACLANT and other NATO Commands. The NATO Handbook stated in 1990s editions that it was responsible for the defence of the US-Canada area and meets alternatively in Washington, D.C., and Ottawa. As such it appears to duplicate, in part, the work of the Permanent Joint Board on Defence.

== NATO networks ==
There are several communications networks used by NATO to support its exercises and operations:

- Battlefield Information Collection and Exploitation Systems (BICES)
- Crisis Response Operations in NATO Operating Systems (CRONOS), which is a system of interconnected computer networks used by NATO to transmit classified information at the level of NATO Secret.
- Combined Federated Battle Laboratories Network (CFBLNet), which is a wide area network connecting the US, the UK, Canada, Australia, New Zealand, six NATO countries and Sweden for sharing research and development information.

== Organizations and agencies ==
A major reorganization of the NATO Agencies was agreed at a meeting of the defence ministers from NATO's 28 member states on 8 June 2011. The new Agencies' structure would be built upon the existing one:

- Headquarters for the NATO Support Agency would be in Capellen Luxembourg (site of the NATO Maintenance and Supply Agency – NAMSA).
- The NATO Communications and Information Agency Headquarters would be in Brussels, as would be the very small staff which will design the new NATO Procurement Agency.
- A new NATO Science and Technology Organization (STO) would be created before July 2012, consisting of Chief Scientist (located in the Office of the Chief Scientist, OCS), a Programme Office for Collaborative S&T (the Collaboration Support Office, CSO), and the Centre for Maritime Research and Experimentation (CMRE, previously named the NATO Undersea Research Centre).
- The current NATO Standardization Agency would continue and be subject to review by Spring 2014. The NSA was transformed to become the NATO Standardization Office (NSO) on 1 July 2014.

== See also ==
- NATO summit
