= Secretary General of NATO =

Diplomatic head of NATO

Secretary General of the North Atlantic Treaty Organization
- Secrétaire général de l'OTAN (French)
- Logo of NATO

- Flag of NATO

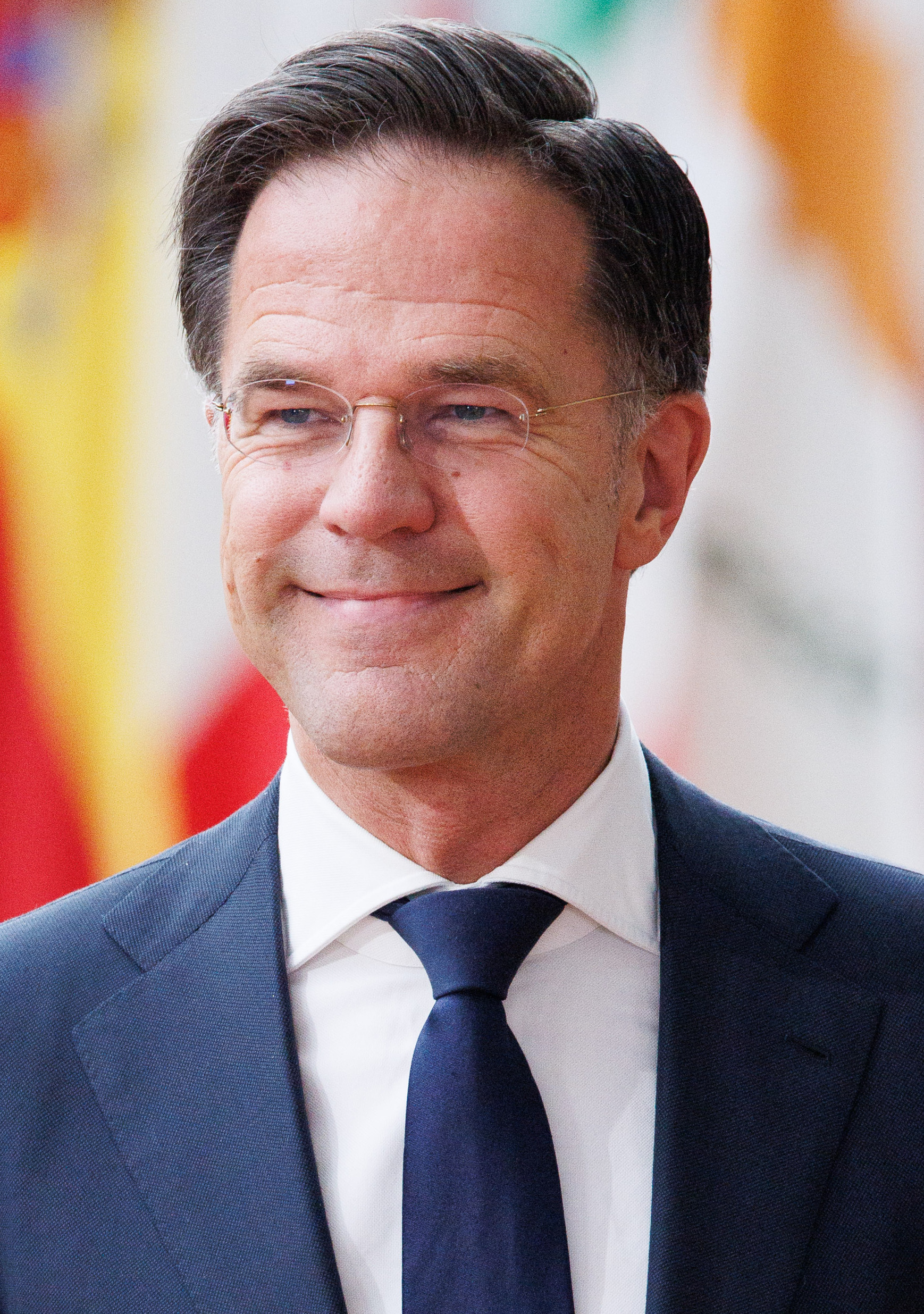
- Incumbent; Mark Rutte since 1 October 2024
- North Atlantic Treaty Organization
- Type: Chairperson; Spokesperson
- Abbreviation: NATO SecGen
- Member of: North Atlantic Council
- Seat: NATO headquarters
- Appointer: Member states
- Term length: Four years, renewable
- Formation: 24 March 1952; 74 years ago
- First holder: Hastings Ismay, 1st Baron Ismay
- Deputy: Deputy Secretary General
- Website: Office of the Secretary General

The secretary general of NATO is the chief civil servant of the North Atlantic Treaty Organization (NATO), an intergovernmental military alliance with 32 member states. The officeholder is an international diplomat responsible for coordinating the workings of the alliance, leading NATO's international staff, chairing the meetings of the North Atlantic Council and most major committees of the alliance, with the notable exception of the NATO Military Committee, as well as acting as NATO's spokesperson. The secretary general does not have a military command role; political, military and strategic decisions ultimately rest with the member states. Together with the chair of the NATO Military Committee and the supreme allied commander, the officeholder is one of the foremost officials of NATO.

By tradition, the position has always been held by a European. The current secretary general is former Dutch prime minister Mark Rutte, who took office on 1 October 2024.

== History ==
Article 9 of the North Atlantic Treaty requires NATO members to "establish a Council, on which each of them shall be represented." Accordingly, the North Atlantic Council was formed. Initially the Council consisted of NATO members' foreign ministers and met annually. In May 1950, the desire for closer coordination on a day-to-day basis led to the appointment of Council deputies, permanently based in London and overseeing the workings of the organization. Deputies were given full decision-making authority within the North Atlantic Council, but their work was supplemented by occasional meetings of the NATO foreign ministers. The chairman of the deputies was given responsibility "for directing the organization and its work," including all of its civilian agencies.

The Council deputies met for the first time on July 25, 1950, and selected Charles Spofford, the United States deputy, as their chairman. Several important organisational changes quickly followed the establishment of Council deputies, most notably the establishment of a unified military command under a single supreme allied commander. This unification and the growing challenges facing NATO led to rapid growth in the institutions of the organisation and in 1951, NATO was reorganized to streamline and centralize its bureaucracy. As part of the organization, the Council deputies were delegated with the authority to represent their governments in all matters, including those related to defense and finance, not just foreign affairs, greatly increasing their power and importance.

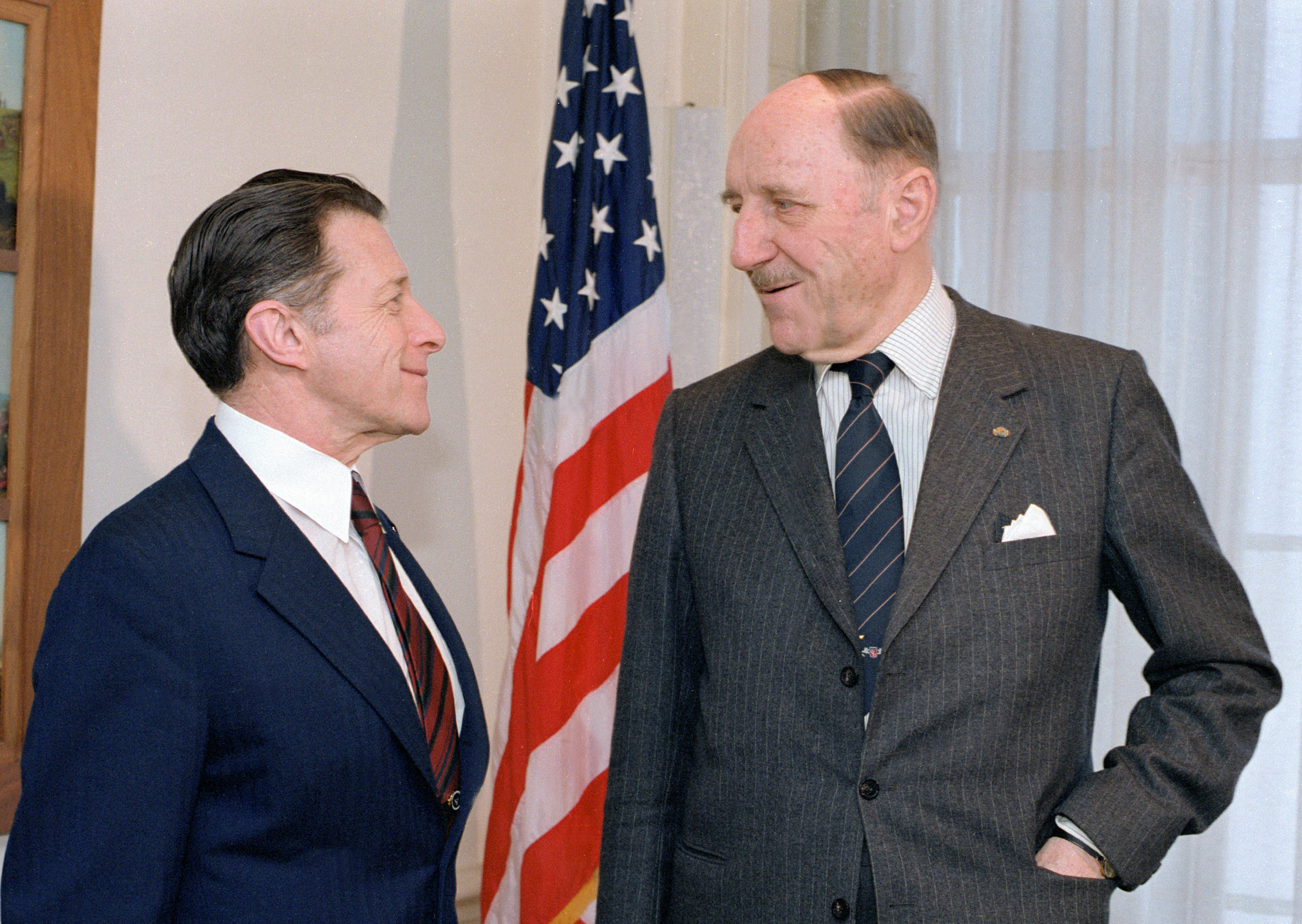
Secretary General Joseph Luns meets with United States Secretary of Defense Caspar Weinberger on 25 May 1983.

As the authority of the deputies increased, and the size of the organization grew, NATO established the Temporary Council Committee, chaired by W. Averell Harriman. This group established an official secretariat in Paris to command NATO's bureaucracy. The committee also recommended that "the agencies of NATO needed to be strengthened and co-ordinate", and emphasized the need for someone other than the chairman of the North Atlantic Council to become the senior leader of the alliance. In February 1952, North Atlantic Council accordingly established the position of secretary general to manage all civilian agencies of the organization, control its civilian staff, and serve the North Atlantic Council.

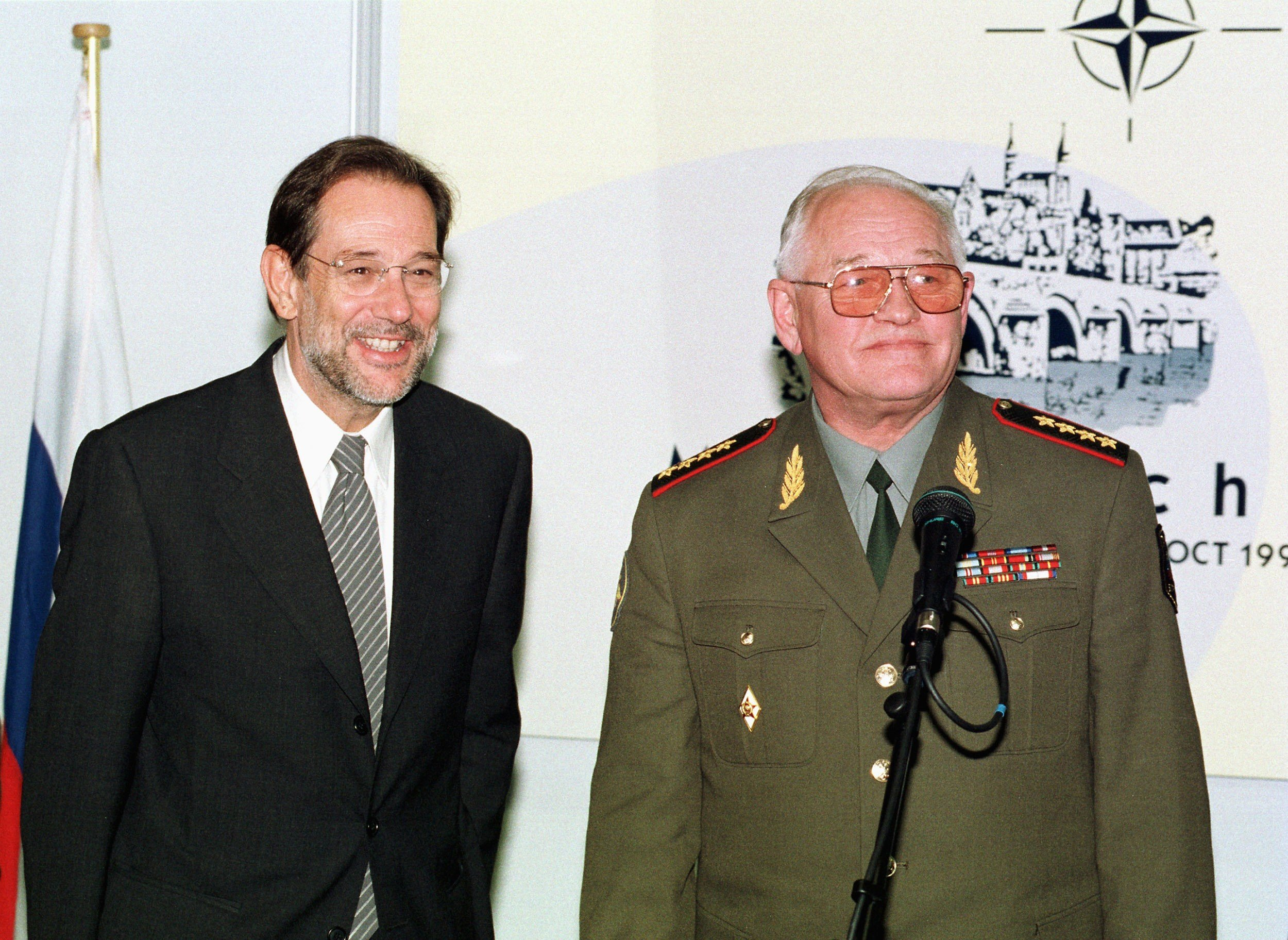
Secretary General Javier Solana and Russian Defense Minister Igor Sergeyev on 1 October 1997.

After the Lisbon Conference, the NATO states began looking for a person who could fill the role of secretary general. The position was first offered to Oliver Franks, the British ambassador to the United States, but he declined. Then, on March 12, 1952, the North Atlantic Council selected Hastings Ismay, a general from the Second World War, and secretary of state for commonwealth relations in the British cabinet as secretary general. Unlike later secretaries general who served as chairman of the North Atlantic Council, Ismay was made the vice chairman of the council, with Spofford continuing to serve as chairman. Ismay was selected because of his high rank in the war, and his role "at the side of Churchill ... in the highest Allied Councils." As both a soldier and a diplomat, he was considered uniquely qualified for the position, and enjoyed the full support of all the NATO states. Several months later, after Spofford retired from NATO, the structure of the North Atlantic Council was changed slightly. One member of the council was selected annually as the president of the North Atlantic Council (a largely ceremonial role), and the secretary general officially became the deputy president of the council, as well as the chair of its meetings. Ismay served as secretary general until retiring in May, 1957.

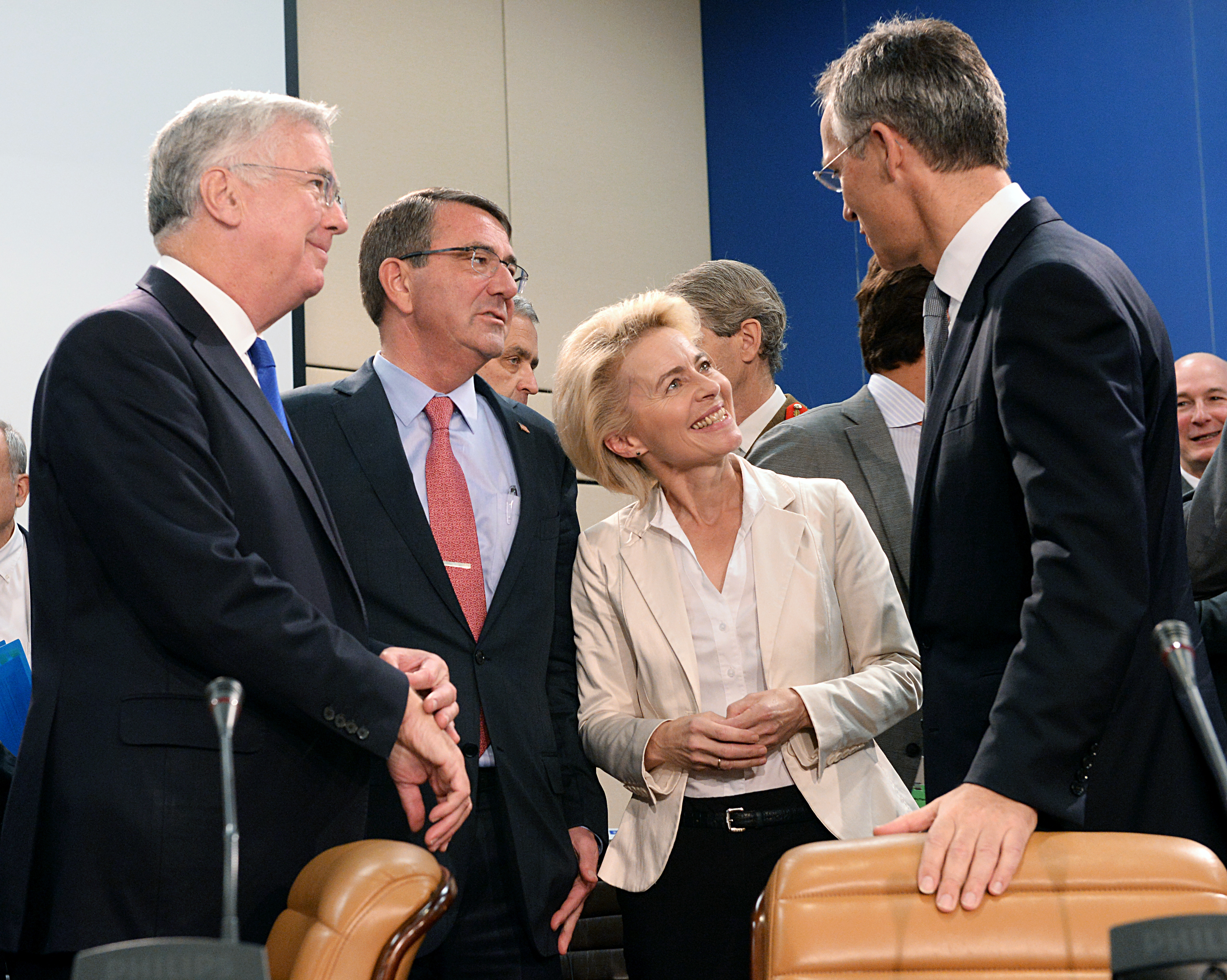
Secretary General Jens Stoltenberg, German Defence Minister Ursula von der Leyen, US Defense Secretary Ash Carter and UK Defence Secretary Michael Fallon in Brussels, October 2015.

After Ismay, Paul-Henri Spaak, an international diplomat and former prime minister of Belgium, was selected as the second secretary general. Unlike Ismay, Spaak had no military experience, so his appointment represented a "deemphasis of the strictly military side of the Atlantic Alliance." When confirming Spaak's appointment in December 1956 during a session of the NATO foreign ministers, the North Atlantic Council also expanded the role of the secretary general in the organization. Largely as a result of the Suez Crisis, which had strained intra-alliance relations, the council issued a resolution to allow the secretary general "to offer his good offices informally at any time to member governments involved in a dispute and with their consent to initiate or facilitate procedures of inquiry, mediation, conciliation, or arbitration."

== List of officeholders ==
The NATO countries selected the first secretary general on 4 April 1952. Since that time, twelve different diplomats have served officially as secretary general. Eight countries have been represented, with four secretaries general hailing from the Netherlands, three from the United Kingdom, two from Belgium and one each from Italy, Germany, Spain, Denmark and Norway. The position has also been occupied temporarily on three occasions by an acting secretary general between appointments.

No.	Portrait	Secretary General	Took office	Left office	Time in office	Previous office	Country of origin
1	Hastings Ismay1st Baron Ismay	General; Hastings Ismay; 1st Baron Ismay (1887–1965)	24 March 1952	16 May 1957	5 years, 53 days	Secretary of State for Commonwealth Relations	United Kingdom
2	Paul-Henri Spaak	Paul-Henri Spaak (1899–1972)	16 May 1957	21 April 1961	3 years, 340 days	Prime Minister of Belgium	Belgium
3	Dirk Stikker	Dirk Stikker (1897–1979) (Note: Stikker resigned from his position a year early due to poor health.)	21 April 1961	1 August 1964	3 years, 102 days	Minister of Foreign Affairs	Netherlands
4	Manlio Brosio	Manlio Brosio (1897–1980)	1 August 1964	1 October 1971	7 years, 61 days	Ambassador to the United Kingdom	Italy
5	Joseph Luns	Joseph Luns (1911–2002)	1 October 1971	25 June 1984	12 years, 268 days	Minister of Foreign Affairs	Netherlands
6	Peter Carington6th Baron Carrington	Peter Carington; 6th Baron Carrington (1919–2018)	25 June 1984	1 July 1988	4 years, 6 days	Secretary of State for Foreign and Commonwealth Affairs	United Kingdom
7	Manfred Wörner	Manfred Wörner (1934–1994) (Note: Wörner died in office on 13 August 1994 of cancer. The Deputy Secretary General, Sergio Balanzino, took over his daily responsibilities for the last several months of his life and then became acting Secretary General upon his death until the appointment of Willy Claes.)	1 July 1988	13 August 1994 †	6 years, 43 days	Minister of Defence	Germany
–	Sergio Balanzino	Sergio Balanzino (1934–2018); Acting	13 August 1994	17 October 1994	65 days	Deputy Secretary; General of NATO	Italy
8	Willy Claes	Willy Claes (born 1938) (Note: Claes resigned as Secretary General after a bribery scandal, centering on his actions in the Belgian cabinet in the 1980s. After his resignation, Deputy Secretary General Sergio Balanzino served as acting Secretary General until the appointment of Javier Solana.)	17 October 1994	20 October 1995	1 year, 3 days	Minister of Foreign Affairs	Belgium
–	Sergio Balanzino	Sergio Balanzino (1934–2018); Acting	20 October 1995	5 December 1995	46 days	Deputy Secretary; General of NATO	Italy
9	Javier Solana	Javier Solana (born 1942)	5 December 1995	14 October 1999	3 years, 313 days	Minister of Foreign Affairs	Spain
10	George RobertsonBaron Robertson of Port Ellen	George Robertson; Baron Robertson of Port Ellen (born 1946) (Note: George Robertson announced in January 2003 that he would be stepping down in December. Jaap de Hoop Scheffer was selected as his successor, but could not assume the office until January 2004 because of his commitment in the Dutch Parliament. Robertson was asked to extend his term until Scheffer was ready, but declined, so Minuto-Rizzo, the Deputy Secretary General, took over in the interim.)	14 October 1999	17 December 2003	4 years, 64 days	Secretary of State for Defence	United Kingdom
–	Alessandro Minuto-Rizzo	Alessandro; Minuto-Rizzo (born 1940); Acting	17 December 2003	1 January 2004	15 days	Deputy Secretary; General of NATO	Italy
11	Jaap de Hoop Scheffer	Jaap de Hoop; Scheffer (born 1948) (Note: Scheffer was named Secretary General of NATO effective 1 January 2004, but he did not take office until 5 January 2004.)	1 January 2004	1 August 2009	5 years, 212 days	Minister of Foreign Affairs	Netherlands
12	Anders Fogh Rasmussen	Anders Fogh; Rasmussen (born 1953)	1 August 2009	1 October 2014	5 years, 61 days	Prime Minister of Denmark	Denmark
13	Jens Stoltenberg	Jens Stoltenberg (born 1959)	1 October 2014	1 October 2024	10 years, 0 days	Prime Minister of Norway	Norway
14	Mark Rutte	Mark Rutte (born 1967)	1 October 2024	Incumbent	1 year, 341 days	Prime Minister of the Netherlands	Netherlands

== Responsibilities ==
The NATO secretary general chairs several of the senior decision-making bodies of NATO. In addition to the North Atlantic Council, he was the chairman of the Defence Planning Committee before it was dissolved in 2010 and the chairman of the Nuclear Planning Group, two of NATO's important military organizations. The secretary general also leads the Euro-Atlantic Partnership Council, the Mediterranean Cooperation Group, and serves as joint chairman of the Permanent Joint Council and the NATO-Ukraine Commission.

In a second role, the secretary general leads the staff of NATO. He directs the international staff of the organization, and the Office of the Secretary General. The secretary general also directs his or her own private office. All of these bodies draw personnel from all members of NATO, so the secretary general must carefully coordinate. For assistance in his responsibilities, the secretary general also has a deputy appointed by the organization.

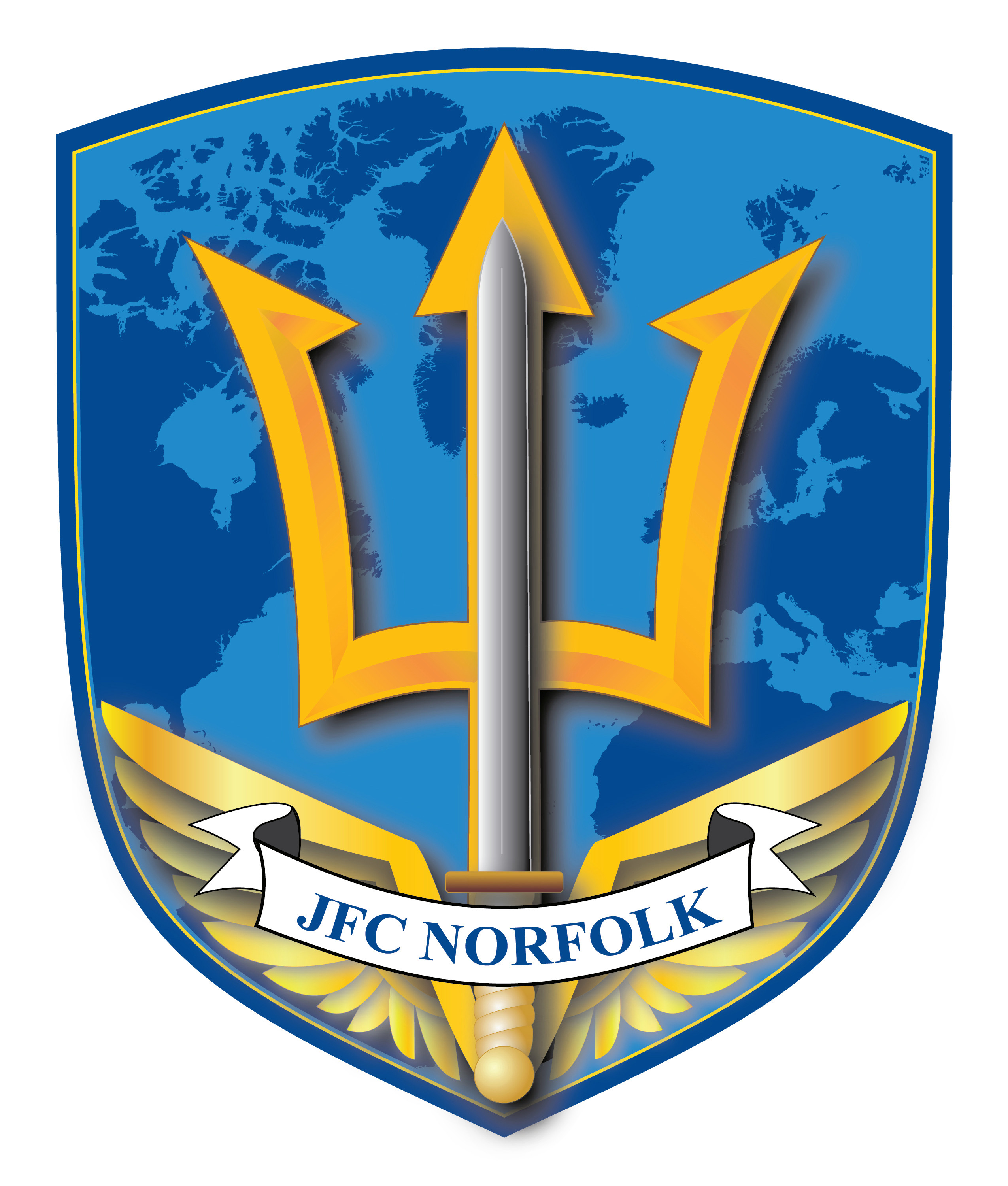
POLITICAL-STRATEGIC LEVEL:	North Atlantic Council (NAC); NATO Headquarters, Brussels, BEL
Secretary-General (SECGEN); NATO Headquarters, Brussels, BEL	International Staff (IS); NATO Headquarters, Brussels, BEL
MILITARY-STRATEGIC LEVEL:
International Military Staff (IMS); NATO Headquarters, Brussels, BEL	Military Committee (MC); NATO Headquarters, Brussels, BEL
STRATEGIC COMMANDS:
Supreme Allied Commander Transformation; Allied Command Transformation (ACT); Norfolk, U.S.	Supreme Allied Commander Europe; Allied Command Operations (ACO); Mons, BEL
TRANSFORMATION COMMANDS:	OPERATIONAL COMMANDS:
Joint Warfare Centre (JWC); Stavanger, NOR	Joint Force Command Brunssum (JFC Brunssum); Brunssum, NLD	Allied Air Command (AIRCOM); Ramstein, DEU
Joint Force Training Centre (JFTC); Bydgoszcz, POL	Joint Force Command Naples (JFC Naples); Naples, ITA	Allied Land Command (LANDCOM); İzmir, TUR
Joint Analysis and Lessons Learned Centre (JALLC); Lisbon, PRT	Joint Force Command Norfolk (JFC Norfolk); Norfolk, Virginia, U.S.	Allied Maritime Command (MARCOM); Northwood, GBR
Joint Support and Enabling Command (JSEC); Ulm, DEU

== Selection ==
There is no formal process for selecting the secretary general. The members of NATO traditionally reach a consensus on who should serve next. This procedure often takes place through informal diplomatic channels, but it still can become contentious. For example, in 2009, controversy arose over the choice of Anders Fogh Rasmussen as secretary general, due to opposition from Turkey.

NATO's chief military officer, the supreme allied commander Europe, is traditionally an American, and the secretary general has traditionally been a European. However, there is nothing in NATO's charter that would preclude a Canadian or American from becoming the secretary general.

== Deputy Secretary General ==
List of deputy secretaries general of NATO
#	Name	Country	Duration
1	Jonkheer van Vredenburch	Netherlands	1952–1956
2	Baron Adolph Bentinck	Netherlands	1956–1958
3	Alberico Casardi	Italy	1958–1962
4	Guido Colonna di Paliano	Italy	1962–1964
5	James A. Roberts	Canada	1964–1968
6	Osman Esim Olcay	Turkey	1969–1971
7	Paolo Pansa Cedronio	Italy	1971–1978
8	Rinaldo Petrignani	Italy	1978–1981
9	Eric da Rin	Italy	1981–1985
10	Marcello Guidi	Italy	1985–1989
11	Amedeo de Franchis	Italy	1989–1994
12	Sergio Balanzino	Italy	1994–2001
13	Alessandro Minuto-Rizzo	Italy	2001–2007
14	Claudio Bisogniero	Italy	2007–2012
15	Alexander Vershbow	United States	2012–2016
16	Rose Gottemoeller	United States	2016–2019
17	Mircea Geoană	Romania	2019–2024
18	Radmila Šekerinska	North Macedonia	2024–

== See also ==
- Supreme Allied Commander Europe
- Chairman of the NATO Military Committee
- Secretary General of the CSTO – Collective Security Treaty Organization (CSTO) equivalent
