= Allied Naval Forces Southern Europe =

Component Command in Nato's AFSOUTH

Allied Naval Forces Southern Europe (NAVSOUTH) was a Component Command in NATO's Allied Forces Southern Europe (AFSOUTH).

Between 1951 and 1953, after the establishment of AFSOUTH, Commander-in-Chief Allied Forces Southern Europe, initially Admiral Robert Carney of the United States, also held the title of Commander, Allied Naval Forces Southern Europe. With the creation of Allied Forces Mediterranean in 1953, a British-led major NATO Subordinate Command that was responsible for maritime operations in the southern region the command and title was disestablished.

In 1967 the NATO Military Command Structure was reorganised with the disbandment of Allied Forces Mediterranean. Established in partial recompense was NAVSOUTH, reactivated on 5 June 1967. The first commander of the reactivated organisation was Admiral Luciano Sotgiu of the Italian Navy. Its headquarters was located on Nisida island, Naples, Italy. NAVSOUTH's tasks were the control of the sea, a 24-hour surveillance of its area of responsibility, the protection of the sea lines of communication, as well as the naval control of shipping in the Mediterranean Sea and the Black Sea.

On 28 May 1969 the future establishment of the Naval On-Call Force Mediterranean (NAVOCFORMED) was approved by the NATO Defence Planning Committee. The ships were to be called together and exercised at least once a year. Later the force was upgraded to standing status and renamed Standing Naval Force Mediterranean. Also formed later was the Mine Counter Measures Mediterranean Force (MCMFORMED)

At the end of the Cold War the structure of Allied Naval Forces Southern Europe was as follows:

- Allied Naval Forces Southern Europe (NAVSOUTH), in Naples, Italy, with the following national commands of Mediterranean NATO members:
  - Commander Gibraltar Mediterranean (COMGIBMED), in Gibraltar, under a Royal Navy Rear Admiral and Flag Officer Gibraltar
  - Commander Western Mediterranean (COMMEDWEST), under a French Navy admiral, until 1962 in Algiers, then Toulon, after France left NATO's integrated command structure in 1966 the command was absorbed by NAVSOUTH
  - Commander Central Mediterranean (COMEDCENT), in Naples, under an Italian Navy admiral
  - Commander Eastern Mediterranean (COMEDEAST), in Athens, under a Greek Navy admiral
  - Commander South-Eastern Mediterranean (COMMEDSOUTHEAST), under a British admiral in Malta, after the disbanding of the Mediterranean Fleet, the command was absorbed by NAVSOUTH
  - Commander North-eastern Mediterranean (COMEDNOREAST), in Ankara, under a Turkish Navy admiral (includes the Black Sea)

In 2004, NAVSOUTH became Allied Maritime Command Naples.

== Operations ==
From 1992 to 1996, COMNAVSOUTH led the joint Western European Union (WEU)/NATO maritime operation known as Operation Sharp Guard in support of NATO operations in the Balkans. The operation replaced naval blockades Operation Maritime Guard (of NATO; begun by the U.S. in November 1992) and Sharp Fence (of the WEU). It put them under a single chain of command and control (the "Adriatic Military Committee", over which the NATO and WEU Councils exerted joint control), to address what their respective Councils viewed as wasteful duplication of effort. Some maintain that despite the nominal official joint command and control of the operation, in reality it was NATO staff that ran the operation.
