= Defense Meritorious Service Medal =

United States military award

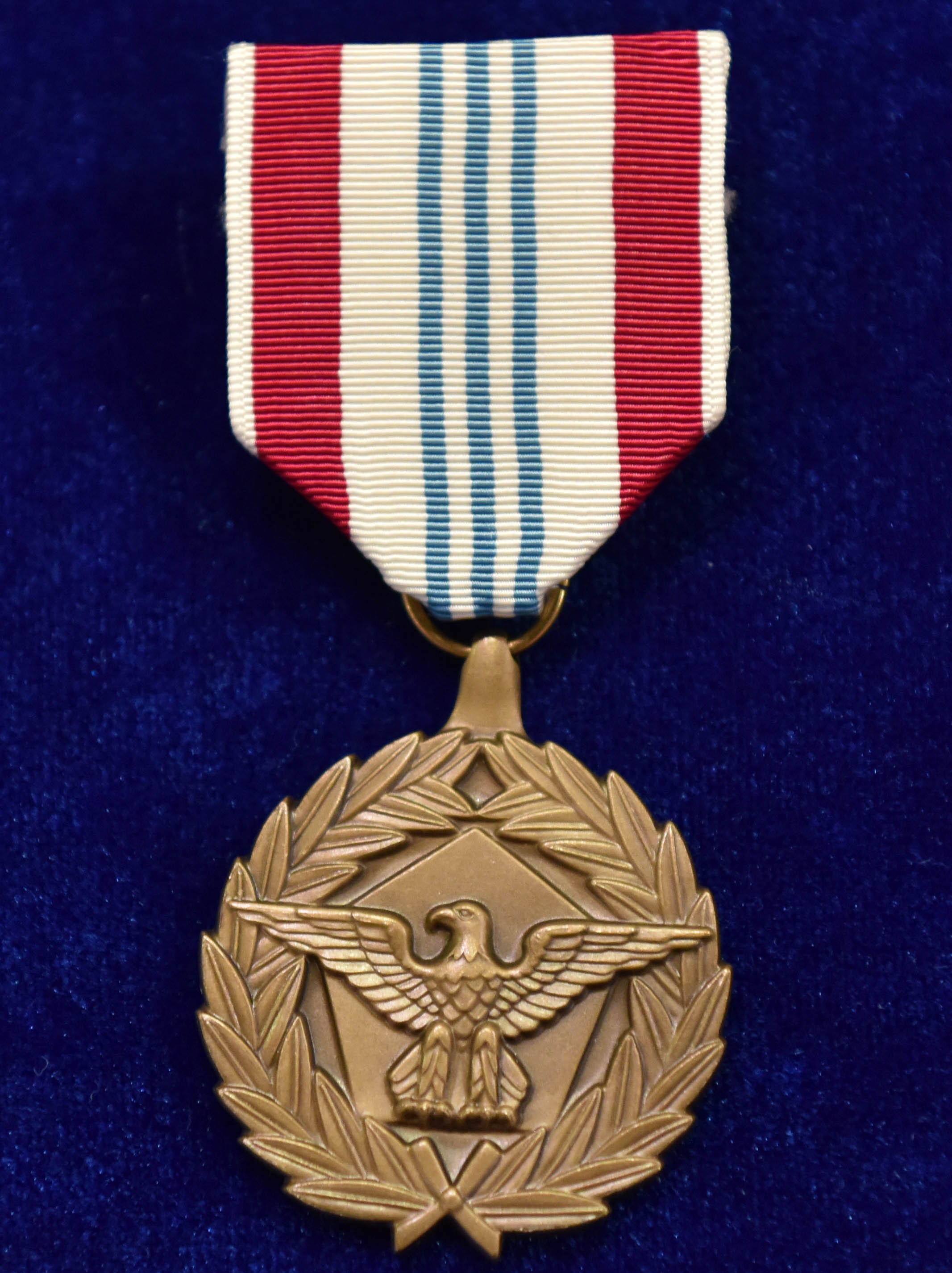
- Type: Military medal
- Awarded for: Non-combat outstanding achievement or meritorious service.
- Presented by: United States Department of Defense
- Eligibility: any member of the U.S. Armed Forces or any member of the armed forces of a friendly foreign nation
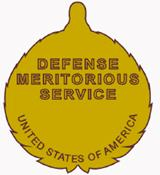
- Reverse
- Clasps: Oak leaf clusters for subsequent awards.
- Status: Currently awarded
- Established: Executive Order 12019, November 3, 1977. Amended by Executive Order 13666, April 18, 2014.
- Service ribbon

Precedence
- Next (higher): Purple Heart
- Next (lower): Meritorious Service Medal

The Defense Meritorious Service Medal (DMSM) is an award bestowed upon members of the United States military by the United States Department of Defense. In the order of precedence of the United States Armed Forces, it is worn between the Purple Heart and the Meritorious Service Medal. The medal is awarded in the name of the Secretary of Defense to members of the Armed Forces who, while serving in a joint activity, distinguish themselves by meritorious service, but not of a degree to warrant award of the Defense Superior Service Medal.

The medal is not the same as the Meritorious Service Medal, which is a separate federal military decoration. Both have virtually identical award criteria, but the DMSM is awarded to service members assigned to joint, multi-service organizations, while the MSM is awarded to service members in traditional military units within their respective individual services.

== Criteria ==
The medal was first created on 3 November 1977 by President Jimmy Carter under Executive Order 12019 to recognize non-combat meritorious achievement or service while serving in a joint assignment. The recognized service is typically for a period of time greater than 12 months, encompassing a recipient’s entire joint assignment, including extensions. The required achievement or service, is of a lesser degree than that required for award of the Defense Superior Service Medal, but must have been accomplished with distinction.

A joint assignment "connotes activities, operations, or organizations in which elements of more than one Armed Forces of the United States, as reflected in joint manpower documents or the Joint Duty Assignment List, perform joint missions under the auspices of the Office of the Secretary of Defense; the Chairman of the Joint Chiefs of Staff; or the commander of a Combatant Command". Service members assigned to or attached to a Joint Task Force as individuals, not members of a specific military service's unit, can be eligible for the DMSM. Members of service specific units are eligible for awards of personal decorations from their parent service. Personnel serving with jointly manned staffs within Allied Command Europe, Allied Command Atlantic, the NATO Military Committee, and military agencies associated with functions of the military or other joint activities as may be designated are also included.

In 2014, President Barack Obama with Executive Order 13666 extended eligibility of the DMSM to include any member of the armed forces of a friendly foreign nation, thus authorizing recognition of those NATO, Allied and Coalition officers and senior enlisted personnel assigned to/embedded in the Joint Staff, the Unified Combatant Commands and associated Joint Task Forces.

== Appearance ==
=== Medal description ===
The Defense Meritorious Service Medal is made of bronze and is 1 1/2 inches (38 mm) in diameter. The obverse design consists of a circular wreath of laurel leaves tied with a ribbon at base. In the center is a pentagon shape which slightly overlaps the wreath. Superimposed over the pentagon is an eagle with wings upraised standing at the base of the pentagon. The eagle is symbolic of the United States while the pentagon shape alludes to the Department of Defense, and the laurel wreath represents achievement. The reverse of the medal bears the inscription, Defense Meritorious Service in three horizontal lines while around the bottom are the words, United States of America. In between the inscriptions is space for engraving the name of the recipient.

=== Ribbon description ===
The ribbon for the medal is 1 3/8 inches (35 mm) in width composed of the following vertical stripes: White 1/16 inch (1.6 mm), Crimson 1/4 inch (6.4 mm), White 7/32 inch (5.6 mm), Bluebird 1/16 inch (1.6 mm), White 1/16 inch (1.6 mm), Bluebird 1/16 inch (1.6 mm), White 1/16 inch (1.6 mm), Bluebird 1/16 inch (1.6 mm), White 7/32 inch (5.6 mm), Crimson 1/4 inch (6.4 mm), White 1/16 inch (1.6 mm). The colors, crimson and white, are duplicates of the colors of the Legion of Merit ribbon. The stripes of blue (Bluebird) is the color associated with the Department of Defense.

Additional awards of the Defense Meritorious Service Medal are denoted by bronze oak leaf clusters, with a silver oak leaf cluster representing six awards. As a joint award, oak leaf clusters traditionally associated with Army, Air Force, and Space Force awards are also used for multiple awards of the DMSM to Navy, Marine Corps and Coast Guard personnel. These oak leaf clusters are attached to the suspension and service ribbons.

== See also ==
- Awards and decorations of the United States military
