= NATO Nuclear Planning Group =

Policymaking body within NATO

The Nuclear Planning Group
- Flag of NATO
- Formation: December 1966
- Headquarters: Brussels, Belgium
- Members: Albania; Belgium; Bulgaria; Canada; Croatia; Czech Republic; Denmark; Estonia; Finland; Germany; Greece; Hungary; Iceland; Italy; Latvia; Lithuania; Luxembourg; Montenegro; Netherlands; Norway; North Macedonia; Poland; Portugal; Romania; Slovakia; Slovenia; Spain; Sweden; Turkey; United Kingdom; United States
- Secretary General: Mark Rutte
- Website: Nuclear Planning Group Website

The Nuclear Planning Group was established in December 1966 to allow better communication, consultation and involvement among NATO member nations to deal with matters related to nuclear policy issues. During the period of the Cold War, NATO members recognized the need for incorporation of nuclear weapons as part of their defense strategy. Because of the lack of information sharing caused by restrictive US nuclear information sharing policy, many attempts were made to increase US–NATO communication and information sharing in relation to nuclear weapons such as the amendment of the Atomic Energy Act, the US–NATO Information Agreement, and the proposal of the Multilateral Force (MLF). Eventually, the Nuclear Planning Group was established as a finalized effort to deal with nuclear information sharing issues. There are three main levels to the Nuclear Planning Group. These are the ministerial level of the Nuclear Planning Group, the Permanent Representatives Group, and the Staff Group. In addition, the High-Level Group is a closely related organization that works in an advisory manner with the Nuclear Planning Group. Deliberations upon agenda topics will begin from the Staff Group level and eventually ascend to the ministerial level. The Nuclear Planning Group consists of all NATO members with the exception of France. Overall, the Nuclear Planning Group has created policy guidelines for nuclear-related topics while seeking to minimize the threat of nuclear conflict.

== Background ==
The Nuclear Planning Group was established in December 1966 in response to the growing tensions among NATO members on issues of nuclear information sharing which began in the early 1950s. In combination with the United States' mistrust in its NATO allies' abilities to contain nuclear information and the US Atomic Energy Act of 1946 which classified nuclear information as restricted data, there were many barriers to other NATO members' abilities to attain information. Consequently, the lack of transparency from the US caused other members to become concerned as to whether the US would support their NATO allies in the event of a general war, particularly in terms of US willingness to use nuclear weapons. Due to the lack of information on US nuclear capabilities, European members doubted their ability to defend themselves against the Soviet Union. Consequently, some felt they could be better suited in developing their own nuclear weapons rather than relying on the US.

== Development ==
As US officials began to see the inefficiencies in secrecy over nuclear information sharing in the early 1950s, they began initiatives for law, policy and system changes that broadened nuclear sharing capacity. The National Security Council developed NSC 151/2 which included policy to share information on nuclear weapons with particular NATO members. Towards the end of 1953, President Eisenhower called for an increase in sharing of nuclear technology for civilian purposes during his speech "Atoms for Peace" addressing the United Nations. The speech directly led to changes to the Atomic Energy Act of 1946 This act was later known as the Atomic Energy Act of 1954 and eased restrictions on nuclear information sharing. The development of the US-NATO Information Agreement also allowed for greater sharing of information.

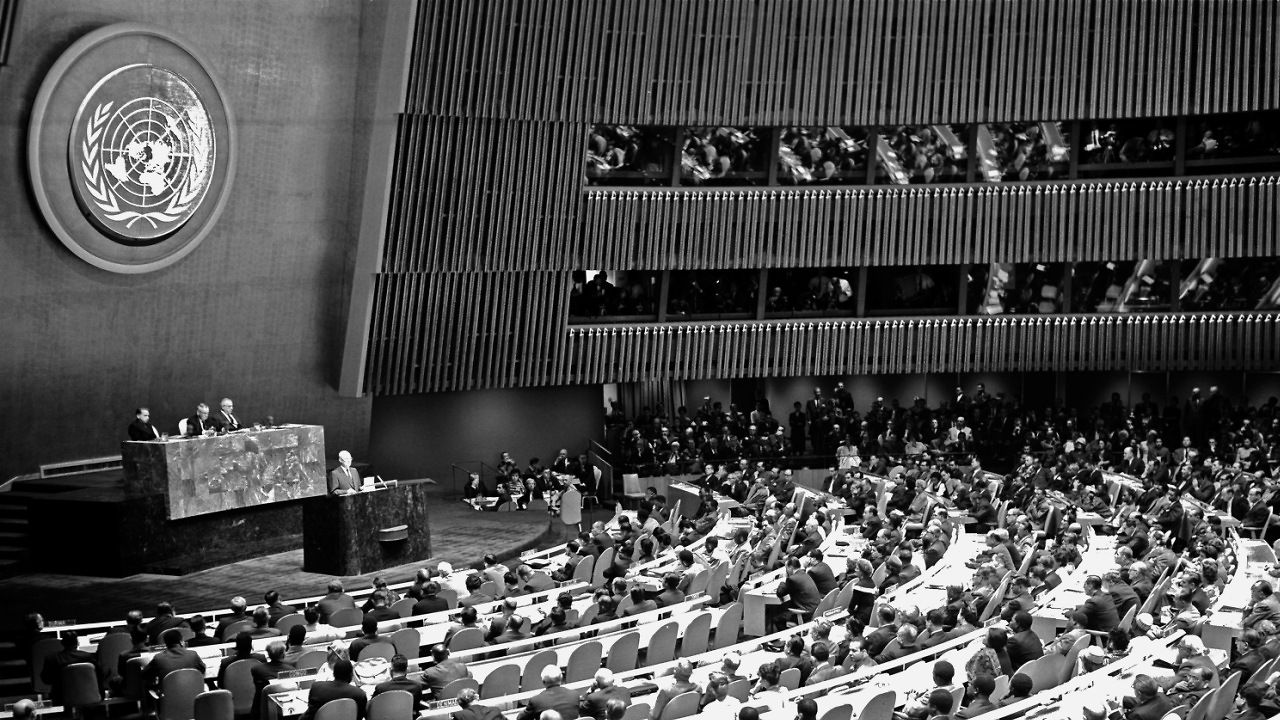
President Eisenhower delivering "Atoms for Peace" speech.

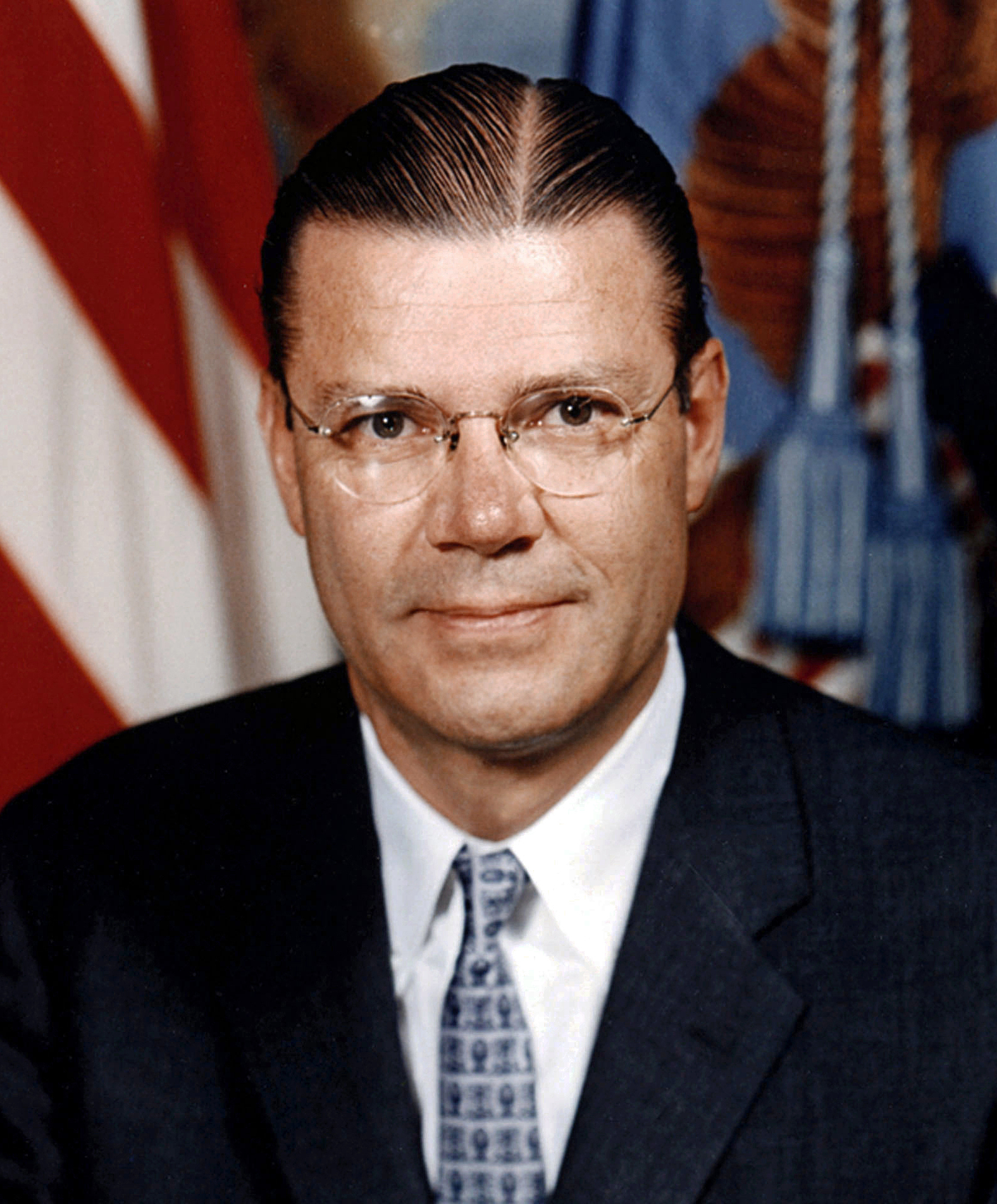
Robert McNamara, a major advocate for the development of the Nuclear Planning Group.

In addition to these policy changes, even more initiatives were taken to advance nuclear sharing. After the end of the Eisenhower administration in 1961, the idea of the Multilateral Force (MLF) was proposed by US officials which called for the sharing of nuclear weapons that would be assigned to NATO and controlled by NATO nations. The hope of this proposal was to combat the fear of shortfalls in medium-range ballistic missiles in Europe. During this period, West Germany was interested in the alliance's nuclear affairs and wanted to gain greater influence, but other NATO members feared that West Germany's complete control of nuclear weapons would antagonize European nations and the Soviet Union. The MLF would have provided nuclear weapons jointly controlled by all NATO members, and addressing this issue. Much of John F. Kennedy's administration advocated for the MLF and by December 1962, the groundwork for the system was established. Despite the Kennedy administration's advocacy for the MLF, this system was also met with much skepticism. The French president, Charles de Gaulle, rejected the proposal of the idea in January 1963 as he felt that France would not benefit from depending on the United States to supply them with nuclear weapons nor relying on the United States to control nuclear weapons. Britain also felt that it would not be beneficial to incur the extra cost of the new system for such insignificant benefits. Finally, West Germany's chancellor, Konrad Adenauer also doubted the effectiveness of the MLF. With such opposition, the MLF was never adopted.

The demise of the MLF proposal gave rise to the Nuclear Planning Group. US Secretary of Defense Robert McNamara saw the need for a different approach to nuclear sharing and supported a committee made up of NATO members. This would help with improving communication, consultation, and involvement among NATO members with the sharing of nuclear information instead of nuclear weapons as the MLF had proposed. McNamara helped to create a "select committee" of alliance members that would be set up at the ministerial level with the goal of facilitating more consultation and increasing member involvement on matters related to nuclear policy. This committee eventually grew into the "Special Committee on Nuclear Consultation" containing 10 Allied members. This committee was made up of a committee on crisis management, communication, and nuclear planning with the nuclear planning committee being the only committee organized at the ministerial level. The Nuclear Planning Committee consisted of the United States, United Kingdom, West Germany, Italy, and one representative from the other members. The first meeting of this committee in Washington, D.C., in February 1966 saw success in informing members of US nuclear plans, deterrence policies, and understanding of Soviet nuclear capabilities. Later that year, the Nuclear Planning Committee was further split into two sections. One section was the Nuclear Defense Affairs Committee and the other section was the Nuclear Planning Group.

== Structure ==
There are 3 main levels to the Nuclear Planning Group. At the top is the ministerial level. This level consists of defense ministers of the Nuclear Planning Group's members and is chaired by Mark Rutte, the Secretary General of NATO. At meetings they discuss issues involving nuclear planning, review and discuss work done by the lower levels of the Nuclear Planning Group, and consider future plans for the group. With regards to the military side of NATO, the Chairman of the NATO Military Committee often engages with the ministerial meetings. Additionally, the Supreme Allied Commander Europe (SACEUR) is welcomed at the ministerial meetings alongside the Supreme Allied Commander Atlantic (SACLANT) (previously, when it was still active).

Below them is the Permanent Representatives level which evidently involves the Permanent Representatives of NATO members. Their primary task is to deliberate over reports and findings that are to be later discussed at the ministerial level and to help prepare for the ministerial meetings. The Military Committee's Chairman can also be a participant at the Permanent Representatives meetings alongside 2-Star Officers of the International Military Staff.

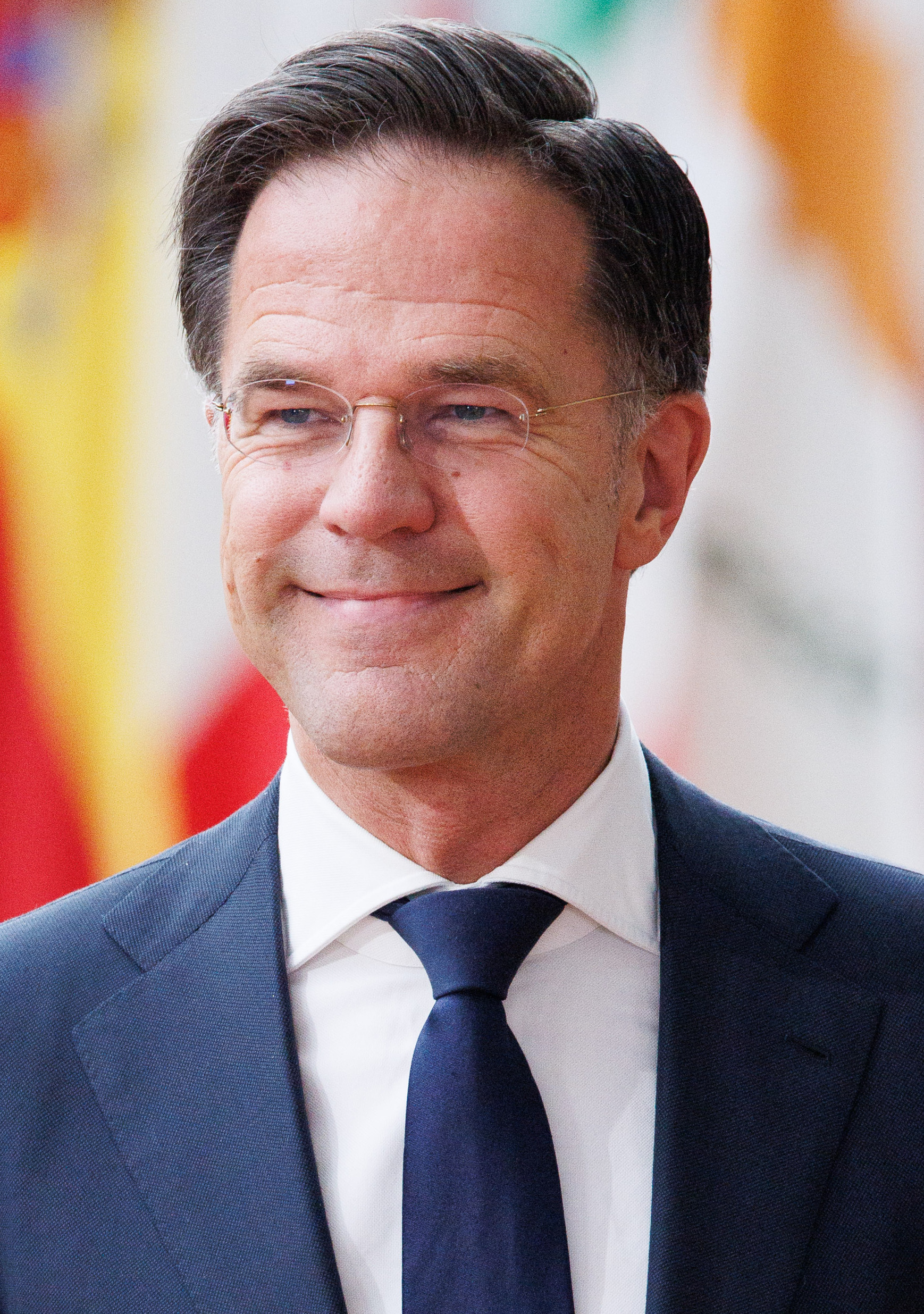
Mark Rutte, Secretary General and current chair of the Nuclear Planning Group.

Underneath the Permanent Representatives level is the Staff Group. This level involves members of the national delegations of member countries. Proposals and other items on the agenda for the Nuclear Planning Group discussions are deliberated upon here first. As such, this level is responsible for a majority of the documentational work at the Nuclear Planning Group. When a consensus is reached upon an agenda item, a report will be created for which the Permanent Representatives and ministerial levels can later discuss. The Staff Group is chaired by the Nuclear Planning Directorate. This directorate is composed of members of NATO's International Staff who are often experienced in regard to nuclear planning. The director has consistently been an American. From the military side, a member of the International Military Staff such as a naval captain or colonel will be involved in Staff Group sessions.

Although not directly part of the Nuclear Planning Group, the High Level Group is heavily associated with it. Established in 1977 and led by the United States, this group involves meetings of high-ranking officials from the capitals of NATO members. The High Level Group was created due to several American concerns. This included handling the issue of the Soviet Union's new nuclear systems at the time. The United States was also concerned of the capacity of the North Atlantic Council to handle important nuclear decisions during the Cold War period. Another reason why the United States wanted to create the High Level Group was in order to have the senior officials of the NATO members’ capitals be more involved in nuclear discussion. The High Level Group remains an advisory organization to the Nuclear Planning Group regarding nuclear planning and policymaking, and is also engaged in discussions involving nuclear weapons security and safety. Reports of discussions are created and given to the defense ministers, who are involved in the ministerial level of the Nuclear Planning Group.

== Membership ==
Currently, all the members of NATO are also members of the Nuclear Planning Group apart from France. These countries are Albania, Belgium, Bulgaria, Canada, Croatia, the Czech Republic, Denmark, Estonia, Finland, Germany, Greece, Hungary, Iceland, Italy, Latvia, Lithuania, Luxembourg, Montenegro, the Netherlands, North Macedonia, Norway, Poland, Portugal, Romania, Slovakia, Slovenia, Spain, Sweden, Turkey, the United Kingdom and the United States. In the 2008 French White Paper on Defense and National Security, France argued that its nuclear forces are completely independent and will not participate in the group. For that reason, France is not an official member of the Nuclear Planning Group.

Historically, meetings of the Nuclear Planning Group would involve four permanent members (United Kingdom, United States, Italy, and West Germany) and a rotating group of non-permanent members. However, this rotational structure was terminated in November 1979.

== Initiatives ==
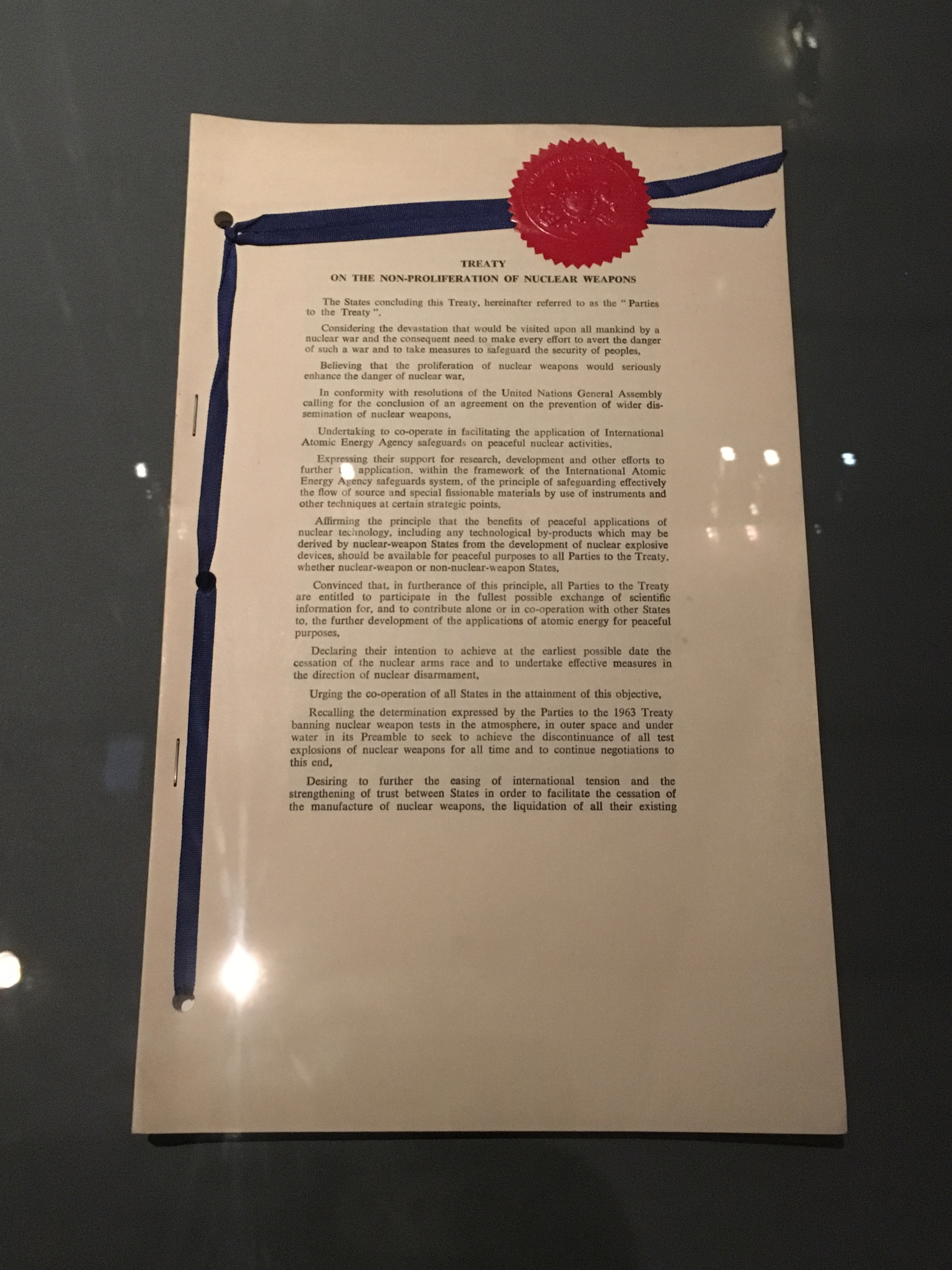
Non-Proliferation Treaty (1968)

In its early years, the Nuclear Planning Group focused on solving two major problems: Atomic Demolition Munitions (ADMS) and Theatre Nuclear Forces (TNF). ADMS are nuclear land mines that were thought to be effective for limiting collateral damage meanwhile TNFs was a method to store nuclear weapons in Europe for preparation for a nuclear war. The concept of ADMS has been argued by some scholars like Thomas Legge as controversial, due to how it would have to be deployed at the early stages of a conflict in order for it to be effective. At the same time, the Nuclear Planning Group continued to show interest in ADMS as they believed that it was a favourable defensive strategy. After a lot of research and discussion, the Nuclear Planning Group deemed ADMs to be under the same classification of Tactical Nuclear Weapons which meant maintaining a high sense of caution before deploying the weapons. Another prominent issue that the Nuclear Planning Group faced was how the Soviet Union was building their military power including nuclear weapons. In October 1977, the Nuclear Planning Group met to discuss the need for theatre nuclear forces as a response to Soviet pressures. The term theatre nuclear forces (TNF) essentially means any use of nuclear weapons against the United States or their Allies overseas. TNF originally stemmed from the 1953 decision of the Eisenhower administration to deploy nuclear weapons in Europe for tactical use and store it there as well. Due to the supply of American nuclear weapons in Europe, the Nuclear Planning Group had to consider the ramifications through several meetings between the US and Germans from 1969 to 1970. Through the meetings, a study was created and highlighted concerns about decoupling and also general questioning of the necessity of the TNW reserves. Eventually, the paper influenced the Nuclear Planning Group to limit the use of TNF due to the many unknowns that could worsen a nuclear war.

In more recent times, the Nuclear Planning Group upholds the norms of the Non-Proliferation Treaty which was signed on August 5, 1963, and was officially ratified by all NATO alliance members except for France in the 1970s. As the main intention of the Non-proliferation treaty is to limit access to nuclear weapons, the Nuclear Planning Group recommends policies to further that agenda. On a bi-annual basis, Nuclear Planning Group members meet to deliberate hot nuclear issues, tactical nuclear weapons doctrine, and various new nuclear munitions. The main focus of the meetings is to advocate for nuclear deterrence efforts rather than defense through consultation. Additionally, the Nuclear Planning Group has five goals: to increase knowledge about nuclear weapon issues for Alliance members, act as a pressure relief valve for tense nuclear issues, create policy guidelines, address the nuclear sharing dilemma, and provide informal privileges for high-level political-military consultation. Overall there is little information disclosed to the public regarding the Nuclear Planning Group's current initiatives due to the sensitivity of nuclear weapons.

== Impacts ==
Public opinion on the efficacy of the Nuclear Planning Group is quite mixed and polarized due to the sensitive nature of nuclear discussions. Despite that, the Nuclear Planning Group has included non-nuclear powers in the NATO alliance to contribute regarding nuclear matters. Scholar Robert Krone argues that considering both political and military inter-groups within NATO has allowed the Nuclear Planning Group to achieve consensus through incremental changes. Additionally, outside of the organization, the Nuclear Planning Group has maintained its presence without the worry of political action from non-alliance members. Through the strategic connection with the non-proliferation treaty, the planning group was able to be active without threatening the Soviets to take nuclear action. Alternatively there are also many criticisms of the Nuclear Planning Group as well. For example, it has been criticized for the lack of political willpower as it is difficult to evaluate the efficacy of the group without tangible results. In addition, the influence of the United States within the group is controversial. Depending on the point of view regarding nuclear weapons, the opinions of the Nuclear Planning Group differ but according to many, the existence of the group is a deterrent to nuclear weapons within itself.
