= Charles Spofford =

United States Army general

Spofford circa 1946

Charles Merville Spofford CBE (November 17, 1902 – March 23, 1991) was an American lawyer who held posts in NATO and on the boards of numerous arts organizations.

== Biography ==
Charles Merville Spofford was born November 17, 1902, in St. Louis, the son of Charles W. Spofford and the former Beulah Merville, and grew up in Evanston, Illinois. He graduated Phi Beta Kappa from Yale University in 1924, where he was a member of Skull and Bones, and Harvard Law School in 1928. He married Margaret Mercer Walker on March 22, 1930, with whom he had four children.

He joined the New York law firm Davis Polk & Wardwell in 1930 and became a partner in 1940, retiring in 1973 after 33 years. He proposed to John D. Rockefeller III what would become the Lincoln Center for the Performing Arts in 1956 and served as president of the Metropolitan Opera Association from 1946 to 1950.

== Military and NATO ==
He served in the US Army during World War II, rising to the rank of brigadier general. With his financial background and experience as a lawyer, along with his ability to speak French, he was assigned to Allied Force Headquarters in Algiers as an advisor on economic and supply issues. In 1943, he became Chief of Staff of the Allied Military Government and Deputy Chief of Civil Affairs for Sicily and Italy. In 1944, he was named Assistant Chief of Staff for Military Government for the whole Mediterranean theater. Wallace Deuel, a reporter for the St. Louis Post-Dispatch, remarked that he had to deal with "some of the most flamboyantly temperamental men of a dozen nationalities the world has ever seen; General George Patton, Field Marshal Bernard Montgomery and General Charles de Gaulle, just to name a few examples, and he got excellent results". He earned the Purple Heart, Distinguished Service Medal, Legion of Honor, Croix de Guerre and Order of the British Empire.

From 1950 to 1952 he served in NATO as a deputy US representative to the North Atlantic Council and later he was chair of the Council of Deputies and chair of the European Coordinating Committee.
