= Tormod Cappelen Endresen =

Norwegian lawyer and diplomat

His Excellency Tormod Cappelen Endresen
- Born: 10 December 1966 (age 59); Norway
- Education: University of Oslo
- Term: September 2012 – August 2017
- Spouse: Elisabeth Lothe
- Children: 4
- Awards: Royal Norwegian Order of Merit

Tormod C. Endresen (born December 10, 1966) is a Norwegian lawyer and diplomat. From 2012 till 2017, he served as Norway's ambassador to Singapore.

== Education and career ==
Tormod C. Endresen holds a Law Degree (Candidate of Law) from University of Oslo. From 2008 to 2012, Endresen established and led Norway's Consulate General in Guangzhou, China. In 2012, he was appointed as Norway's ambassador to Singapore. Previously, Endresen served as Second Secretary to Norway's Mission to the United Nations in New York and as Deputy Director General at the Norwegian Ministry of Foreign Affairs. Endresen practiced law at Oslo law firm Wiersholm from 2001 to 2003. He has served as Governor of the Board of the Asia Europe Foundation and as Alternate Board Member of the Extractive Industries Transparency Initiative (EITI).

== Ambassador to Singapore ==
Endresen was confirmed as Norway's Ambassador to Singapore in 2012 and presented his credentials to Singapore's president Tony Tan on September 20 that year. He was succeeded by Anita Nergaard in 2017.

== Distinctions and awards ==
In 2013, Endresen was awarded Commander of the Royal Norwegian Order of Merit by His Majesty Harald V of Norway. In 2015, the Confederation of Norwegian Enterprise (NHO) named Endresen “Ambassador of the year” for his work to promote Norwegian interests.

== Personal life ==
Endresen has four children and is married to Elisabeth Lothe, a Norwegian career diplomat.
