= Defence Planning Committee (NATO) =

Former NATO military decision-making body

The Defence Planning Committee was a former senior decision-making body on matters relating to the integrated military structure of NATO. It was dissolved following a major committee review in June 2010 and its responsibilities absorbed by the North Atlantic Council. and the Defence Policy and Planning Committee (DPPC).

== Highlights ==
The Defence Planning Committee (DPC) was the ultimate authority on all questions related to the NATO Military Command Structure. It was formed following a North Atlantic Council Ministerial meeting in Ottawa in May 1963. The DPC met for the first time on October 10, 1963 to prepare a Defence review.

The DPC provided guidance to NATO's military authorities and oversaw the force planning process. Following the withdrawal of France from the integrated military command, the DPC was delegated greater mandate over the integrated military command, and gained the same level of authority as the North Atlantic Council (NAC) and the Nuclear Planning Group on matters within its competence. When it was dissolved in 2010, its responsibilities were absorbed by the NAC. It provided guidance to NATO's military authorities and oversaw the force planning process. The force planning process identified NATO's military requirements, set planning targets for individual countries to contribute to those requirements, and assessed the extent to which members met those targets and provided other forces and capabilities to the Alliance.

Momentarily, just before being dissolved, all member countries were represented on the DPC. However, between 1966 and April 2009, France was not represented on this committee as a consequence of its withdrawal from the Military Command Structure. France announced their return to full participation at the 2009 Strasbourg/ Kehl Summit.
