= International Military Staff =

Advisory and executive body of NATO's Military Committee

- Coat of arms
- Founded: 1967
- Allegiance: NATO
- Type: Military staff
- Role: Provides strategic advice and executive support to the NATO Military Committee.
- Size: 500+ personnel
- Part of: NATO HQ
- Location: NATO HQ, Brussels, Belgium
- Website: nato.int

Commanders
- Secretary General: Mark Rutte
- Director General: LTG Remigijus Baltrėnas; Lithuanian Armed Forces

Insignia
- Flag

The International Military Staff (abbr. IMS) is an advisory and executive body of the North Atlantic Treaty Organisation's (NATO) Military Committee (MC), which in turn supports the North Atlantic Council (NAC). Based in NATO's headquarters in Brussels, Belgium, the IMS has four divisions and additional entities integrated with NATO's civilian International Staff (IS). It has approximately 500 staff, mostly seconded from NATO member states and is led by a Director General.

== Divisions ==
The IMS consists of the following divisions:

- Operations and Plans (O&P)
- Policy and Capabilities (P&C)
- Cooperative Security (CS)
- Logistics and Resources (L&R)

The following integrated entities at the NATO headquarters are jointly run by the IS and the IMS:

- Joint Intelligence and Security Division (JISD)
- NATO Standardization Office (NSO)
- NATO Digital Staff (NDS)
- NATO Situation Centre (SITCEN)

== See also ==
- Structure of NATO
- European Union Military Staff
