= Anita Nergaard =

Norwegian diplomat (born 1967)

Her Excellency Anita Nergaard
- Born: December 16, 1967 (age 58)
- Education: Norwegian School of Economics
- Occupation: Diplomat
- Term: 2017–2021
- Awards: Royal Norwegian Order of Merit

Anita Nergaard (born December 16, 1967) is a Norwegian diplomat. She served as the Norwegian ambassador to Singapore from 2017 to 2021.

== Early life ==
Nergaard was born on December 16, 1967, in Sámi, and grew up in Karasjok Municipality. She earned a bachelor's degree in economics from the Norwegian School of Economics in Bergen in 1990. There she also received a master's degree in economics and her doctorate in 1993. From 1993 to 1995, she worked for the central bank of Norway, Norges Bank.

== Diplomatic career ==
Nergaard has been in the diplomatic service since 1995. She had her first foreign assignment from 1997 to 2000 as second secretary at the Norwegian embassy in Ankara, and then as first secretary at the Norwegian NATO delegation in Brussels. In 2005, she became a department head at the Norwegian Ministry of Foreign Affairs, first in the department for security policy, then in the departments for global security issues and crisis management, and the Commonwealth of Independent States, and from 2010 to 2012 in the department for Russia, Eurasia, and regional cooperation. From 2012 to 2017, she was the deputy representative to Norway's permanent mission to NATO in Brussels.

From 2017 to 2021, Nergaard was the Norwegian ambassador to Singapore, succeeding Tormod Cappelen Endresen. She was accredited there by President Halimah Yacob on October 25, 2017.

== Orders and awards ==
- August 20, 2018: Knight 1st Class of the Royal Norwegian Order of Merit
