= Andrej Benedejčič =

Slovenian diplomat

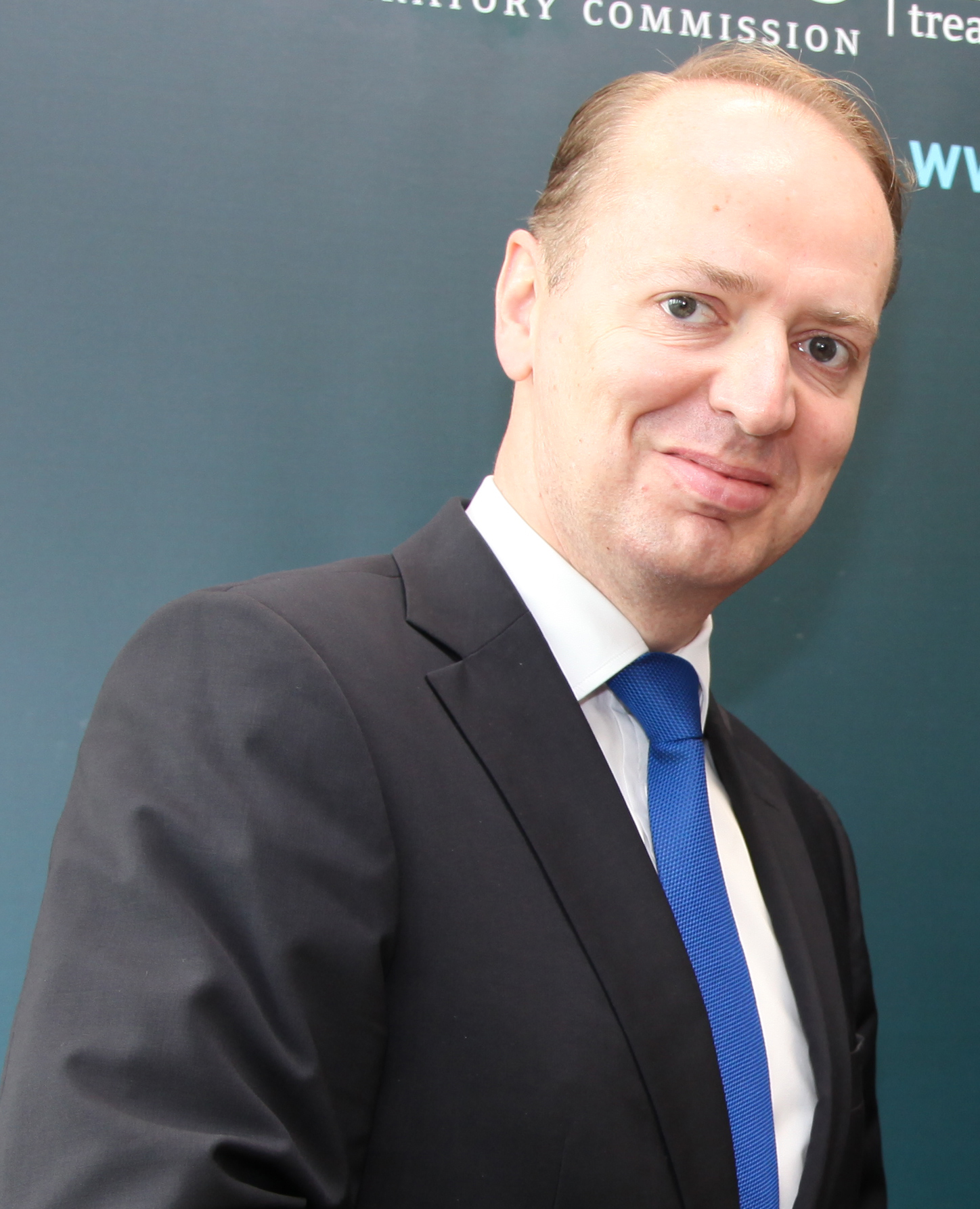
Andrej Benedejčič in 2015

Andrej Benedejčič (born November 21, 1970, in Ljubljana) is a Slovenian diplomat, currently serving as the Permanent Representative of the Republic of Slovenia to NATO.

== Biography ==
From 2011 to 2015 he was the Ambassador Extraordinary and Plenipotentiary of the Republic of Slovenia on the Council of the North Atlantic Treaty Organization in Brussels.

He was Director-General at the Ministry of Foreign Affairs of the Republic of Slovenia, responsible for multilateral political relations and global issues from 2009 to 2011.

From 2005 to 2008 he was the Ambassador Extraordinary and Plenipotentiary of the Republic of Slovenia to the Russian Federation in Moscow.

He was foreign policy advisor to the Prime Minister of Slovenia from 2001 to 2002 and to the President of Slovenia from 2003 to 2004.

From 1998 to 1999 he was a member of the Permanent Mission of the Republic of Slovenia to the United Nations, serving as Alternate Representative in the United Nations Security Council.

His wife's name is Minca and they have a daughter, Živa, born in August 2006 in Moscow. His cousin is the Slovenian football midfielder Igor Benedejčič.

He was awarded the Cyril and Methodius Prize by Patriarch Alexius II of the Russian Orthodox Church.

From 2005 to 2008, he also served as Slovenia's non-resident ambassador to Belarus, Kazakhstan, Kyrgyzstan, Tajikistan, Turkmenistan and Uzbekistan. He graduated from Harvard University with a BA in economics.
