= North Atlantic Council =

NATO's political body

Type
- Type: Committee of the NATO

History
- Founded: 4 April 1949; 77 years ago

Leadership
- Secretary General: Mark Rutte
- Deputy Secretary-General: Radmila Šekerinska

Structure
- Seats: 32 states: Albania; Belgium; Bulgaria; Canada; Croatia; Czech Republic; Denmark; Estonia; Finland; France; Germany; Greece; Hungary; Iceland; Italy; Latvia; Lithuania; Luxembourg; Montenegro; Netherlands; North Macedonia; Norway; Poland; Portugal; Romania; Slovakia; Slovenia; Spain; Sweden; Turkey; United Kingdom; United States
- Joint committees: 20 reporting to NAC: Deputies Committee; Political Committee; Partnerships and Cooperative Security Committee; Defence Policy and Planning Committee; Committee on Proliferation; Digital Policy Committee; Operations Policy Committee; High Level Task Force on Conventional Arms Control; Verification Coordinating Committee; Conference of National Armaments Directors; Committee for Standardization; Logistics Committee; Resource Policy and Planning Board; Integrated Air and Missile Defence Policy Committee; Aviation Committee; Resilience Committee; Committee on Public Diplomacy; Council Operations and Exercises Committee; Security Committee; Civilian Intelligence Committee; Archives Committee
- Authority: Principal political decision-making body

Meeting place
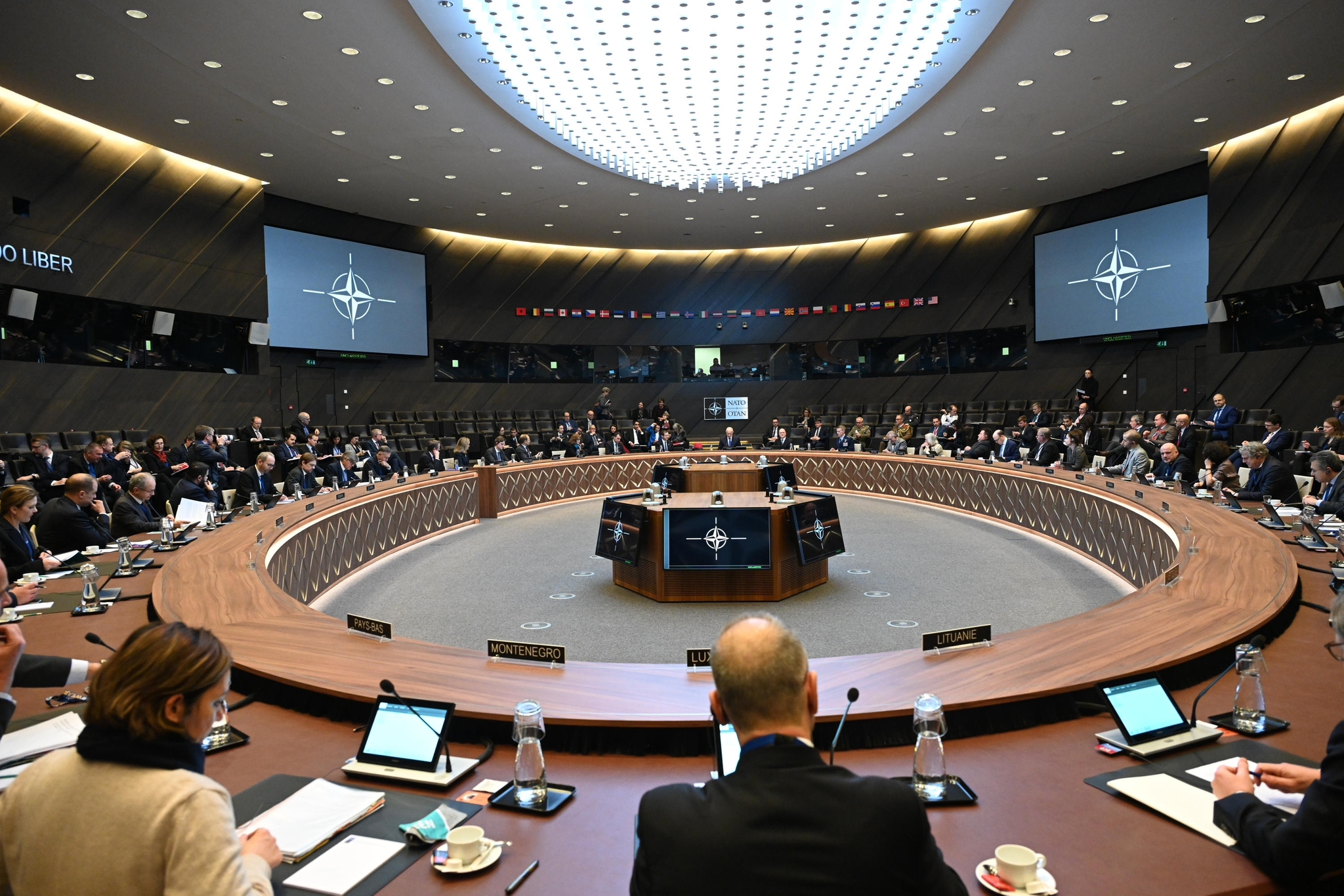
- NATO headquarters Brussels, Belgium

Website
- www.nato.int/

Footnotes
- Historical meeting venues: Palais de Chaillot (April 1952-December 1959); Quartier de la Porte-Dauphine, Paris (December 1959-1967)

The North Atlantic Council (abbr. NAC, French: Conseil de l'Atlantique nord) is the principal political decision-making body of the North Atlantic Treaty Organization (NATO), consisting of permanent representatives of its member countries. Its existence is mandated by Article 9 of the North Atlantic Treaty and it was established as a result. It is the only body in NATO that derives its authority explicitly from the treaty.

== Powers and duties ==
The North Atlantic Treaty gave the NAC the power to set up subsidiary bodies for various policy functions, including a defense committee to implement other parts of the treaty. Since 1952, the NAC has been in permanent session. The NAC can be held at the Permanent Representative Level (PermReps), or can be composed of member states' Ministers of State, Defense, or Heads of Government. The NAC has the same powers regardless of the formation under which it meets. The NAC meets twice a week: every Tuesday, for an informal lunch discussion; and every Wednesday for a decision-taking session. Usually, meetings occur amongst the permanent representatives who are the senior permanent member of each delegation and is generally a senior civil servant or an experienced ambassador (and holding that diplomatic rank). The list of permanent representatives may be found on the NATO website.

The 32 members of NATO have diplomatic missions to the organization through embassies in Belgium. The meetings of the NAC are chaired by the secretary general and, when decisions have to be made, action is agreed upon on the basis of unanimity and common accord. There is no voting or decision by majority. Each nation represented at the NAC table or on any of its subordinate committees retains complete sovereignty and responsibility for its own decisions.

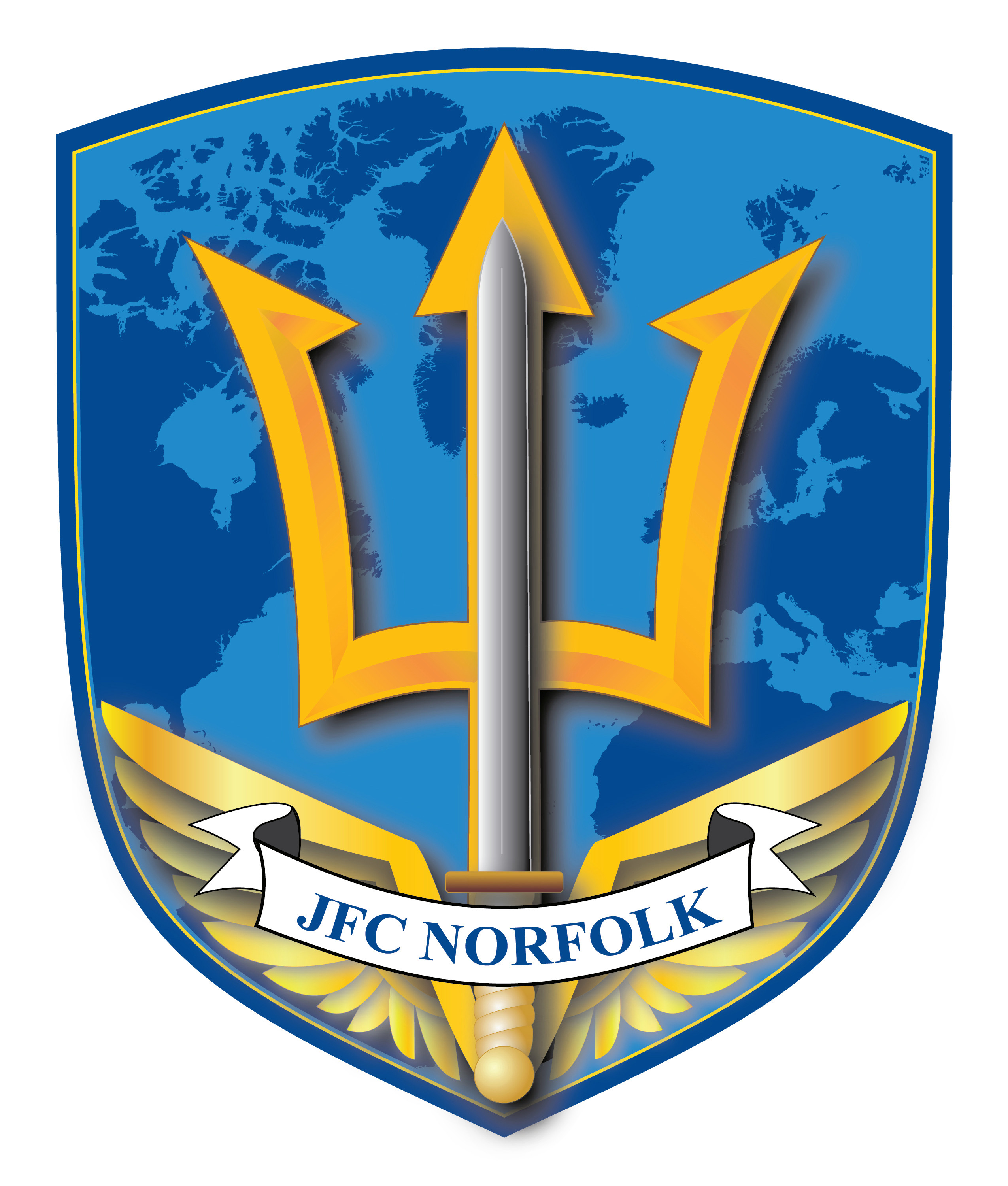
POLITICAL-STRATEGIC LEVEL: | North Atlantic Council (NAC); NATO Headquarters, Brussels, BEL
Secretary-General (SECGEN); NATO Headquarters, Brussels, BEL | International Staff (IS); NATO Headquarters, Brussels, BEL
MILITARY-STRATEGIC LEVEL:
International Military Staff (IMS); NATO Headquarters, Brussels, BEL | Military Committee (MC); NATO Headquarters, Brussels, BEL
STRATEGIC COMMANDS:
Supreme Allied Commander Transformation; Allied Command Transformation (ACT); Norfolk, U.S. | Supreme Allied Commander Europe; Allied Command Operations (ACO); Mons, BEL
TRANSFORMATION COMMANDS: | OPERATIONAL COMMANDS:
Joint Warfare Centre (JWC); Stavanger, NOR | Joint Force Command Brunssum (JFC Brunssum); Brunssum, NLD | Allied Air Command (AIRCOM); Ramstein, DEU
Joint Force Training Centre (JFTC); Bydgoszcz, POL | Joint Force Command Naples (JFC Naples); Naples, ITA | Allied Land Command (LANDCOM); İzmir, TUR
Joint Analysis and Lessons Learned Centre (JALLC); Lisbon, PRT | Joint Force Command Norfolk (JFC Norfolk); Norfolk, Virginia, U.S. | Allied Maritime Command (MARCOM); Northwood, GBR
Joint Support and Enabling Command (JSEC); Ulm, DEU

== Composition ==
Each member nation is normally represented on the North Atlantic Council by an Ambassador or Permanent Representative supported by a national delegation composed of advisers and officials who represent their country on different NATO committees.

North Atlantic Council
| Portrait | Name | Country | Incumbent since |
|---|---|---|---|
| | Ilir Gjoni | Albania | September 2023 |
| | Ariadne Petridis | Belgium | 16 August 2022 |
| | Nikolay Milkov | Bulgaria | 10 May 2023 |
| | Heidi Hulan | Canada | 6 June 2024 |
| | Mario Nobilo | Croatia | 5 September 2017 |
| | David Konecký | Czech Republic | 31 July 2024 |
| | Lone Dencker Wisborg | Denmark | 2 September 2022 |
| | Jüri Luik | Estonia | 2 September 2022 |
| | Piritta Asunmaa | Finland | September 2023 |
| | David Cvach | France | August 2024 |
| | Géza Andreas von Geyr | Germany | August 2023 |
| | Vasiliki Gounari | Greece | |
| | István Balogh | Hungary | 25 January 2023 |
| | Hermann Ingólfsson | Iceland | 15 December 2021 |
| | Marco Peronaci | Italy | |
| | Māris Riekstiņš | Latvia | 1 September 2023 |
| | Darius Jauniškis | Lithuania | 18 April 2025 |
| | Stephan Frédéric Müller | Luxembourg | 15 December 2021 |
| | Milena Kalezić | Montenegro | November 2023 |
| | Thijs van der Plas | Netherlands | 8 August 2022 |
| | Dane Taleski | North Macedonia | |
| | Anita Nergaard | Norway | September 2022 |
| | Jacek Najder | Poland | 2025 |
| | Pedro Costa Pereira | Portugal | 9 December 2019 |
| | Dan Neculăescu | Romania | February 2022 |
| | Peter Bátor | Slovakia | 8 February 2021 |
| | Andrej Benedejčič | Slovenia | 24 November 2023 |
| | Federico Torres Muro | Spain | 24 November 2022 |
| | Jan Knutsson | Sweden | 25 August 2024 |
| | Basat Öztürk | Turkey | 29 May 2025 |
| | Angus Lapsley | United Kingdom | April 2025 |
| | Matthew Whitaker | United States | 25 April 2025 |

== See also ==
- Secretary General of NATO
- NATO Military Committee
  - International Military Staff
