= NATO Military Committee =

Body of NATO composed of member states' Chiefs of Defence

- Location: Brussels, Belgium
- Website: NATO.int

Commanders
- Secretary General: Mark Rutte
- Chair: Admiral Giuseppe Cavo Dragone
- Deputy Chair: Lieutenant General Winston P. Brooks Jr.
- Director General of the International Military Staff: Lieutenant General Remigijus Baltrėnas

Insignia
- Chair's arms

- Deputy Chair's arms

- International Military Staff's arms

- International Military Staff's flag

The North Atlantic Treaty Organization's (NATO) Military Committee (abbr. MC) is the body that is composed of member states' chiefs of defence (CHOD). These national CHODs are regularly represented in the MC by their permanent Military Representatives (MilRep), who often are officers of the rank of general and admiral. Like the Council, from time to time the Military Committee also meets at a higher level, namely at the level of Chiefs of Defence, the most senior military officer in each nation's armed forces.

== Role ==
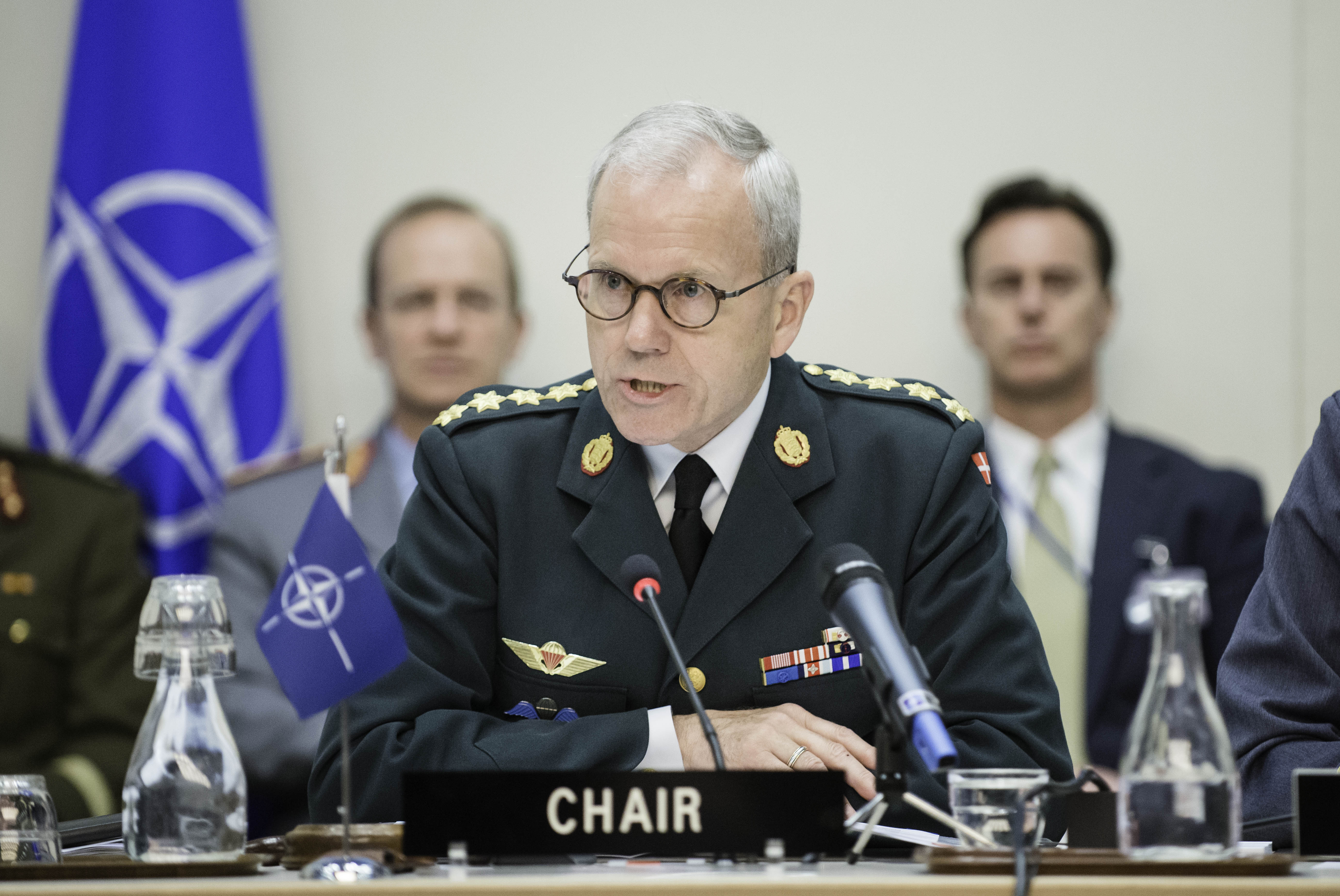
Chairman in 2014, General Knud Bartels

The MC assists and advises the North Atlantic Council (NAC), Defence Planning Committee (DPC), and Nuclear Planning Group (NPG) on military matters including policy and strategy. Its principal role is to provide direction and advice on military policy and strategy. It provides guidance on military matters to the Supreme Allied Commanders of Allied Command Operations and Allied Command Transformation, whose representatives attend its meetings, and is responsible for the overall conduct of the military affairs of the Alliance under the authority of the Council. The executive body of the MC is the International Military Staff (IMS).

== Current NATO Chiefs of Defence ==
| Country | CHOD | Military Branch | Took Office |
|---|---|---|---|
| Albania; Member since 1 April 2009 | Lieutenant General Arben Kingji; Chief of the General Staff | Land Forces | 3 August 2022 |
| Belgium; Member since 24 August 1949 | General Frederik Vansina; Chief of Defence | Air Force | 4 July 2025 |
| Bulgaria; Member since 29 March 2004 | Admiral Emil Eftimov; Chief of Defence | Navy | 30 March 2020 |
| Canada; Member since 24 August 1949 | General Jennie Carignan; Chief of the Defence Staff | Army | 28 June 2024 |
| Croatia; Member since 1 April 2009 | Colonel General Tihomir Kundid; Chief of the General Staff | Army | 8 March 2024 |
| Czech Republic; Member since 12 March 1999 | Lieutenant General Miroslav Hlavac Chief of the General Staff | Land Forces | 1 July 2026 |
| Denmark; Member since 24 August 1949 | General Michael Hyldgaard; Chief of Defence | Royal Army | 1 June 2025 |
| Estonia; Member since 29 March 2004 | Lieutenant General Andrus Merilo; Commander of the Defence Forces | Land Forces | 1 July 2024 |
| Finland; Member since 4 April 2023 | General Janne Jaakkola; Chief of Defence | Army | 1 April 2024 |
| France; Member since 24 August 1949 (Note: Excluded from the Committee in 1966–2008.) | General Fabien Mandon; Chief of the Defence Staff | Air and Space Force | 1 September 2025 |
| Germany; Member since 6 May 1955 (Note: As West Germany. East Germany became part of NATO after German reunification on 3 October 1990) | General Carsten Breuer; Inspector General of the Bundeswehr | Army | 23 March 2023 |
| Greece; Member since 18 February 1952 | General Dimitrios Choupis; Chief of the National Defence General Staff | Army | 12 January 2024 |
| Hungary; Member since 12 March 1999 | Colonel General Sándor Zsolt Chief of the General Staff | Ground Forces | 1 June 2026 |
| Iceland; Member since 24 August 1949 | Jónas G. Allansson; Director of the Security and Defence Department | —N/a | 2022 |
| Italy; Member since 24 August 1949 | General Luciano Portolano; Chief of the Defence Staff | Army | 4 October 2024 |
| Latvia; Member since 29 March 2004 | Major General Kaspars Pudāns; Commander of the Joint Headquarters | National Guard | 21 November 2024 |
| Lithuania; Member since 29 March 2004 | General Raimundas Vaikšnoras; Chief of Defence | Land Forces | 24 July 2024 |
| Luxembourg; Member since 24 August 1949 | General Steve Thull; Chief of Defence | Army | 29 September 2020 |
| Montenegro; Member since 5 June 2017 | Brigadier General Miodrag Vuksanović; Chief of the General Staff | Ground Army | 3 June 2025 |
| Netherlands; Member since 24 August 1949 | General Onno Eichelsheim; Chief of Defence | Royal Air and Space Force | 15 April 2021 |
| North Macedonia; Member since 27 March 2020 | Major General Saško Lafčiski; Chief of the General Staff | Ground Forces | 18 August 2024 |
| Norway; Member since 24 August 1949 | General Eirik Kristoffersen; Chief of Defence | Army | 17 August 2020 |
| Poland; Member since 12 March 1999 | General Wiesław Kukuła; Chief of the General Staff | Territorial Defence Force | 10 October 2023 |
| Portugal; Member since 24 August 1949 | General João Cartaxo Alves; Chief of the General Staff | Army | 28 February 2026 |
| Romania; Member since 29 March 2004 | General Gheorghiță Vlad; Chief of the General Staff | Land Forces | 30 November 2023 |
| Slovakia | General Miroslav Lorinc; Chief of the General Staff | Air Force | 7 May 2026 |
| Slovenia | Major General Boštjan Močnik; Chief of the General Staff | Ground Force | 15 December 2025 |
| Spain; Member since 30 May 1982 | Admiral General Teodoro Esteban López Calderón; Chief of the Defence Staff | Navy | 27 January 2021 |
| Sweden; Member since 7 March 2024 | General Michael Claesson; Chief of Defence | Army | 1 October 2024 |
| Turkey; Member since 18 February 1952 | General Selçuk Bayraktaroğlu; Chief of the General Staff | Land Forces | 5 August 2025 |
| United Kingdom; Member since 24 August 1949 | Air Chief Marshal Sir Richard Knighton; Chief of the Defence Staff | Royal Air Force | 27 June 2025 |
| United States; Member since 24 August 1949 | General Dan Caine; Chairman of the Joint Chiefs of Staff | Air Force | 11 April 2025 |

== History ==
Until 2008 the Military Committee excluded France, due to that country's 1966 decision to remove itself from NATO's integrated military structure, which it rejoined in 1995. Until France rejoined NATO, it was not represented on the Defence Planning Committee, and this led to conflicts between it and NATO members. Such was the case in the lead up to Operation Iraqi Freedom.

Established in 1949 during the first Council session in Washington, the Military Committee is NATO's highest military authority and advises the NAC and NATO's strategic commanders, the Supreme Allied Commander Transformation and the Supreme Allied Commander Europe.

Arms of historical NATO commands

Allied Command Atlantic

Allied Command Channel

Allied Command Europe (Supreme Headquarters)

== See also ==
- Structure of NATO
- International Military Staff
- Chairman of the NATO Military Committee
- European Union Military Committee
