= Exercise Mainbrace =

NATO military exercise

- Part of the Cold War (1947–1953)
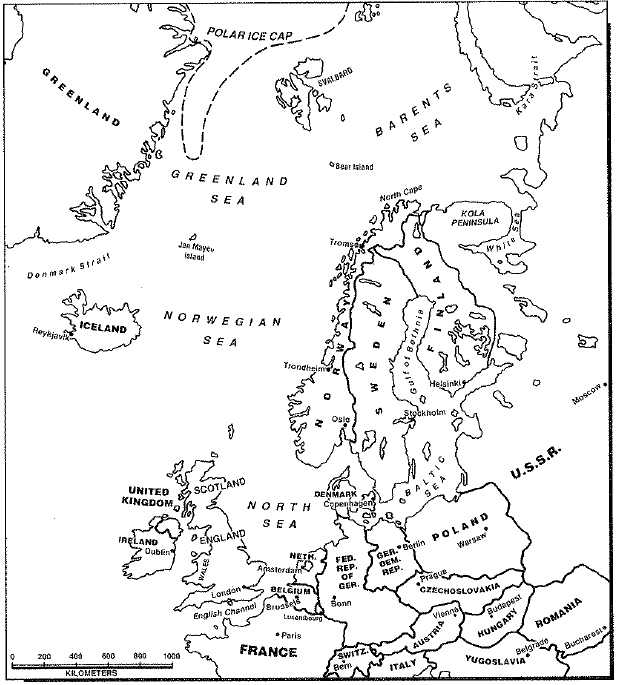
- NATO Northern Flank
- Type: NATO combined naval training exercises
- Location: North Atlantic Ocean, GIUK Gap, Norwegian Sea, Barents Sea, North Sea, Jutland Peninsula, and Baltic Sea
- Planned by: SACLANT & SACEUR
- Objective: Deployment of NATO anti-submarine warfare forces, aircraft carrier strike forces, and supply convoys
- Date: September 14–25, 1952
- Executed by: Admiral Sir Patrick Brind, RN (CINCNORTH)
- Outcome: Exercise successfully executed

Exercise Mainbrace was the first large-scale naval exercise undertaken by the newly established Allied Command Atlantic (ACLANT), one of the two principal military commands of the North Atlantic Treaty Organization (NATO). It was part of a series of NATO exercises jointly commanded by Supreme Allied Commander Atlantic Admiral Lynde D. McCormick, USN, and Supreme Allied Commander Europe General Matthew B. Ridgeway, U.S. Army, during the fall of 1952.

== Naval activities in the North Atlantic, 1946–1951 ==
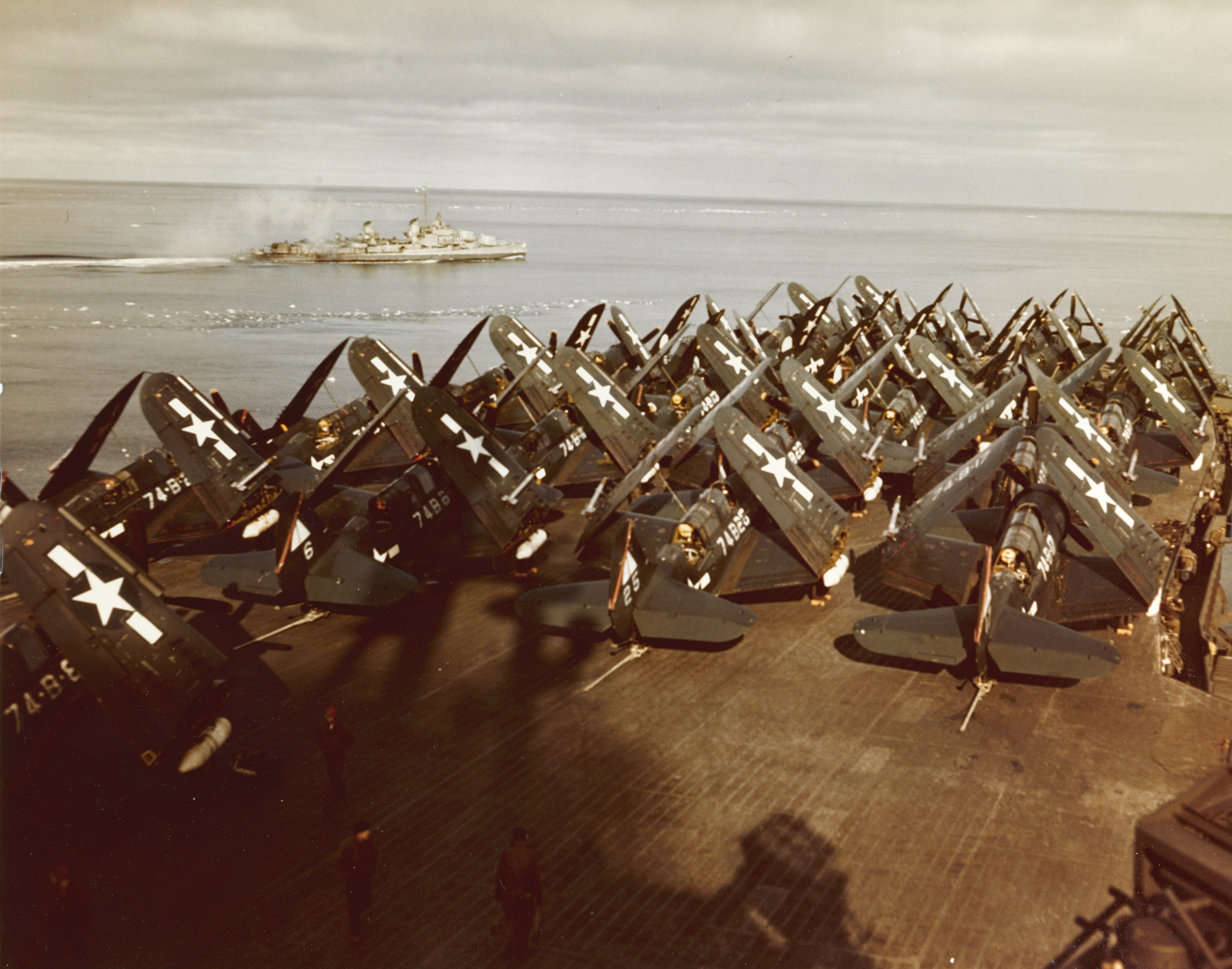
Operation Frostbite (1946)

The strategic importance of control of Norway and the adjacent Norwegian and Barents seas was recognized by Anglo-American naval planners as early as the First World War. The invasion and the occupation of Norway by Nazi Germany during World War II confirmed the importance of the region, as Germany established bases for submarine and air operations against Allied convoys bound for the Soviet seaport of Murmansk.

After the Second World War, several former allied navies executed a number of individual and multinational exercises, including:

- Operation Frostbite (pictured), a 1946 naval exercise involving U.S. Navy Task Group 21.11 led by the aircraft carrier USS Midway (CVB-41) that operated in the Davis Straits between Labrador and Greenland;
- Exercise Verity, a 1949 combined naval exercise involving the British, French, and Dutch navies which carried out naval bombardment, convoy escort, minesweeping, and Motor Torpedo Boat attack evolutions;
- Exercise Activity, a 1950 Dutch-led naval exercise to refine combined communications and tactical procedures; and
- Exercise Progress, a 1951 French-led combined naval operation with Belgian, French, Danish, Dutch, Norwegian, and British naval units that participating in antisubmarine warfare operations, air defense maneuvers, minesweeping operations, and convoy exercises.

== Operational history ==
Initial planning for Exercise Mainbrace was initiated by General Dwight D. Eisenhower prior to his resignation as NATO's Supreme Allied Commander Europe (SACEUR) to run for the President of the United States. The exercise itself was commanded jointly by SACLANT Admiral Lynde D. McCormick, USN, and SACEUR General Matthew B. Ridgeway, U.S. Army, with the immediate theater commander being Admiral Sir Patrick Brind, RN, who was in Commander-in-Chief Allied Forces Northern Europe.

Mainbrace was conducted over twelve days between September 14–25, 1952, and involved nine navies: United States Navy, the British Royal Navy, French Navy, Royal Canadian Navy, Royal Danish Navy, Royal Norwegian Navy, Portuguese Navy, Royal Netherlands Navy, and Belgian Naval Force operating in the Norwegian Sea, the Barents Sea, the North Sea near the Jutland Peninsula, and the Baltic Sea. Its objective was to convince Denmark and Norway that those nations could be defended against attack from the Soviet Union. The exercise featured simulated carrier air strikes against "enemy" formation attacking NATO's northern flank near Bodø, Norway, naval air attacks against aggressors near the Kiel Canal, anti-submarine and anti-ship operations, and U.S. marines landing in Denmark.

=== Force composition ===
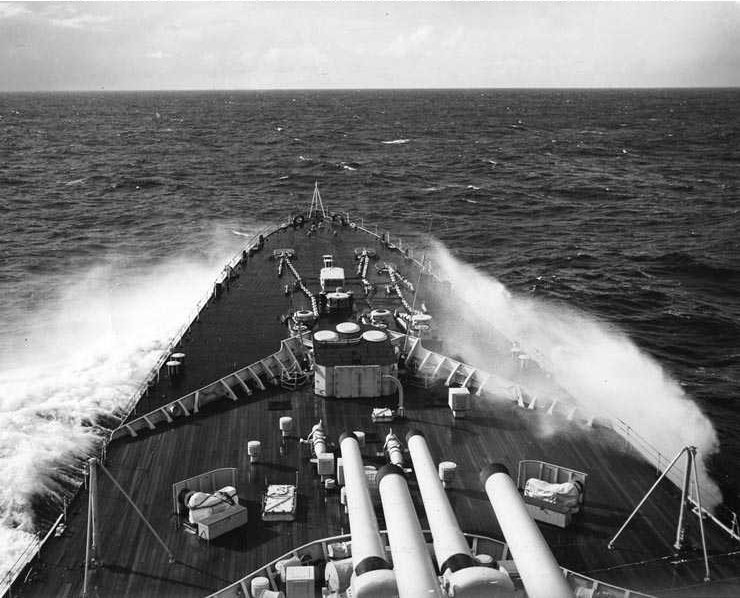
Seas break over the bow of HMS Vanguard making a high speed run

Eighty thousand men, over 200 ships, and 1,000 aircraft participated in Mainbrace. The New York Times' military reporter Hanson W. Baldwin described this NATO naval force as being the "largest and most powerful fleet that has cruised in the North Sea since World War I."

Naval Forces - Operation Mainbrace, 1952
NATO member	Aircraft carriers	Battleships	Cruisers	Escorts	MCM	Submarines	Torpedo boat squadrons	Motor ships/Naval trawlers	Total
United States	6	1	3	40	—	9	—	—	59
UK	3	1	2	31	—	17	4	8 + Trawlers	66
Canada	1	—	1	5	—	—	—	—	7
France	—	—	—	7	11	—	—	2	20
Denmark	—	—	—	3	2	2	—	—	7
Norway	—	—	—	2	16	2	3	3	26
Portugal	—	—	—	3	—	—	—	—	3
Netherlands	—	—	—	5	—	3	—	5	13
Belgium	—	—	—	—	2	—	—	—	2
TOTALS:	10	2	6	96	31	33	7	18	203

Blue Fleet Fast Carrier Task Force

USS Franklin D. Roosevelt with Carrier Air Group 17 (CVG-17):

- Fighter Squadron 171 (VF-171)
- Fighter Squadron 172 (VF-172)
- Fighter Squadron 174 (VF-174)
- Attack Squadron 175 (VA-175)
- Fleet Composite Squadron 12 (VC-12) Detachment 42
- Fleet Composite Squadron 33 (VC-33) Detachment 42
- Fleet Composite Squadron 62 (VC-62) Detachment 42
- Utility Helicopter Squadron 2 (HU-2) Detachment 41

USS Midway with Carrier Air Group 6 (CVG-6):

- Fighter Squadron 61 (VF-61)
- Fighter Squadron 42 (VF-42)
- Fighter Squadron 41 (VF-41)
- Fighter Squadron 21 (VF-21)
- Attack Squadron 25 (VA-25)
- Fleet Composite Squadron 8 (VC-8)
- Fleet Composite Squadron 12 (VC-12) Detachment 41
- Fleet Composite Squadron 33 (VC-33) Detachment 41
- Fleet Composite Squadron 62 (VC-62) Detachment 41
- Utility Helicopter Squadron 2 (HU-2) Detachment 41

USS Wasp and Carrier Air Group 1 (CVG-1):

- Fighter Squadron 14 (VF-14)
- Fighter Squadron 12 (VF-12)
- Attack Squadron 15 (VA-15)
- Fleet Composite Squadron 62 (VC-62) Detachment 18
- Fleet Composite Squadron 12 (VC-12) Detachment 18
- Utility Helicopter Squadron 2 (HU-2) Detachment 18

HMS Eagle:

- 800 Naval Air Squadron
- 803 Naval Air Squadron
- 809 Naval Air Squadron
- 812 Naval Air Squadron
- 814 Naval Air Squadron
- 827 Naval Air Squadron
- 849 Naval Air Squadron
- Ship Flight 1

HMS Illustrious:

- 4 Naval Air Squadron
- 824 Naval Air Squadron
- 860 Naval Air Squadron - Royal Netherlands Navy

Light aircraft carriers

- USS Wright
- HMS Theseus
- HMCS Magnificent

Escort aircraft carriers

- USS Mindoro
- USS Salerno Bay

Battleships

- USS Wisconsin
- HMS Vanguard

Cruisers

- USS Quincy
- USS Columbus
- USS Des Moines
- HMS Swiftsure
- HMCS Quebec

Amphibious force flagship

- USS Mount Olympus
- USS Tidewater

=== Gallery ===
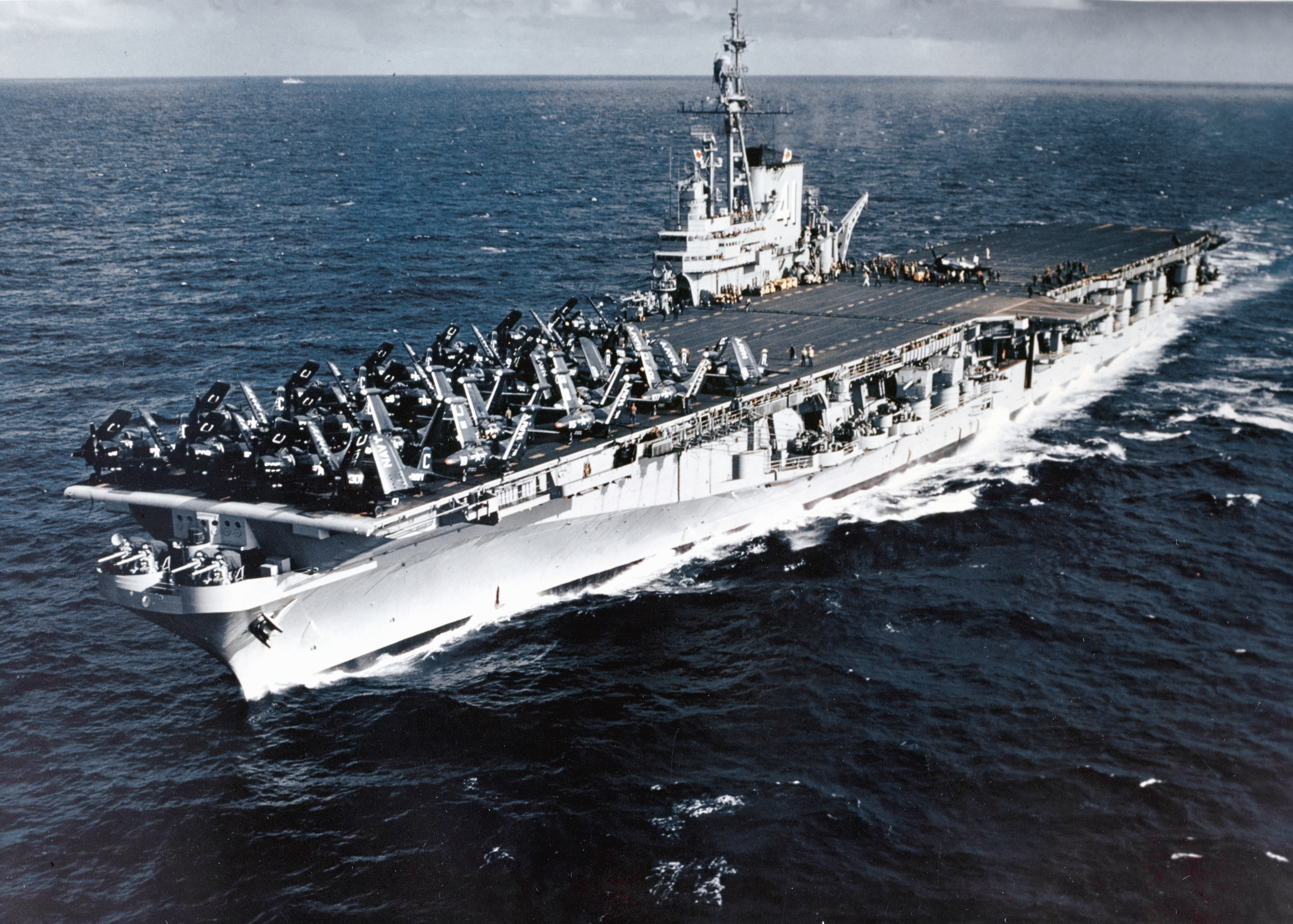
USS Midway

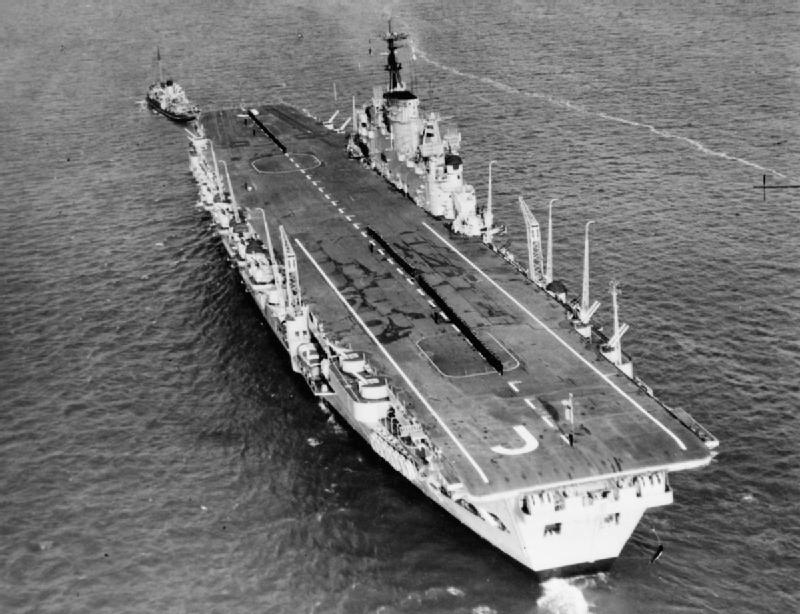
HMS Eagle

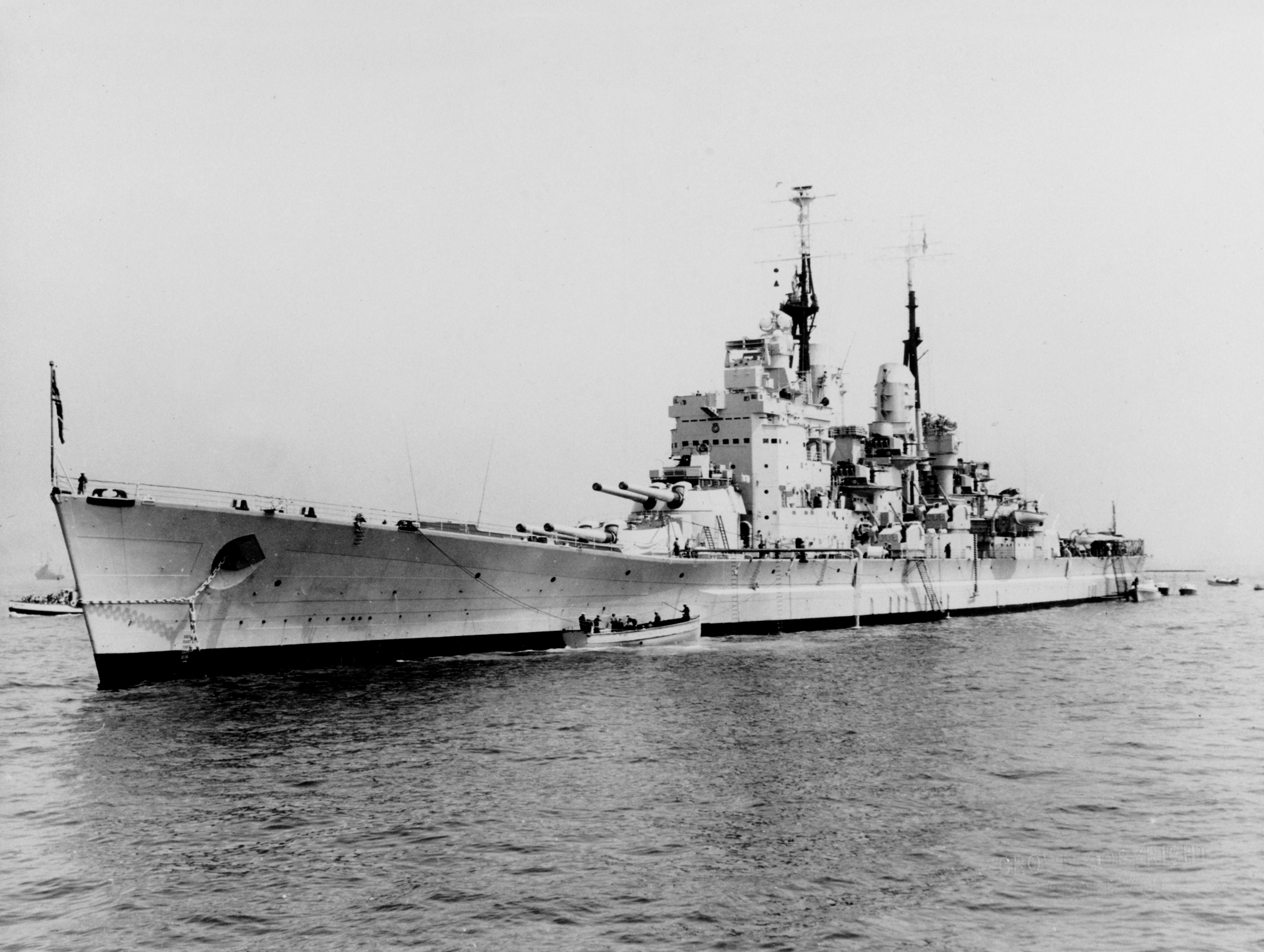
HMS Vanguard

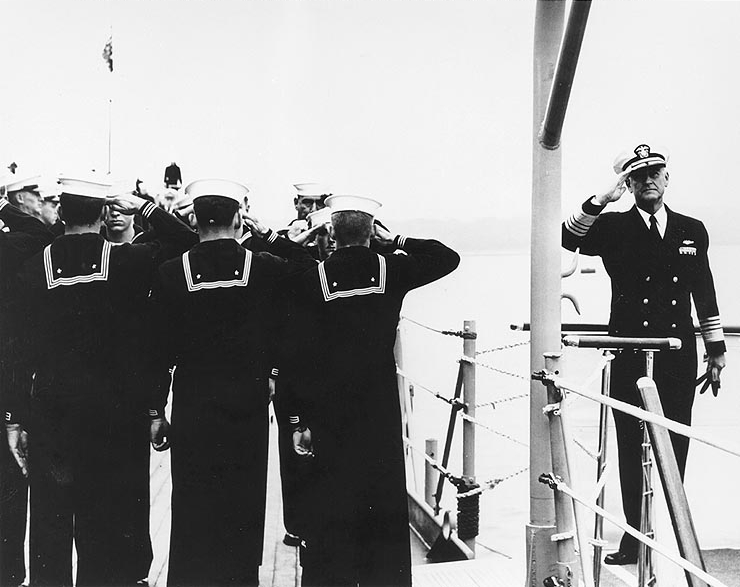
Admiral McCormick

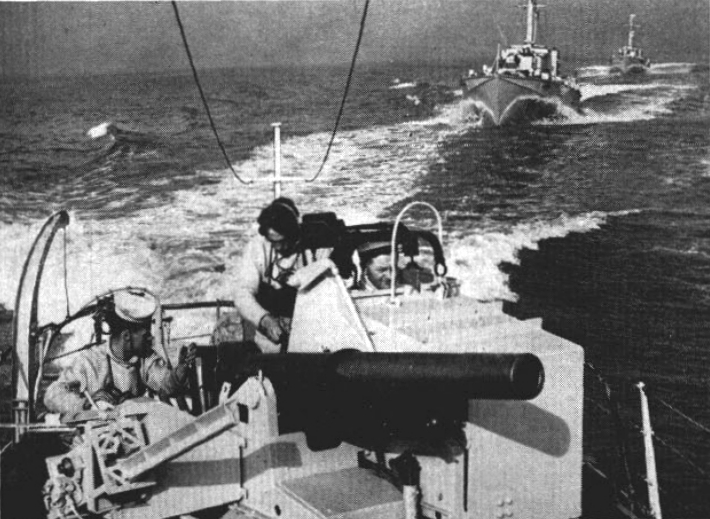
British MTBs underway

== Other NATO military exercises - fall 1952 ==
Exercise Mainbrace was part of a series of NATO exercise jointly commanded by Admiral McCormick and General Ridgeway during the Fall of 1952 involving 300,000 military personnel engaged in maneuvers from the Arctic Circle to the Mediterranean Sea.

Two exercises were conducted by NATO's Allied Forces Southern Europe during the Fall of 1952. Ancient Wall was a series of military maneuvers involving ground small unit tactical training, land-based tactical air support, and carrier-based air support. Longstep was a ten-day naval exercise held in the Mediterranean Sea during November 1952 involving over 170 warships and 700 aircraft under the overall command of Admiral Carney. The objective of the Allied ("Blue") forces was to dislodge enemy ("Green") invasion forces from their occupying positions in the Eastern Mediterranean. Blue naval forces were centered around the U.S. Sixth Fleet, under the command of Vice Admiral John H. Cassady, USN, and its two aircraft carriers, the Franklin D. Roosevelt and Wasp. Green forces included submarines and land-based aircraft. The exercise concluded with an amphibious landing at Lebidos Bay south of İzmir, involving 3000 French, Italian, and Greek troops, including the Battalion Landing Team 3/2, under the overall command of General Robert E. Hogaboom, USMC.

== Aftermath ==
The Soviet Union characterized Mainbrace, Holdfast, and other NATO military exercises as "war-like acts" by NATO, with particular reference to the participation of Norway and Denmark, while the USSR was preparing for its own military maneuvers in the Soviet Zone.

The exercise would also be referenced in Project Blue Book after two RAF Shackleton crews flying out of RAF Topcliffe (UK) saw a fast-moving silver disc near the air base, travelling at 15,000-feet, with ground personnel at nearby RAF Dishforth also spotting a similarly-described disc seemingly following an RAF Meteor jet fighter, as it maneuvered during aerobatics, on September 19th. The sightings were reported at the time in many UK newspapers, often as front-page lead articles. A fortnight later NATO stated Danish aircrew had seen a silver disc over the North Sea on the same day as the RAF encounters.

== See also ==
- Cold War (1953–1962)
- Northern Wedding
- Operation Grand Slam (NATO)
- Operation Strikeback

== Sources and references ==
- Allard, Dean C. (January 2001). "Strategic Views of the US Navy and NATO on the Northern Flank, 1917-1991" (PDF). The Northern Mariner. XI (1): 11–24.
- Fry, Roger (October 2007). "HMS Vanguard: A short history of Britain's last battleship" (PDF). Vanguard (10): 33. Archived from the original (PDF) on 2011-07-24.
- Gary, USN (Ret.), GMC Richard M. (Summer 2009). "USS QUINCY CA-71". U.S. Navy Cruiser Sailors Association: 34.
- L'Heureux CD, RCN (Ret'd), Commander E.J. "Aircraft Carriers Royal Canadian Navy (RCN)" (PDF). Canada Aviation Museum. Archived from the original (PDF) on 2011-01-10.
- Till, Geoffrey (April 2005). "Holding the Bridge in Troubled Times: The Cold War and the Navies of Europe" (PDF). The Journal of Strategic Studies. 28 (2). Taylor & Francis Group Ltd: 309–337. doi:10.1080/01402390500088379. ISSN 0140-2390. Archived from the original (PDF) on 2009-11-04.
- Sydney Morning Herald - "NATO Ships Enter Baltic Sea" - September 16, 1952
- Time, "Operation Mainbrace", September 22, 1952
- Time, "NATO: Hedgehogs", September 29, 1952
- Thompson, Roger (2007). Lessons Not Learned: The U.S. Navy's Status Quo Culture. Naval Institute Press. ISBN 1-59114-865-0.
