= Exercise Longstep =

1952 NATO naval exercise in eastern Mediterranean Sea

Longstep
- Part of the Cold War (1947–1953)
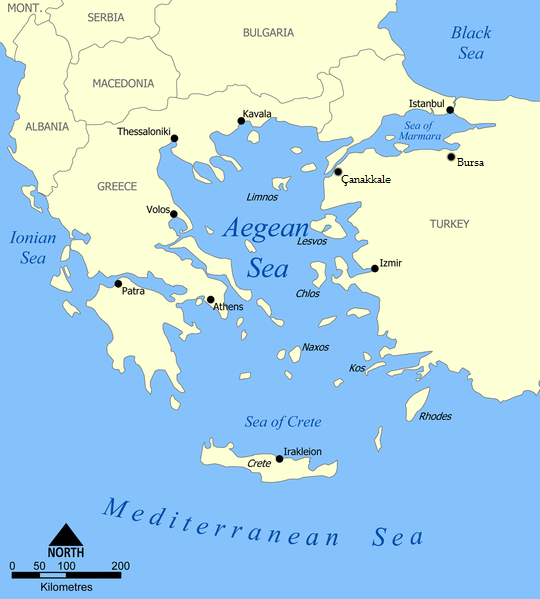
- Aegean Sea
- Type: NATO multi-lateral naval exercises
- Location: NATO Southern Region: Northern Italy, Mediterranean Sea, Aegean Sea, Turkey
- Planned by: Allied Forces Southern Europe (AFSOUTH)
- Objective: Deployment of NATO naval and amphibious forces
- Date: November 1952
- Executed by: Admiral Robert B. Carney, USN, Commander-in-Chief Allied Forces Southern Europe (CINCAFSOUTH)

Exercise Longstep was a ten-day NATO naval exercise held in the Mediterranean Sea during November 1952 under the overall command of Admiral Robert B. Carney, USN, the Commander-in-Chief Allied Forces Southern Europe (CINCAFSOUTH). This exercise involved over 170 warships and 700 aircraft, and it featured a large-scale amphibious assault along the western coast of Turkey. With Exercise Grand Slam, this exercise served as the prototype for future NATO maritime exercises in the Mediterranean Sea during the Cold War.

== Background ==
In January 1950, the North Atlantic Council approved NATO's military strategic concept of deterring Soviet aggression. NATO military planning took on a renewed urgency following the outbreak of the Korean War, prompting NATO to establish Supreme Headquarters Allied Powers Europe (SHAPE) under the command of General of the Army Dwight D. Eisenhower, U.S. Army, on 2 April 1951. Exercise Longstep was an early naval exercise for SHAPE's southern regional command, Allied Forces Southern Europe (AFSOUTH).

== Command structure ==
The overall exercise commander for Grand Slam was Admiral Robert B. Carney USN, NATO's Commander-in-Chief Allied Forces Southern Europe (CINCSOUTH). AFSOUTH component commanders during Longstep were:

- Allied Air Force South (AIRSOUTH) - Major General David M. Schlatter, USAF
- Allied Land Forces Southern Europe (LANDSOUTH) - Lieutenant General Maurizio Lazzaro De Castiglioni, Italian Army
- Allied Naval Forces South (NAVSOUTH) - Vice Admiral John H. Cassady, USN

== Operation history ==
The objective of the Allied ("Blue") forces was to dislodge enemy ("Green") invasion forces from their occupying positions in the Eastern Mediterranean. Green forces consisted of the Italian 56th Tactical Air Force and submarines of the United States, Great Britain, France, Greece, and Turkey lying in wait to ambush the Blue amphibious convoy departing from Italian embarkation ports. Over 170 warships and 700 aircraft were involved in Operation Longstep.

Blue naval forces were centered around the U.S. Sixth Fleet, under the command of Vice Admiral John H. Cassady, USN, and its two aircraft carriers, the Franklin D. Roosevelt and Wasp. Air sorties were flown by American and Italian aircraft attacking Blue naval forces, and Blue carrier-based aircraft counter-attacking Green military targets in northern Italy. Operation Longstep concluded with an amphibious landing at Lebidos Bay south of İzmir, Turkey, involving 3000 French, Italian, and Greek troops, including the Third Battalion, Second Marines, under the overall command of General Robert E. Hogaboom, USMC.

In the actual landing at Lebidos Bay, the Italians went ashore at H-Hour minus six in a diversionary attack on nearby Doganbey Island. This was followed by the main landing force led U.S. Marines along with the French and Greek troops. After securing the beach-head and setting up a defensive perimeter, the landing force was re-embarked onto the amphibious shipping off-shore, concluding Exercise Longstep.

=== Carrier aviation units ===
Carrier Air Group Seventeen (CVG-17) embarked on USS Franklin D. Roosevelt (CVB-42):

- Fighter Squadron 174 (VF-174): Vought F4U-4 Corsair
- Fighter Squadron 172 (VF-172): McDonnell F2H-2 Banshee
- Attack Squadron 175 (VA-175): Douglas AD-4/4L Skyraider
- Heavy Attack Squadron 3 (VAH-3): Douglas A3D-1 Skywarrior
- Fleet Composite Squadron 62 (VC-62) Detachment: McDonnell F2H-2P Banshee
- Fleet Composite Squadron 33 (VC-33) Detachment: Douglas AD-4N Skyraider
- Fleet Composite Squadron 12 (VC-12) Detachment: Douglas AD-4W Skyraider
- Utility Helicopter Squadron 2 (HU-2) Detachment: Piasecki HUP-1

Carrier Air Group Eighteen (CVG-18) embarked on USS Wasp (CV-18):

- Fighter Squadron 14 (VF-12): Vought F4U-4 Corsair
- Fighter Squadron 12 (VF-12): McDonnell F2H-2 Banshee
- Attack Squadron 15 (VA-15): Douglas AD-4 Skyraider
- Fleet Composite Squadron 62 (VC-62) Detachment 38: McDonnell F2H-2P Banshee
- Fleet Composite Squadron 12 (VC-12) Detachment 38: Douglas AD-4W Skyraider
- Utility Helicopter Squadron 2 (HU-2) Detachment: Piasecki HUP-1

== Legacy ==
Longstep was an early attempt to integrate the various naval forces into a more combined force under NATO command. Another important aspect of Longstep was combined training in the coordination of radio and wire communications between ships, aircraft, and ground forces of the six-nation, five-language combined force.

== See also ==
- Cold War (1947–1953)
- Exercise Grand Slam
