= AFSOUTH =

AFSOUTH may refer to:

- Air Forces Southern, or Twelfth Air Force, the air force component of US Southern Command
- Allied Joint Force Command Naples, previously Allied Forces Southern Europe, where southern European NATO operations are directed from
