= Exercise Grand Slam =

- Part of the Cold War (1947–1953)
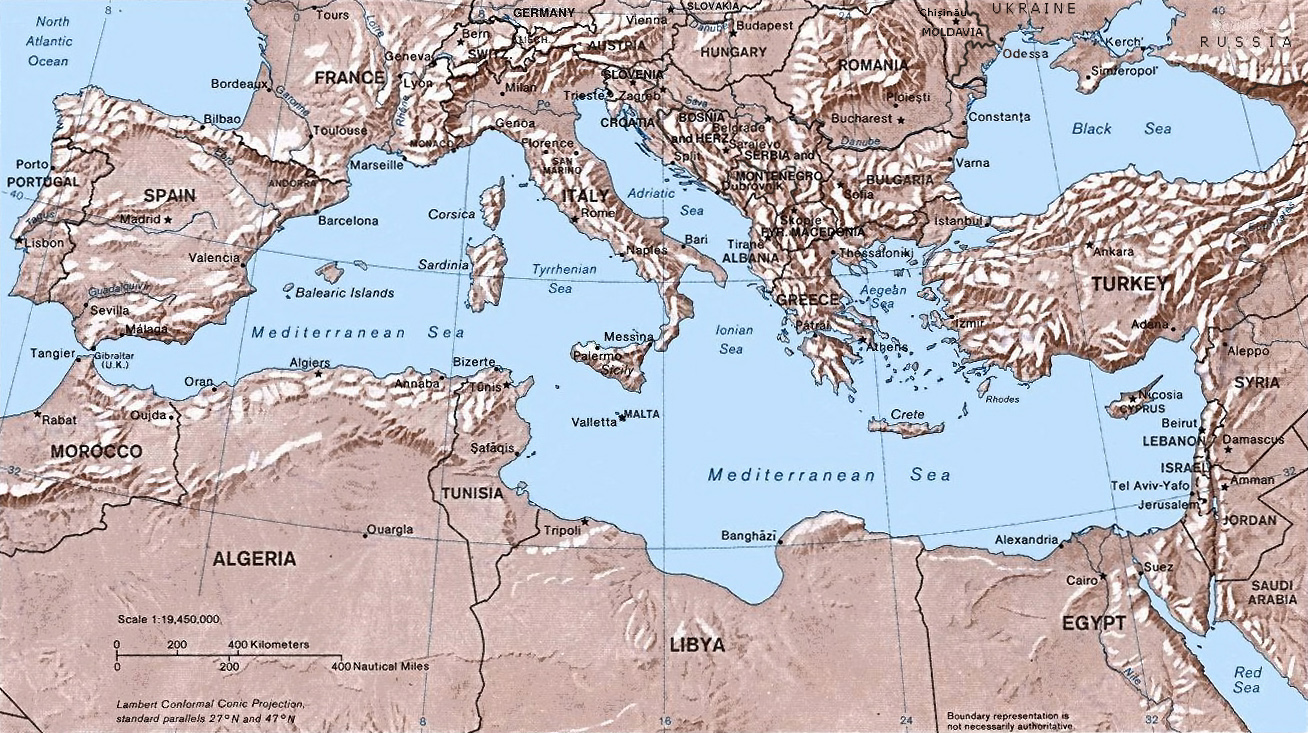
- Mediterranean Sea
- Type: NATO combined naval training exercises
- Location: Mediterranean Sea
- Planned by: Allied Forces Southern Europe (CINCSOUTH)
- Objective: Deployment of NATO anti-submarine warfare, aircraft carrier strike forces, and supply convoys
- Date: 25 February to 16 March 1952
- Executed by: Admiral Robert B. Carney, USN, Commander-in-Chief Allied Forces Southern Europe (CINCSOUTH)
- Outcome: Exercise successfully executed.

Exercise Grand Slam was an early major naval exercise of the newly formed North Atlantic Treaty Organization (NATO). This 1952 combined naval exercise took place in the Mediterranean Sea, and it included a naval force that was described as being "the largest armada to be assembled in that area since the end of World War II." Exercise Grand Slam was an early test for NATO's Allied Forces Southern Europe. With Exercise Longstep, this exercise served as the prototype for future NATO maritime exercises in the Mediterranean Sea during the Cold War.

== Background ==
In January 1950, the North Atlantic Council approved NATO's military strategy of deterring Soviet aggression. NATO military planning took on a renewed urgency following the outbreak of the Korean War in mid-1950, prompting NATO to establish a "force under a centralised command, adequate to deter aggression and to ensure the defence of Western Europe". Allied Command Europe was established under General of the Army Dwight D. Eisenhower, U.S. Army, on 2 April 1951. The Western Union Defence Organization had previously carried out Exercise Verity, a 1949 multilateral exercise involving naval air strikes and submarine attacks.

== Command structure ==
The overall exercise commander for Grand Slam was Admiral Robert B. Carney USN, NATO's Commander-in-Chief Allied Forces Southern Europe (CINCSOUTH). AFSOUTH component commanders during Grand Slam were:

- Allied Air Force South (AIRSOUTH) - Major General David M. Schlatter, USAF
- Allied Land Forces Southern Europe (LANDSOUTH) - Lieutenant General Maurizio Lazzaro De Castiglioni, Italian Army
- Allied Naval Forces South (NAVSOUTH) - Vice Admiral John H. Cassady, USN

== Operational history ==
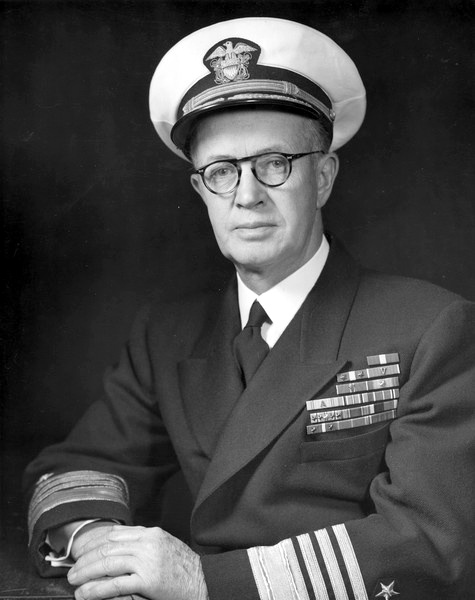
Admiral Robert B. Carney, USN - NATO CINCSOUTH (1951–1953)

The exercise took place in the Mediterranean Sea between 25 February and 16 March 1952. Over 200 warships from the U.S. Sixth Fleet, British Mediterranean Fleet, French Mediterranean forces, and the Italian Navy deployed from bases in the British Isles, Southern France, Italy, Gibraltar, Malta, and North Africa for Exercise Grand Slam.

The main force was centered around the aircraft carriers USS Midway, USS Tarawa, HMS Theseus, and La Fayette. Also, the U.S. Marine Corps Battalion Landing Team 3/8 (Reinforced) was the Landing Force (Task Force 62) for the U.S. Sixth Fleet following its deployment from Morehead City, North Carolina, on 8 January 1952, returning to Camp Lejeune on 20 May. Marine Detachment, Headquarters Support Activities of CINCSOUTH was activated at Naples, Italy, on 8 March 1952 under the command of Captain Raymond B. Spicer, USMC. Land-based aircraft from all four nations, as well as American, British, and French submarines, rounded out the allied forces involved in this exercise.

Allied warships escorted three convoys of supply ships which were subjected to repeated simulated air and submarine attacks. One convoy that departed Malta experienced air attacks every four hours and submarine attacks every five hours during its entire six days at sea. Opposition forces against this particular convoy included the French naval task force, land-based strike aircraft, and carrier-based aircraft from the Midway. All three convoys arrived at their respective destinations although with numerous ships declared damaged or sunk by the simulated enemy attacks.

Anti-submarine warfare (ASW) operations were also executed by the allied navies during Operation Grand Slam. However, a French submarine successfully penetrated the destroyer screen protecting the American-French carrier task force and successfully sank a target within that formation. That French submarine was subsequently declared to be heavily crippled by ASW forces. Finally, a surface force consisting of eight cruisers and ten destroyers carried out a shore bombardment off the Sardinian coast.

=== Carrier aviation units ===
Carrier Air Group Six embarked on USS Midway (CVB-41):

- Fighter Squadron 61 (VF-61): Grumman F9F-2 Panther
- Fighter Squadron 41 (VF-41): Vought F4U-4 Corsair
- Fighter Squadron 21 (VF-21): Grumman F9F-2 Panther
- Attack Squadron 25 (VA-25): Douglas AD-1 Skyraider
- Marine Fighter Squadron 225 (VMF-225): Vought F4U-4 Corsair
- Fleet Composite Squadron 62 (VC-62) Detachment 41: Douglas AD-1 Skyraider
- Fleet Composite Squadron 33 (VC-33) Detachment 41: Douglas AD-4N Skyraider
- Fleet Composite Squadron 12 (VC-12) Detachment 41: Douglas AD-4W Skyraider
- Utility Helicopter Squadron 2 (HU-2) Detachment 41: Piasecki HUP-1 & Sikorsky HO3S-1

Carrier Air Group Eight embarked on USS Tarawa (CV-40):

- Fighter Squadron 921 (VF-921): Vought F4U-4 Corsair
- Fighter Squadron 916 (VF-916): Vought F4U-4 Corsair
- Fighter Squadron 742 (VF-742): Vought F4U-4 Corsair
- Fighter Squadron 671 (VF-671): Vought F4U-4 Corsair
- Attack Squadron 859 (VA-859): Douglas AD-1 Skyraider
- Fleet Composite Squadron 62 (VC-62) Detachment 40: McDonnell F2H-2P Banshee
- Fleet Composite Squadron 33 (VC-33) Detachment 40: Douglas AD-4N Skyraider
- Fleet Composite Squadron 12 (VC-12) Detachment 40: Douglas AD-4N Skyraider
- Utility Helicopter Squadron 2 (HU-2) Detachment 40: Piasecki HUP-1 & Sikorsky HO3S-1

14th Carrier Air Group embarked on HMS Theseus (R64):

- 810 Naval Air Squadron: Fairey Firefly
- 807 Naval Air Squadron: Hawker Sea Fury

== Conclusion ==
The overall exercise commander, Admiral Carney summarized the accomplishments of Exercise Grand Slam by stating: "We have demonstrated that the senior commanders of all four powers can successfully take charge of a mixed task force and handle it effectively as a working unit." Exercise Grand Slam did receive comparatively little contemporary media coverage. The U.S. Navy's All Hands magazine noted that Grand Slam was "an exercise which will probably prove typical of future NATO naval exercises."

== See also ==
- Exercise Longstep
