= Allied Air Command İzmir =

Former subordinate command of NATO's Allied Joint Force Command Naples

- Coat of arms
- Active: 2004–2013
- Allegiance: (NATO) North Atlantic Treaty Organization
- Part of: Allied Command Operations, Casteau, Belgium
- HQ: General Vecihi Akin Garrison, İzmir, Turkey

Allied Air Command İzmir was a military aviation component command of the NATO Military Command Structure from 2004 to 2013.

== History ==
Previously designated Allied Air Forces Southern Europe (AIRSOUTH) and located in Italy, the Headquarters of the Allied Air Component Command for Southern Europe was established in İzmir, Turkey, on 11 August 2004. The command, which was renamed the Allied Air Command İzmir in 2010, reported to the Allied Joint Force Command Naples based in Naples, Italy. The last commander of the NATO Allied Air Component Command İzmir was Lieutenant General Ralph Jodice. It was deactivated on 1 June 2013 when Allied Air Command at Ramstein became the sole allied air component command.
