= Exercise Verity =

Military exercises by powers in Western Europe

- Part of the Cold War (1947–1953)
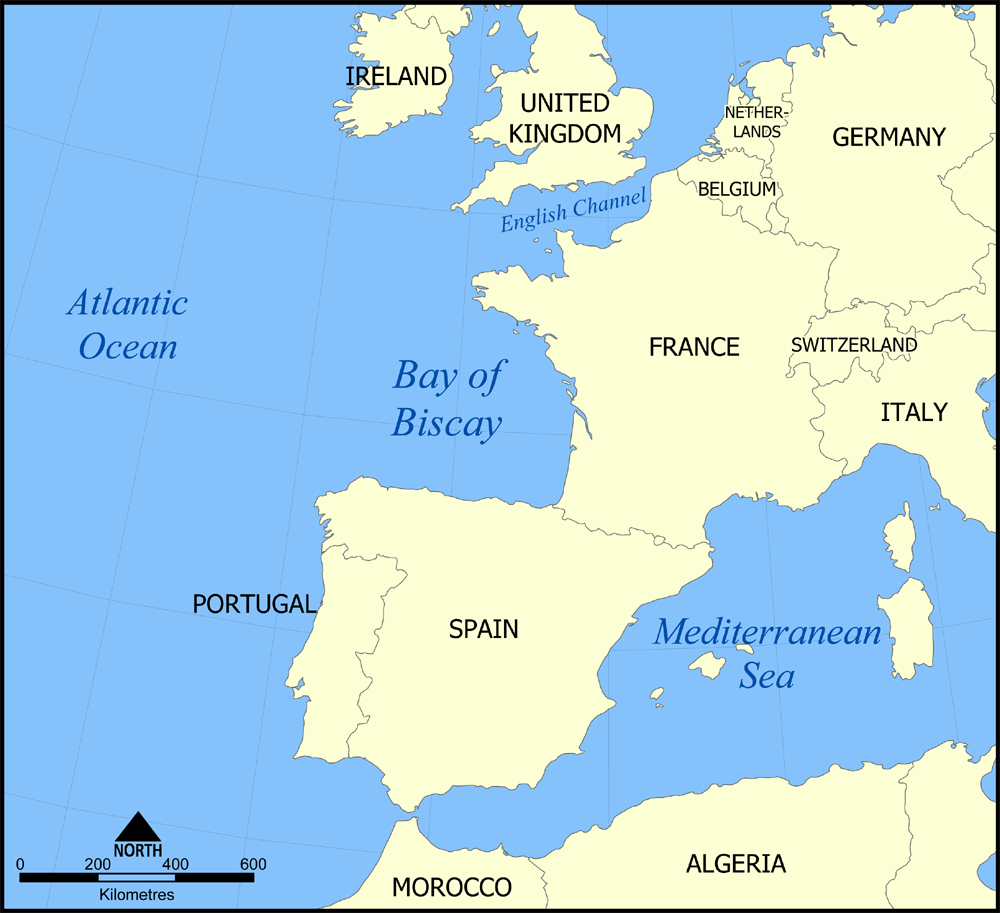
- Bay of Biscay
- Type: Multi-lateral naval training exercises
- Location: Bay of Biscay
- Planned by: Western Union
- Objective: Deployment of anti-submarine, aircraft carrier, naval bombardment, convoy escort, minesweeping, and motor torpedo boat attack forces
- Date: July 1949
- Executed by: Admiral of the Fleet Sir Rhoderick Robert McGrigor GCB, RN
- Outcome: Exercise successfully executed

Exercise Verity was the only major training exercise of the Western Union (WU). Undertaken in July 1949, it involved 60 warships from the British, French, Belgian and Dutch navies. A contemporary newsreel described this exercise as involving "the greatest assembly of warships since the Battle of Jutland."

== Command structure ==
The command authority for Exercise Verity was the Western Union. Field Marshal the Viscount Montgomery of Alamein was WUDO's senior officer as Chairman of the Commanders-in-Chief Committee.

Admiral of the Fleet Sir Rhoderick McGrigor, RN, was in overall command of Exercise Verity. At the time of the exercise, Admiral McGrigor was serving as Commander-in-Chief of the British Royal Navy's Home Fleet.

== Operation ==
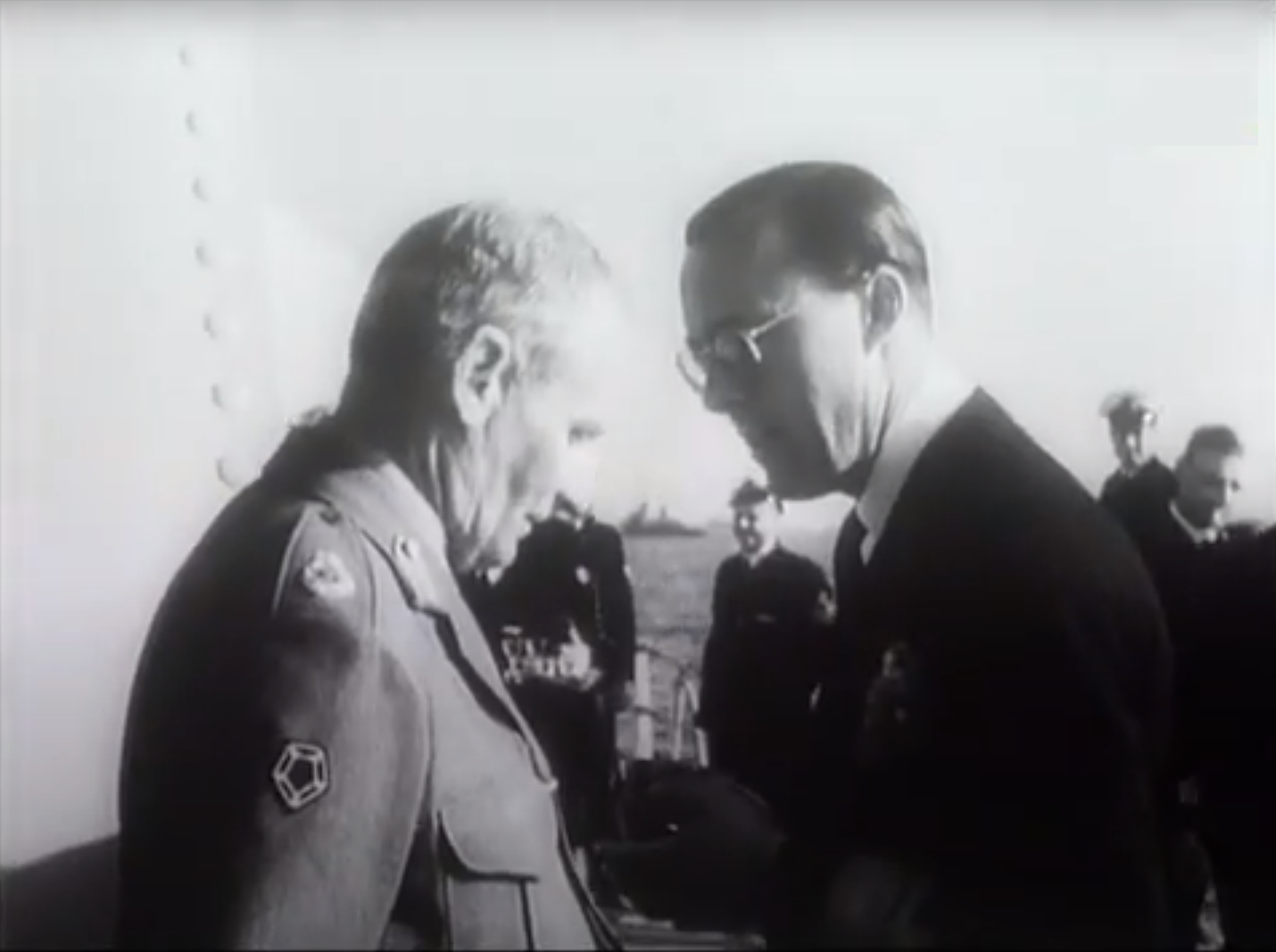
Chairman Bernard Montgomery of the C-in-C Committee wearing the WU shoulder badge when meeting Dutch Prince Bernhard aboard HNLMS Tromp in July 1949 during Exercise Verity.

The 60-ship fleet gathered in Mount's Bay, near Penzance, prior to setting sail for the Bay of Biscay for the week-long exercise. Field Marshal Montgomery held a reception on board the flagship, the aircraft carrier HMS Implacable. Prince Bernhard of the Netherlands sponsored a cocktail party aboard the cruiser HNLMS Tromp. Field Marshal Montgomery stayed on board the Implacable as an observer during the exercise.

Submarines, including the highly advanced French boat Roland Morillot, made simulated attacks against convoys and naval formations using dummy torpedoes. The exercise included bombers flying from land-based airfields. French and British carriers also launched air strikes, with Implacable successfully carrying out strike operations against the enemy ("White") aircraft carrier force led by the light aircraft carriers HMS Theseus and the French Arromanches. (Note: Actually sister ships, Arromanches formerly being HMS Colossus) Naval bombardment and convoy escort operations were also carried out. Finally, motor torpedo craft of the Belgian Navy joined other Western Union warships to execute mine-sweeping operations in Weymouth Bay.

On 4 July the White force aircraft (RAF Lancasters and Dutch fighters) operated searches against the Blue force (escorted by French aircraft and British flying boats) as it approached the Bay of Biscay.

Later both naval surface forces combined in a simulated convoy - the aircraft carriers standing in for troopships - with Lancasters, Mitchells and Meteors as air cover. Land based fighters and naval strike aircraft practiced attacks with cannon and rockets against the smaller ships and then against the main force of four carriers, the battleship Anson and supporting destroyers. The same was practiced the morning of the following day.

One unusual example of allied cooperation involved the replacement of the outer wing of a Netherlands Sea Fury fighter aircraft that had been damaged by a bird strike. Since the Royal Netherlands Navy did not provide such elaborate spare parts when the aircraft's group deployed to RNAS Culdrose, the damaged Sea Fury received a replacement wing with British markings.

Admiral McGrigor summarized the accomplishments of Exercise Verity by noting: "The object of these manoeuvres is to show that we are willing and able to work together in case of aggression ... I can say straight away that it's been a very great success".

== Force composition ==
Major naval units included the British battleship Anson; the British carriers Implacable, Victorious and Theseus; the French carrier Arromanches; three British and five French cruisers; and 21 "destroyers and destroyer escorts".

Aviation units included Royal Netherlands Air Force with Mitchell medium bombers and Meteor fighters, Royal Netherlands Navy Fireflies and Sea Furies Royal Netherlands Navy at French Maritime Air Force Dornier and Sunderland flying boats and Wellington bombers, operating from Brest and Lorient. Belgium contributed fighter aircraft in "a preliminary stage". The RAF forces included Avro Lancaster and Avro Lincoln heavy bombers, Sunderland flying boats and Meteor fighters. Overall control was RAF Coastal Command.

Implacable carried de Havilland Sea Hornet fighters and Blackburn Firebrand strike aircraft. The British 15th Carrier Air Group operated Fairey Fireflys and Hawker Sea Furies from land bases.

== See also ==
- Operation Grand Slam (NATO)
