= VF-82 =

Fighter Squadron 82
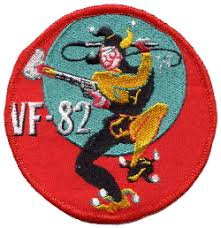
- Active: 1945-1946; 2 February 1951 – 15 April 1959
- Country: United States
- Branch: United States Navy
- Role: Fighter aircraft
- Part of: Inactive
- Nickname(s): Iron Men

Aircraft flown
- Fighter: F4U-4 Corsair; F9F-5 Panther; F2H-4 Banshee; F3H-2N Demon

Fighter Squadron 82 or VF-82 was an aviation unit of the United States Navy. Originally established as Reserve Squadron VF-742 it was called to active duty during World War II and later recalled on 2 February 1951, redesignated VF-82 on 4 February 1953, it was disestablished on 15 April 1959. It was the third US Navy squadron to be designated VF-82.

== Operational history ==
VF-742 was assigned to Carrier Air Group 8 (CVG-8) an all-reserve carrier wing. From 28 November 1951 to 11 June 1952 CVG-8 was embarked on USS Tarawa for a Mediterranean deployment, while on this deployment CVG-8 participated in Exercise Grand Slam.

From 12 March to 5 September 1956 CVG-8 was embarked on USS Intrepid for a Mediterranean deployment.

== Home port assignments ==
- NAS Jacksonville
- NAS Oceana

== Aircraft assignment ==
- F4U-4 Corsair
- F9F-5 Panther
- F2H-4 Banshee
- F3H-2N Demon

== See also ==
- History of the United States Navy
- List of inactive United States Navy aircraft squadrons
- List of United States Navy aircraft squadrons
