= Allied Air Forces Southern Europe =

- Active: 1951–2004
- Allegiance: (NATO) North Atlantic Treaty Organization
- Part of: Allied Forces Southern Europe, Naples, Italy
- HQ: Bagnoli, Naples, Italy

Allied Air Forces Southern Europe (AIRSOUTH) was a military aviation component command of the NATO Military Command Structure from 1951 to 2004.

== History ==
Allied Air Forces Southern Europe (AIRSOUTH) was established in temporary facilities in Florence, Italy on 5 August 1951. Its first commander was Lieutenant General David M. Schlatter. AIRSOUTH moved, along with its superior organisation, Allied Forces Southern Europe (AFSOUTH), to permanent facilities in the Bagnoli district of Naples in April 1954 and Lieutenant General Laurence Carbee Craigie took command of AIRSOUTH at that time. AIRSOUTH was in turn given command of the 6th Allied Tactical Air Force which was based in İzmir in Turkey.

From December 1992, Lieutenant General Joseph W. Ashy and then, from September 1994, Lieutenant General Michael E. Ryan, in their successive roles as commander of AIRSOUTH, directed the NATO air combat operations in Bosnia and Herzegovina, including the bombing missions of Operation Deliberate Force in summer 1995, which created the context for the U.S. Government to broker the Dayton Agreement between the waring parties in November 1995.

Lieutenant General Michael C. Short, as commander of AIRSOUTH, directed the NATO air combat operations in Kosovo, including the NATO bombing of Yugoslavia in spring 1999, during the Kosovo War, which led to the formation of the United Nations Interim Administration Mission in Kosovo in June 1999.

AIRSOUTH deactivated and some of its staff moved to İzmir in Turkey to form Allied Air Command İzmir in 2004. This move was strongly opposed at the time by the Greek Government who argued that it could give the Turkish Government influence over Greek airspace.
