= Ralph Jodice =

United States Air Force general

Ralph J. Jodice II
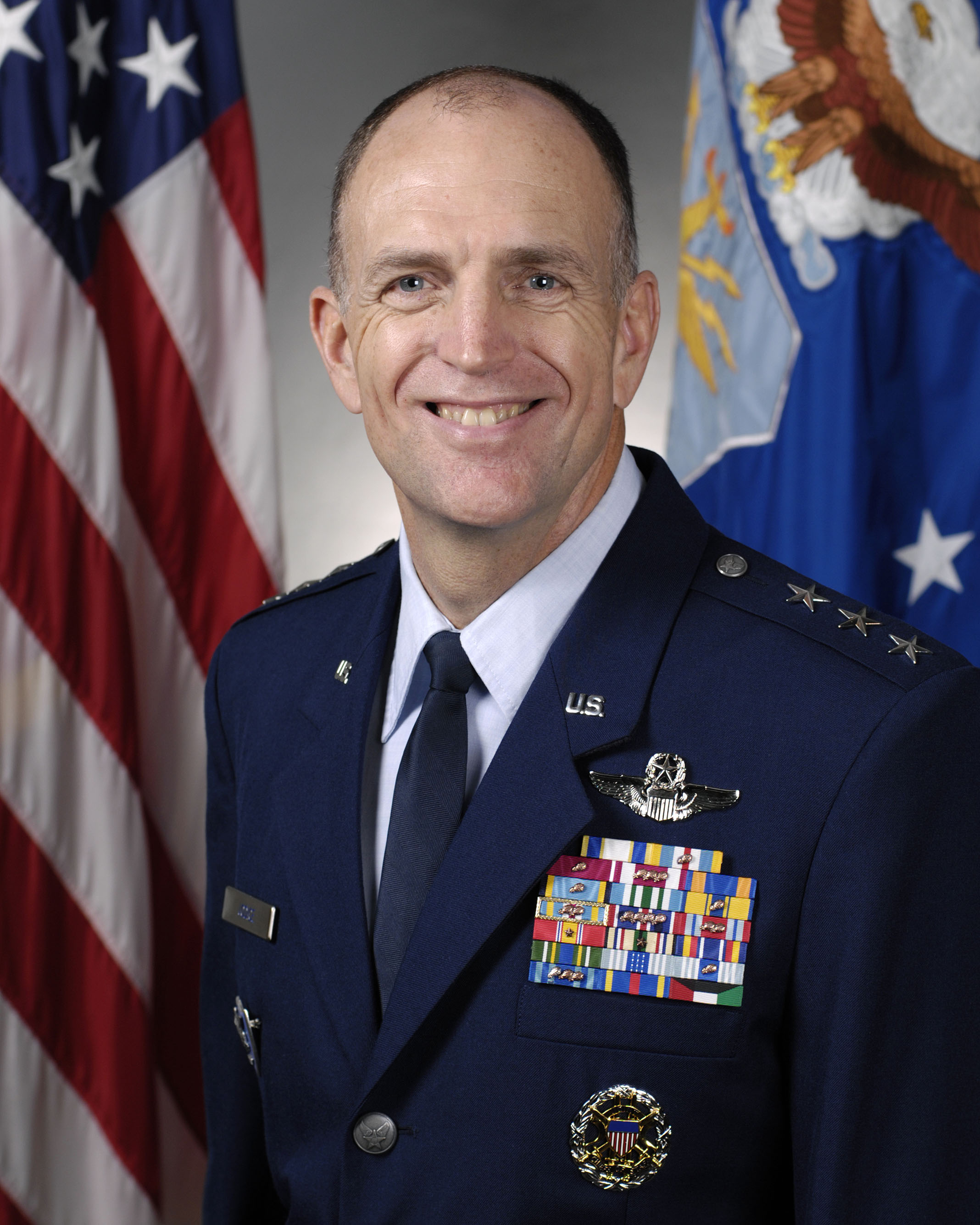
- Born: 1955 (age 70–71)
- Military career
- Allegiance: United States of America
- Branch: United States Air Force
- Service years: 1976–2013
- Rank: Lieutenant general
- Commands: NATO Allied Air Command İzmir; 16th Air Expeditionary Task Force; Air Force District of Washington; 80th Flying Training Wing; 4th Operations Group; 335th Fighter Squadron
- Conflicts: Gulf War; Operation Unified Protector
- Other work: Assistant Deputy Under Secretary of the Air Force (International Affairs); Defense Attaché, U.S. Embassy, Beijing

Lieutenant-General Ralph J. Jodice II (born 1955) is a retired United States Air Force general and a former Commander of NATO's Allied Air Command at İzmir, Turkey. He was also the Air Component Commander for Operation Unified Protector, NATO's operation to enforce United Nations Security Council resolutions 1970 and 1973 during the 2011 Libyan civil war.

== Awards ==
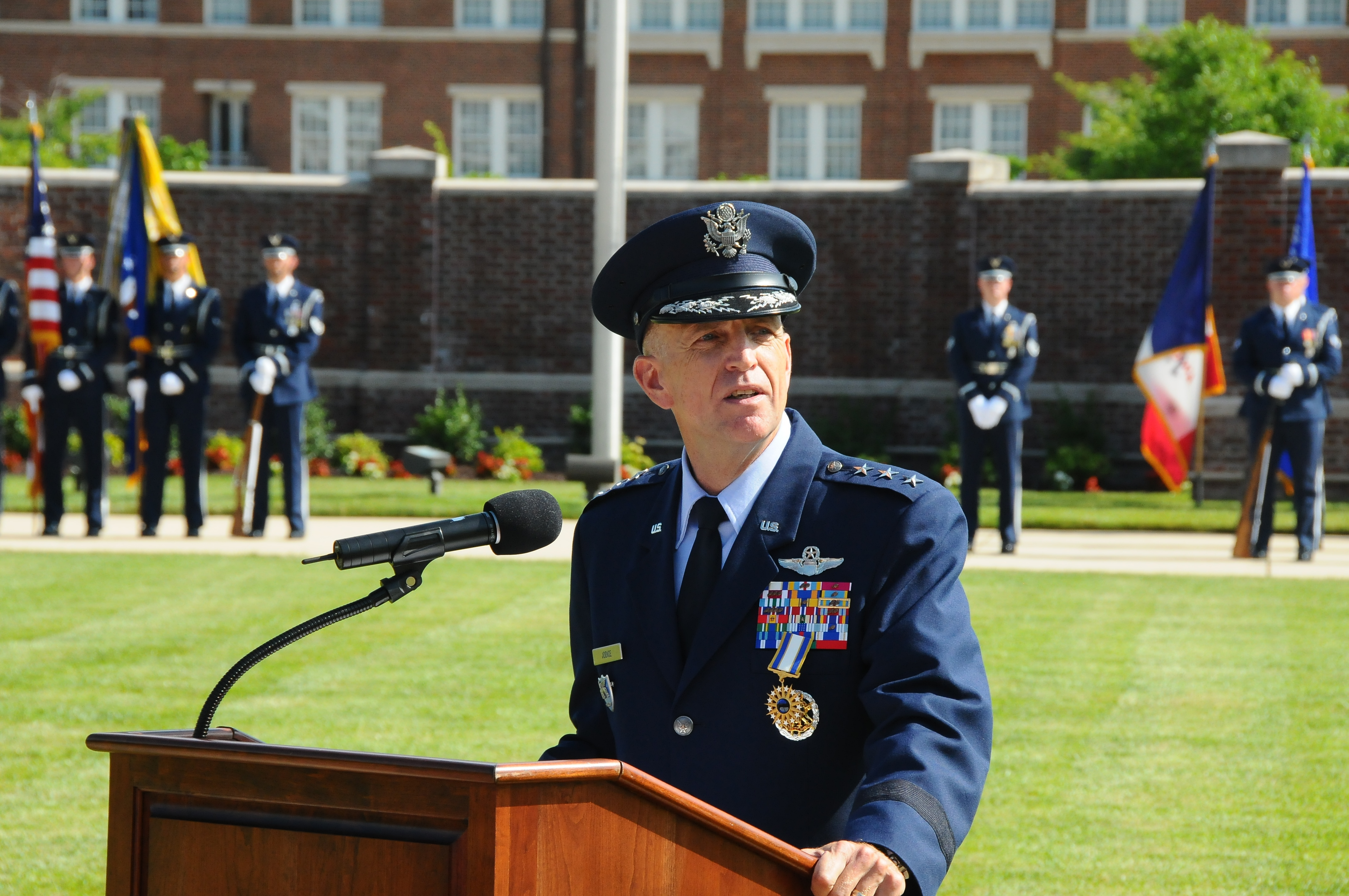
Lt. Gen. Ralph Jodice with all his medals on uniform during his retirement ceremony on June 28, 2013.

US Air Force Command Pilot Badge
Air Force Distinguished Service Medal	Defense Superior Service Medal	Legion of Merit
Meritorious Service Medal	Air Medal	Aerial Achievement Medal
Joint Service Commendation Medal	Air Force Commendation Medal	Joint Meritorious Unit Award
Air Force Outstanding Unit Award	Bronze Star Medal	Combat Readiness Medal
National Defense Service Medal	Southwest Asia Service Medal	Global War on Terrorism Service Medal
Korea Defense Service Medal	Air Force Overseas Short Tour Service Ribbon	Air Force Overseas Long Tour Service Ribbon
Air Force Longevity Service Award	Air Force Training Ribbon	NATO Meritorious Service Medal
Non-Article 5 NATO Medal (Operation Unified Protector)	Kuwait Liberation Medal	Legion of Honor
Office of the Joint Chiefs of Staff Identification Badge

== Notes ==
Military offices
Preceded by Maurice L. McFann, Jr.	Commander of NATO Allied Air Command İzmir; 2009–2013	Command disestablished
Preceded by Frank Gorenc	Commander of Air Force District of Washington; 2008–2009	Next: Darrell D. Jones
Preceded by Richard J. Mauldin	Defense Attaché, U.S. Embassy, Beijing; 2004–2007	Next: Charles W. Hooper
