= Robert E. Hogaboom =

United States Marine Corps general

Robert Edward Hogaboom
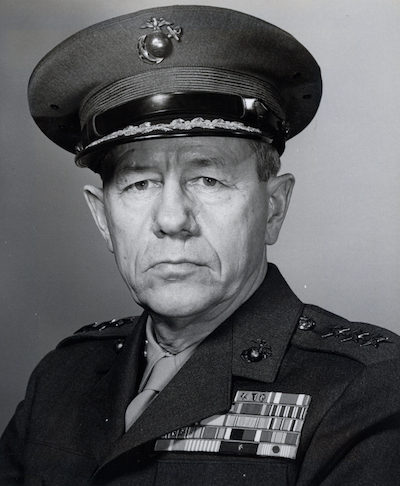
- General Robert E. Hogaboom
- Born: November 13, 1902; Meridian, Mississippi, U.S.
- Died: November 11, 1993 (aged 90); St. Mary's City, Maryland, U.S.
- Military career
- Allegiance: United States of America
- Branch: United States Marine Corps
- Service years: 1925–1959
- Rank: General
- Nickname: "Hoge"
- Commands: Chief of Staff, HQMC; 1st Marine Division
- Conflicts: Nicaraguan Campaign; Yangtze Patrol; World War II: Aleutian Islands Campaign; Battle of Tarawa; Battle of Kwajalein; Battle of Saipan; Battle of Tinian; Battle of Guam; Battle of Iwo Jima; Korean War
- Awards: Legion of Merit (3); Navy Commendation Medal

Robert Edward Hogaboom (November 13, 1902 – November 11, 1993) was a decorated United States Marine Corps four-star general who served as chief of staff, Headquarters, U.S. Marine Corps between 1957 and 1959. Hogaboom was promoted to four-star rank upon retirement as a "tombstone general".

Hogaboom was also a lead member of so-called "Chowder Society", special Marine Corps Board, which was tasked to conduct research and prepare material relative to postwar legislation concerning the role of the Marine Corps in national defense.

== Early career ==
Robert Edward Hogaboom was born on November 13, 1902, in Meridian, Mississippi, as the son of late Army Colonel George E. Hogaboom and former Mary Mayerhoff. He graduated from Marion Military Institute in Marion, Alabama, in summer of 1920 and enrolled the Mississippi State College in Starkville. Hogaboom completed two years before received an appointment to the United States Naval Academy at Annapolis, Maryland.

During his time at the academy, "Hoge" was a member of the boxing team and also was designated Expert Rifleman. He graduated on June 4, 1925, with bachelor's degree and was commissioned a second lieutenant in the United States Marine Corps. Some of his classmates also became general officers in the Marine Corps: Francis H. Brink, Lionel C. Goodeau, Harold D. Harris, John N. Hart or James Snedeker.

Hogaboom was subsequently ordered to the Basic School at the Philadelphia Navy Yard for basic officer training, which he completed five months later. He then joined the 1st Battalion, 5th Marines at Quantico, Virginia and embarked for Guantanamo Bay, Cuba. Hogaboom has returned to the United States in September of that year and was ordered to Richmond, Virginia, where he took part in the Mail guard duty during a nationwide wave of mail robberies.

He embarked with 1st Marine Brigade for expeditionary duty to Nicaragua in February 1927 and spent almost three years in that country. Hogaboom took part in the jungle patrols against hostile bandits under Augusto César Sandino and later served as an instructor with Nicaraguan Constabulary, Guardia Nacional. For his service in that country, he was decorated with Nicaraguan Presidential Medal of Merit with Diploma.

Following his return stateside in early 1930, he served at Marine Corps Base San Diego at the Recruit Depot and later completed the Sea School. Hogaboom then joined the Marine detachment aboard the cruiser USS Chicago and took part in the gunnery exercises preliminary to Fleet Problem XIII off the California coast.

Hogaboom was detached in summer 1933 and attended the Army Cavalry School at Fort Riley, Kansas. Upon his graduation in June 1934, he was ordered to the Marine Corps Schools, Quantico and served as an instructor there until early 1937, when he was transferred to 4th Marine Regiment and sailed for China.

He was stationed at Shanghai International Settlement under the command of Colonel Joseph C. Fegan and participated in the guard duties during a period of tensions between China and Japan. Hogaboom was ordered back to the United States in 1939 and ordered back to the staff of Marine Corps Schools, Quantico as an instructor. During his second tour at Quantico, he was deeply involved in the development of the amphibious warfare doctrine, its tactics and techniques.

== World War II ==
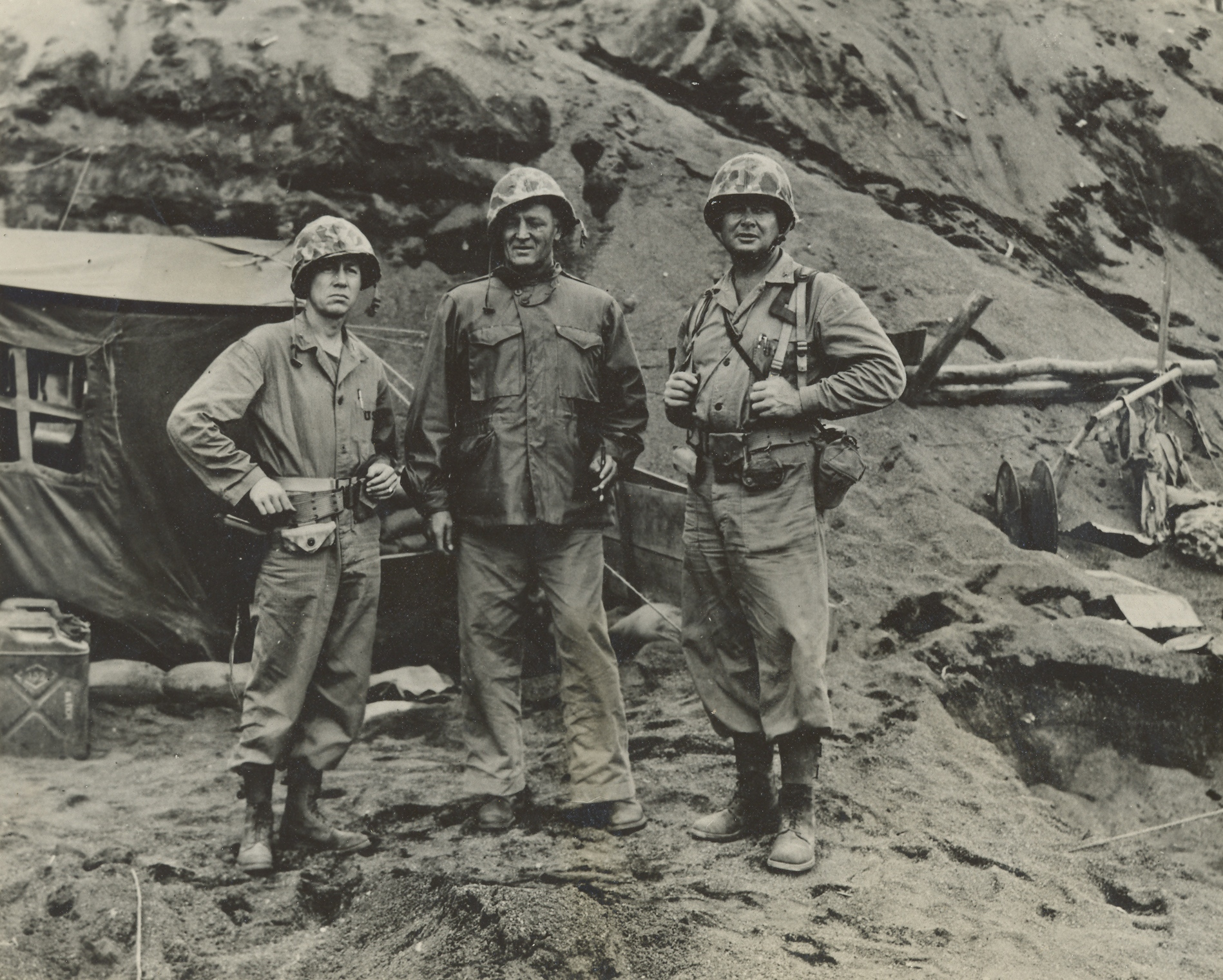
From left to right: Hogaboom (Chief of Staff, 3rd Marine Division); Major General Graves B. Erskine (Commanding general, 3rd Marine Division) and Colonel John B. Wilson (acting Assistant Commanding general, 3rd Marine Division) near the field command post on Iwo Jima, February 1945.

During his service at Quantico, commanding general of the Marine Corps Base, Major General Holland Smith, noticed the Hogaboom's qualities as staff officer and brilliant instructor and when he received orders to assume command of Amphibious Corps, Pacific Fleet in San Diego, he requested Hogaboom to be assign to his staff.

Hogaboom was promoted to lieutenant colonel and ordered to San Diego in September 1942 for duty on the staff of Amphibious Corps, Pacific Fleet under Major General Holland Smith. He was appointed assistant operations officer (G-3) and was put in charge of the amphibious training of Army 7th Infantry Division at Fort Ord, California. Hogaboom coordinated the training of the division for the ongoing Aleutian Islands Campaign and later served as an observer during the amphibious landing at Attu in May 1943. For his service in this capacity, he was decorated with the Navy Commendation Medal. He was, meanwhile, promoted to the temporary rank of colonel in November 1942.

In November 1943, Commander of Fifth Amphibious Force, Rear Admiral Richmond K. Turner, requested a more experienced Marine officer to be assigned to his staff. Admiral Turner, known as "Terrible Turner" because of his furious temper, wrote a letter to the commandant, Thomas Holcomb, demanding a substitute for his assistant chief of staff for operations, Colonel Joseph W. Knighton. Holcomb asked Holland Smith for a substitute, and he chose Hogaboom.

He later described his experiences under Turner:

The greatness of Admiral Kelly Turner was in that Kelly Turner worked his plans out in minute detail himself, right down to the last position of every amphibious vessel; where they would be, when they should be there, what they were to do. I knew him personally and I know that he was a fighting man. He was tough...he was not always fair, but he insisted on his people doing what they were supposed to do.

Hogaboom served as assistant chief of staff for operations and training, with additional duty as Smith's liaison officer and participated in the combat operations in Gilbert and Marshall Islands and in the Marianas. He remained in this capacity until mid-October 1944 and was decorated with the Legion of Merit with Combat "V" for his service in that capacity.

He was subsequently transferred to Guam and appointed chief of staff, 3rd Marine Division under Major General Graves B. Erskine. Hogaboom knew Erskine well from his time under General Smith in the Aleutians and thus the cooperation worked well. Hogaboom took part in the planning of Iwo Jima campaign and the landing itself in February 1945 and earned his second Legion of Merit for his service.

== Postwar service ==
=== Marines & Helicopters ===
Following the war, Hogaboom took part in the occupation of Japan and returned to the United States in December 1945 for duty as a director of the Amphibious Warfare School at the Marine Corps Schools, Quantico under Brigadier General Oliver P. Smith.

Hogaboom received orders from the commandant, Alexander Vandegrift, to form and head the committee of the academic board, which conducted research on the desired characteristics for an assault transport helicopter. He and his board concluded, that "On the premise that the helicopter offers a valuable means of accelerating and dispersing the ship-to-shore movement, it is recognized that the complete replacement of all existing ship-to-shore conveyances may at some future date be desirable. Under such conditions, it would appear necessary that there be designed a relatively small type helicopter for transportation of assault troops, as well as large type helicopter capable of lifting all divisional loads. However, examination of current technical developments indicates that the latter type may not be practical for some time to come. Accordingly, it is considered more realistic to approach the problem in increments, establishing initially the characteristics for a purely assault conveyance...."'

His reports were forwarded to the Deputy Chief of Naval Operations for Air, Vice Admiral Donald B. Duncan, who distributed it through the command structure of the navy. Hogaboom and his effort helped to promote the use helicopters for future combat operations.

=== Chowder Society ===
Hogaboom later became a member of the so-called "Chowder Society", special Marine Corps Board under general Gerald C. Thomas, which was tasked by Commandant Alexander Vandegrift to conduct research and prepare material relative to postwar legislation concerning the role of the Marine Corps in national defense. Due to cuts in Marine Corps budget, the threat of merging of the Marine Corps into the United States Army, was more realistic. Also thanks to his work, he is one of the few men, who helped the future of the Corps.

While in this assignment, Hittle had the opportunity to cooperate with great names of modern Marine history such as: Merrill B. Twining, Victor H. Krulak, Merritt A. Edson, Samuel R. Shaw, James E. Kerr, James C. Murray, Jonas M. Platt, DeWolf Schatzel, James D. Hittle, Robert D. Heinl, Edward H. Hurst or Marine Corps Reserve officers John R. Blandford, Arthur B. Hanson, Lyford Hutchins, and William McCahill.

=== General's duty ===
Hogaboom was ordered to Washington, D.C., in June 1949 and attended the National War College, where he graduated one year later. He then served on its staff until his promotion to the rank of brigadier general on July 1, 1951. He was subsequently appointed Marine Corps liaison officer in the Office of the Chief of Naval Operations under Admiral William M. Fechteler and remained in that capacity until July 1952, when he was transferred to Camp Lejeune, North Carolina for duty as assistant division commander, 2nd Marine Division under future commandant Randolph M. Pate.

While in this capacity, Hogaboom twice commanded multi-nation NATO landing forces in Mediterranean maneuvers. As Commanding General of the Landing Force in Operation Longstep in November 1952, he directed U.S. Marines, French, Greek and Italian Forces in landings on the coast of Turkey. In Operation Weldfast in October 1953, British, Greek and Italian troops joined the Marines under his command.

When General Pate was ordered to Korea in May 1953, Hogaboom assumed temporary command of the division and held it for one month, when new commanding general, George F. Good Jr., relieved him. He then resumed his duties as assistant division commander and remained in that capacity until January 1954, when he was transferred to the same capacity with 1st Marine Division in Korea.

The 1st Marine Division served under General Pate in the Korean Demilitarized Zone and because truce was already in effect, there was no major fighting at the time. Hogaboom was promoted to major general in July 1954 and assumed command of the division at that time. He was decorated with his third Legion of Merit for his service in Korea and also received Republic of Korea Gukseon Medal.

=== Hogaboom's Board ===
Upon arrival to the United States in January 1955, Hogaboom was ordered to the Headquarters Marine Corps, where he assumed duty as deputy chief of staff for plans. While in this capacity, he formed the Fleet Marine Force Organization and Composition Board which studied and came up with recommendations for revised tables of organization of Marine Corps units, among other things. Hogaboom selected 16 other high-ranking officers (among them were brigadier generals Ronald D. Salmon and Edward C. Dyer or Colonels Odell M. Conoley, Frederick P. Henderson, Lewis W. Walt, Norman J. Anderson, William K. Jones or Keith B. McCutcheon) and conducted a thorough and comprehensive study of the entire Fleet Marine Force (FMF), including aviation, with the purpose of making recommendations for the optimum organization, composition, and equipment of the FMF. The results of this organization and composition study were to set the pattern for all major organizational changes within the FMF during the remaining part of the decade.

Hogaboom was promoted to lieutenant general in December 1957 and appointed chief of staff, Headquarters Marine Corps by his old superior, now Commandant of the Marine Corps, Randolph M. Pate. He remained in that capacity until October 30, 1959, when retired after 34 years of active service and was advanced to the rank of general for having been specially commended in combat.

== Retirement ==
Following the retirement from the Marine Corps, Hogaboom settled in St. Mary's City, Maryland, where he was active in civic affairs and also served as chairman of the St. Mary's City Commission, a historic preservation group. He was also active in the Marine Corps Historical Foundation, where he served as a member of the board of directors.

General Robert E. Hogaboom died on November 11, 1993, following complications of Alzheimer's disease and was buried in the cemetery of Trinity Episcopal Church. He was married twice, first time to Jean Galpin Lowe (1908–1979) and then to Maurine Holbert (1912–2010).

The Marine Corps Association's Marine Corps Gazette General Robert E. Hogaboom Leadership Writing Contest is named in his honor.

== Decorations and honors ==
General Hogaboom's medals and decorations include:

1st row	Legion of Merit with Combat "V" and two 5/16" Gold Stars	Navy and Marine Corps Commendation Medal	Navy Presidential Unit Citation	Navy Unit Commendation
2nd row	Second Nicaraguan Campaign Medal	China Service Medal	American Defense Service Medal	American Campaign Medal
3rd row	Asiatic-Pacific Campaign Medal with six 3/16 inch service stars	World War II Victory Medal	Navy Occupation Service Medal	National Defense Service Medal
4th row	Korean Service Medal	Nicaraguan Presidential Medal of Merit with Diploma	Order of National Security Merit (Republic of Korea), Gukseon Medal	United Nations Korea Medal

== See also ==
- List of United States Marine Corps four-star generals
