= Maurizio Lazzaro de Castiglioni =

Italian general

- Born: March 23, 1888; Milan, Kingdom of Italy
- Died: 1962 (age 74); Rome, Italy
- Relatives: Carolina de' Castiglioni (great-granddaughter)
- Military career
- Allegiance: Kingdom of Italy; Italy
- Branch: Royal Italian Army; Italian Army
- Service years: 1910–1952
- Rank: Lieutenant General
- Commands: "Edolo" Alpini Battalion; 2nd Alpini Regiment; 5th Alpine Division "Pusteria"; Palermo Territorial Military Command; Internal Security Division "Aosta"; Padua Territorial Military Command; Verona Territorial Military Command; Allied Land Forces Southern Europe
- Conflicts: Italo-Turkish War; World War I; White War; World War II; Italian occupation of France
- Awards: Silver Medal of Military Valor (twice); Bronze Medal of Military Valor (three times); Order of Merit of the Italian Republic; Military Order of Savoy; Order of the Crown of Italy; Colonial Order of the Star of Italy; Croix de guerre 1914-1918 (France); Military Cross

Maurizio Lazzaro de Castiglioni (Milan, 23 March 1888 – Rome, 1962) was an Italian general during World War II. From 1940 to 1942 he was head of the Operations Office of the General Staff of the Royal Italian Army. After the war he became commander of the Allied Land Forces Southern Europe in 1951–1952.

== Biography ==
He was born in Milan on March 23, 1888, and after attending the Military Academy of Modena he graduated with the rank of second lieutenant in 1910. In 1911-1912 he fought in Libya during the Italo-Turkish War, serving with the "Edolo" Alpini Battalion and being awarded a Silver Medal of Military Valor (for his behavior during an action in Bu Mofer on 10 October 1912) and two bronze medals as well as promotion to lieutenant for merit of war on December 19, 1912.

During the Great War he fought on the Tonale and the Dolomites with the 5th Alpini Regiment; on 25 August 1915 he led the capture of Cima Payer, in the Adamello mountains, and on 14 September he led a bayonet charge which resulted in the capture of Point 2,902, for which he was awarded another silver medal for Military Valor. His unit, known as "Centuria Valcamonica", was the protagonist of daring enterprises during the White War until De Castiglioni was seriously wounded by an artillery shell, which resulted in the loss of his right hand. He also suffered toe amputation of several toes due to frostbite. In 1917, after recovering from his wounds, he was assigned to the Supreme Command as a staff officer, with the rank of major; in the final year of the war he served as liaison officer between the Supreme Command and Lord Cavan, commander of the Tenth Army.

After the end of the war, between 1921 and 1922 he attended the Army School of War, and in 1926 he assumed command of the "Edolo" Alpini Battalion. After promotion to colonel in 1934, he held various offices within the War School and the General Staff of the Royal Italian Army, after which he assumed command of the 2nd Alpini Regiment. From 1937 he was assigned to the Ministry of War, and in January 1940 he was promoted to the rank of Brigadier General.

With Italy's entry into the Second World War on 10 June 1940, he assumed the position of Chief of Operations of the General Staff, a post he held for over two years. On 1 October 1942, after promotion to Major General, he assumed command of the 5th Alpine Division "Pusteria", which had recently returned from Yugoslavia and was being reorganized in Liguria, in the La Spezia area. After Operation Anton, the Division was transferred to southern France for occupation duties; during this period, De Castiglioni resisted German demands to hand over Jewish refugees who had fled to his region from German-occupied France, and ordered the head of the French police in the region to release Jews who had been arrested under the Vichy regime. After the Armistice of Cassibile he managed to escape capture by German troops and reached southern Italy, where he resumed service with the Ministry of War, participating in the reconstruction of the Italian Co-belligerent Army.

After the end of the war he was promoted to the rank of lieutenant general and held the posts of territorial military commander of Palermo, commander of the "Aosta" Internal Security Division in Messina, territorial military commander of Padua and then of Verona. In 1951 he became Commander of Allied Land Forces Southern Europe, but retired due reaching age limit on 30 August 1952. De Castiglioni had two sons, Vittorio and Camillo de'Castiglioni. Camillo had three children, Marzia, Alberto and Nicolò, whose daughter is Carolina de' Castiglioni, an accomplished actress and writer.

He died in Rome in 1962.
