= Allied Joint Force Command Naples =

NATO command

Coordinates: 40°55′49.4″N 14°02′48.2″E

- Coat of arms
- Founded: 15 March 2004
- Type: Operational level command
- Role: Planning and conducting military operations
- Part of: Allied Command Operations
- Headquarters: Lago Patria (Giugliano in Campania), Naples, Italy
- Website: jfcnaples.nato.int

Commanders
- Commander: Admiral George M. Wikoff; United States Navy
- Deputy Commander: Lieutenant general Peter K. Scott; Canadian Army
- Chief of Staff: Generale di corpo d'armata Rodolfo Sganga; Italian Army

The Joint Force Command Naples (abbr. JFC Naples) is a NATO military command based in Lago Patria, a locality in the municipality of Giugliano in Campania, in the Metropolitan City of Naples, Italy. It was activated on 15 March 2004, after effectively redesigning its predecessor command, Allied Forces Southern Europe (AFSOUTH), originally formed in 1951. In NATO Military Command Structure terms, AFSOUTH was a "Major Subordinate Command". The commander of JFC Naples reports to the Supreme Allied Commander Europe at the Supreme Headquarters Allied Powers Europe, Casteau, Belgium.

As of 2008, Commander, Allied Joint Force Command Naples, was responsible for conducting the full range of military operations throughout the NATO Area of Responsibility (AOR) and beyond to deter aggression and to contribute to the effective defence of NATO territory and forces, safeguard freedom of the seas and economic lifelines and to preserve or restore the security of NATO nations.

== History ==
Arms of Headquarters, Allied Forces Southern Europe

Originally, Allied Forces Southern Europe was one of two major NATO commands in the Mediterranean area, the other being Allied Forces Mediterranean based on the island of Malta, responsible for naval activities in the region. While Admiral Robert B. Carney of the U.S. Navy was appointed as Commander-in-Chief Allied Forces Southern Europe (CinCAFSOUTH) on 19 June 1951, AFMED was not activated until 1953. The delay was due to negotiations and compromises between the Americans and the British, who wished to retain one of their commanders over Britain's traditional sea lines of communication stretching through the Mediterranean to the Suez Canal and beyond. From 1951 to 2003, the Commander-in-Chief of Allied Forces Southern Europe was always a United States Navy admiral, based at Naples, who also held the US Navy position of Commander-in-Chief United States Naval Forces Europe and functioned as the Navy service component commander for United States European Command within the US-only chain of command. AFSOUTH headquarters was established at Bagnoli, Naples.

The initial command arrangements for AFSOUTH consisted of the classic three land, sea, and air headquarters preferred by Eisenhower. Allied Land Forces Southern Europe (LANDSOUTH), Allied Naval Forces Southern Europe (NAVSOUTH), and Allied Air Forces Southern Europe (AIRSOUTH) were all established in Italy. Greece and Turkey joined the alliance in early 1952. On 8 September 1952, a new allied land command, Allied Land Forces South-Eastern Europe (LANDSOUTHEAST), was created with its headquarters in İzmir, Turkey, under the command of a U.S. officer, Lieutenant General Willard G. Wyman. Under this command, with its headquarters in İzmir assisted by the subordinate Thessaloniki Advanced Command Post, were to be most of the Greek and Turkish armies in case of war.

The first AIRSOUTH commander became U.S. Major General David M. Schlatter, USAF. On 14 October 1953, the Sixth Allied Tactical Air Force was also established in İzmir, commanded by Major General R.E.L. Easton, USAF, and responsible to Allied Air Forces Southern Europe for the air defence of Greece and Turkey. Three national air Commands were assigned to it: the Turkish 1st and 3rd Tactical Air Forces, and the Greek Air Force's Royal Hellenic 28th Tactical Air Force. In terms of actual forces, this meant two Greek wings, four Turkish fighter-bomber groups of F-84 aircraft, and some B-26A Mosquitoes.

Later in 1953, the various national naval forces within Allied Forces Mediterranean were organised into six Sub-Principal Subordinate Commands (Sub-PSCs), each commanded by an Admiral (including one French (MEDOC), one Greek, one Turkish, one Italian and two British). In time of war, CINCAFMED would be responsible for securing the Sea lines of communications throughout the Mediterranean Sea.

Some of AFSOUTH's first exercises took place in 1952. Operation Ancient Wall was a series of military maneuvers involving ground small unit tactical training, land-based tactical air support, and carrier-based air support under the overall command of Admiral Carney. Exercise Grand Slam was a combined naval exercise held in the Mediterranean Sea between 25 February to 16 March 1952. The exercise included allied warships escorting three convoys of supply ships which were subjected to repeated simulated air and submarine attacks, as well as anti-submarine warfare (ASW) operations and naval gunfire shore bombardment. Operation Longstep was a ten-day naval exercise held in the Mediterranean Sea held during November 1952. It involved over 170 warships and 700 aircraft, and it featured a large-scale amphibious assault along the western coast of Turkey.

1953 AFSOUTH exercises included:

- "Italic Weld" — a combined air-naval-ground exercise in northern Italy involving the United States, Italy, Turkey, and Greece
- "Weldfast" — a combined amphibious landing exercise in the Mediterranean Sea involving British, Greek, Italian, Turkish, and U.S. naval forces

In 1957, Operation Deep Water simulated the defence of the Dardanelles from a Soviet attack. The exercise included an 8,000-strong amphibious landing.

The drawdown of the British Mediterranean Fleet, the military difficulties of the politically-decided command structure, and the withdrawal of the French from the military command structure forced a rearrangement of the command arrangements in the southern region. Allied Forces Mediterranean was disbanded on 5 June 1967, and all forces in the south and the Mediterranean were assigned to AFSOUTH.

AFSOUTH continued to conduct exercises in the 1960s and 1970s, among which was exercise 'Dawn Patrol,' a five-nation naval and air exercise conducted throughout the Mediterranean in 1974. The U.S. contribution to the exercise was based on the USS America carrier battle group. During the 1960s Exercise Deep Furrow appears to have been held annually. Deep Furrow was conducted from 20–29 September 1973 in the southern region of Allied Command Europe. Forces from Greece, Turkey and other countries in AF South Command participated. Land forces held maneuvers in Greek and Turkish Thrace, and naval Force exercised in the Eastern Mediterranean, including the Aegean Sea; naval activities included amphibious and carrier operations. As part of the exercise, ground units were airlifted from their home stations in the United Kingdom and the United States to northwestern Turkey, where Turkish National Forces executed plans for receiving them. Turkish National Forces also conducted operations with Hellenic Armed Forces and NATO air units, providing fighter-bomber and reconnaissance support throughout the area of operations. Highlights of the exercise in Turkish Thrace were a multi-national amphibious landing on 25 September 1973 and a multinational airborne operation on 26 September 1973.

From 1967 the overall shape of AFSOUTH did not significantly change until the command was renamed in 2004. There were five principal subordinate commands (PSCs). The number rose to six when Greece was taking part in the military structure; Greece withdrew from the NATO military structure after the Turkish invasion of Cyprus in 1974, and after some behind the scenes negotiating by NATO officials, returned in October 1980. Two land commands, Allied Land Forces Southern Europe and Allied Land Forces Southeastern Europe, were tasked to defend Italy and Turkey, respectively. Each was directly responsible to Commander-in-Chief, AFSOUTH, and supported by a tactical air force, Fifth Allied Tactical Air Force in Italy and Sixth Allied Tactical Air Force in Turkey. The two allied tactical air forces were under an overall air command, Allied Air Forces Southern Europe, headquartered at Naples in Italy under a United States Air Force officer, ComAirSouth, responsible himself to CinCAFSOUTH.

Due to political considerations, command of the naval forces in the region was split. Allied Naval Forces Southern Europe, at Naples, operated most of the NATO allies' naval forces in the Mediterranean under an Italian admiral. But due to the U.S. desire to retain control of their nuclear-armed naval forces, the United States Sixth Fleet reported directly to CinCAFSOUTH, supported by a separate headquarters named Naval Striking and Support Forces Southern Europe (STRIKFORSOUTH).

The sixth command was an Allied command responsible for the land defence of Greece, named Allied Land Forces South-Central Europe or LANDSOUTHCENT. However, it is not certain whether it was ever actually operational, with the 1998/99 NATO Handbook listing it as 'yet to be activated.' Below these PSCs were smaller headquarters such as Maritime Air Forces, Mediterranean, at Sigonella, Sicily, responsible for the coordination of the aerial anti-submarine effort, Submarine Forces, South.

=== Structure in 1989 ===
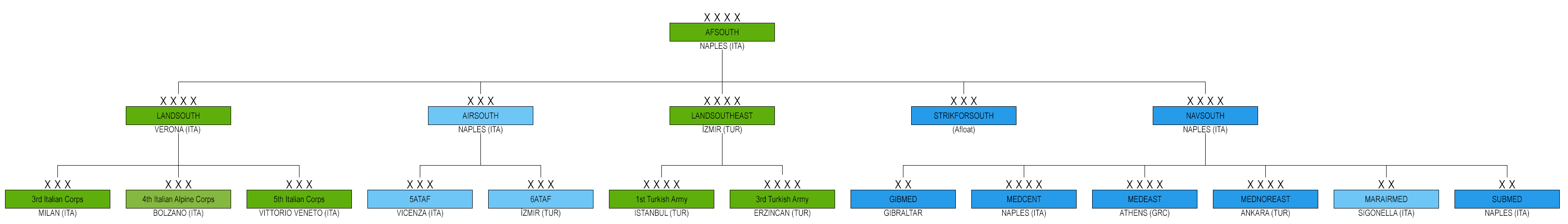
Command Structure of AFSOUTH in 1989 (click to enlarge)

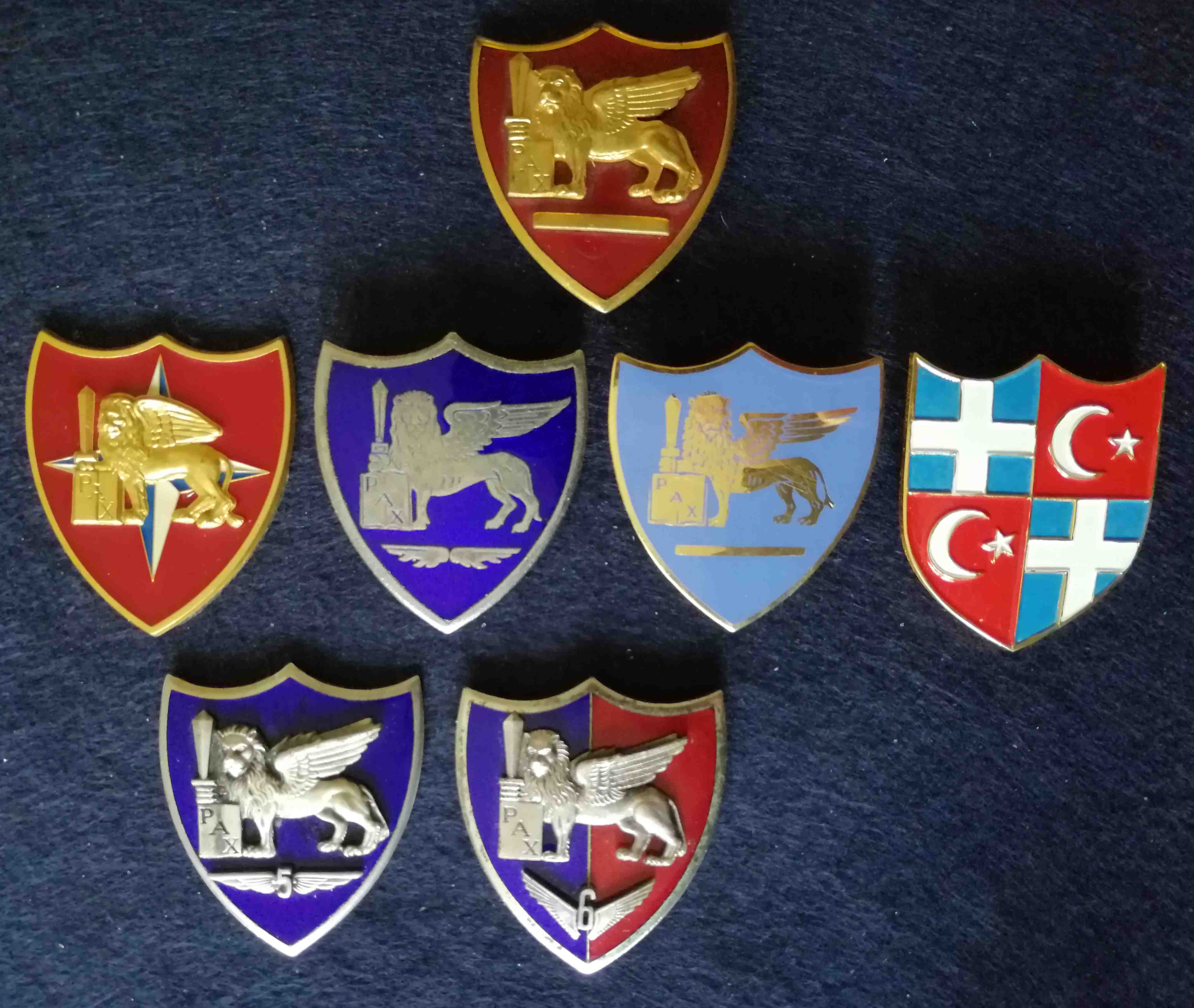
Badges of NATO Commands assigned to AFSOUTH

At the end of the Cold War AFSOUTH consisted of the following commands:

- Allied Forces Southern Europe (AFSOUTH), in Naples, Italy
  - Allied Land Forces Southern Europe (LANDSOUTH), in Verona, Italy
    - 3rd Italian Corps, in Milan
    - 4th Italian Alpine Corps, in Bolzano
    - 5th Italian Corps, in Vittorio Veneto
    - Earmarked Portuguese Mixed Brigade
  - Allied Land Forces South-Eastern Europe (LANDSOUTHEAST), in İzmir, Turkey
    - 1st Turkish Army, in Istanbul
    - 3rd Turkish Army, in Erzincan
  - Allied Land Forces South-Central Europe (LANDSOUTHCENT) in Larissa, Greece
  - Allied Air Forces Southern Europe (AIRSOUTH), in Naples, Italy
    - Fifth Allied Tactical Air Force (5 ATAF), in Vicenza, Italy
    - Sixth Allied Tactical Air Force (6 ATAF), in İzmir, Turkey
    - Seventh Allied Tactical Air Force (7 ATAF) in Larissa, Greece, a planned command for the Greek Air Force, but never actually established
  - Allied Naval Forces Southern Europe (NAVSOUTH), in Naples, Italy, with the following national commands:
    - Commander Gibraltar Mediterranean (COMGIBMED), in Gibraltar, under a Royal Navy Rear Admiral, who doubled as Commander British Forces Gibraltar. British plans, to Captain Peter Melson (RN)'s knowledge in 1990 "committed no forces to defence of the Strait, while Spain was willing to commit substantial elements of their ORBAT [order of battle, their armed forces]."
    - Commander Western Mediterranean (COMMEDWEST), under a French Navy admiral, until 1962 in Algiers, then Toulon, after France left NATO's integrated command structure in 1966 the command was absorbed by NAVSOUTH
    - Commander Central Mediterranean (COMEDCENT), in Naples, under an Italian Navy admiral
    - Commander Eastern Mediterranean (COMEDEAST), in Athens, under a Hellenic Navy admiral
    - Commander South-Eastern Mediterranean (COMMEDSOUTHEAST), under a British admiral in Malta, after the disbanding of the Mediterranean Fleet, the command was absorbed by NAVSOUTH
    - Commander North-eastern Mediterranean (COMEDNOREAST), in Ankara, under a Turkish Naval Forces admiral (includes the Black Sea)
    - Commander Maritime Air Forces Mediterranean (COMMARAIRMED), at Naval Air Station Sigonella, Italy, under Commander US Navy Fleet Air Wing Mediterranean
    - Commander Submarines Mediterranean (COMSUBMED), in Naples, under Commander US Navy Submarine Group 8
  - Naval Striking and Support Forces Southern Europe (STRIKFORSOUTH), in Naples, Italy, centered around the US Navy Sixth Fleet

=== Post Cold War ===
From 1992 AFSOUTH was heavily involved in NATO operations in the Balkans, initially with NATO seaborne enforcement of a UN arms embargo, Operation 'Maritime Monitor,' which began in July 1992. This operation was fused with a similar Western European Union effort and thus became Operation Sharp Guard from July 1993. AFSOUTH also directed activities such as Operation Deny Flight from AIRSOUTH headquarters in Italy. Commander-in-Chief AFSOUTH directed the NATO peacekeeping missions in Bosnia & Hercegovina, IFOR and SFOR, from December 1995.

Beginning 10 July 1951, Headquarters Allied Land Forces Southern Europe was responsible for defending the North-Eastern Italian sector in cooperation with other NATO nations. During the intervening 40 years, the HQ produced plans and studies to counter a potential invasion by the Soviet-led Warsaw Pact. After 53 years in the city of Verona, what had become Joint Command South (JCS) closed its doors on 15 June 2004.

=== Establishment as JFC Naples ===
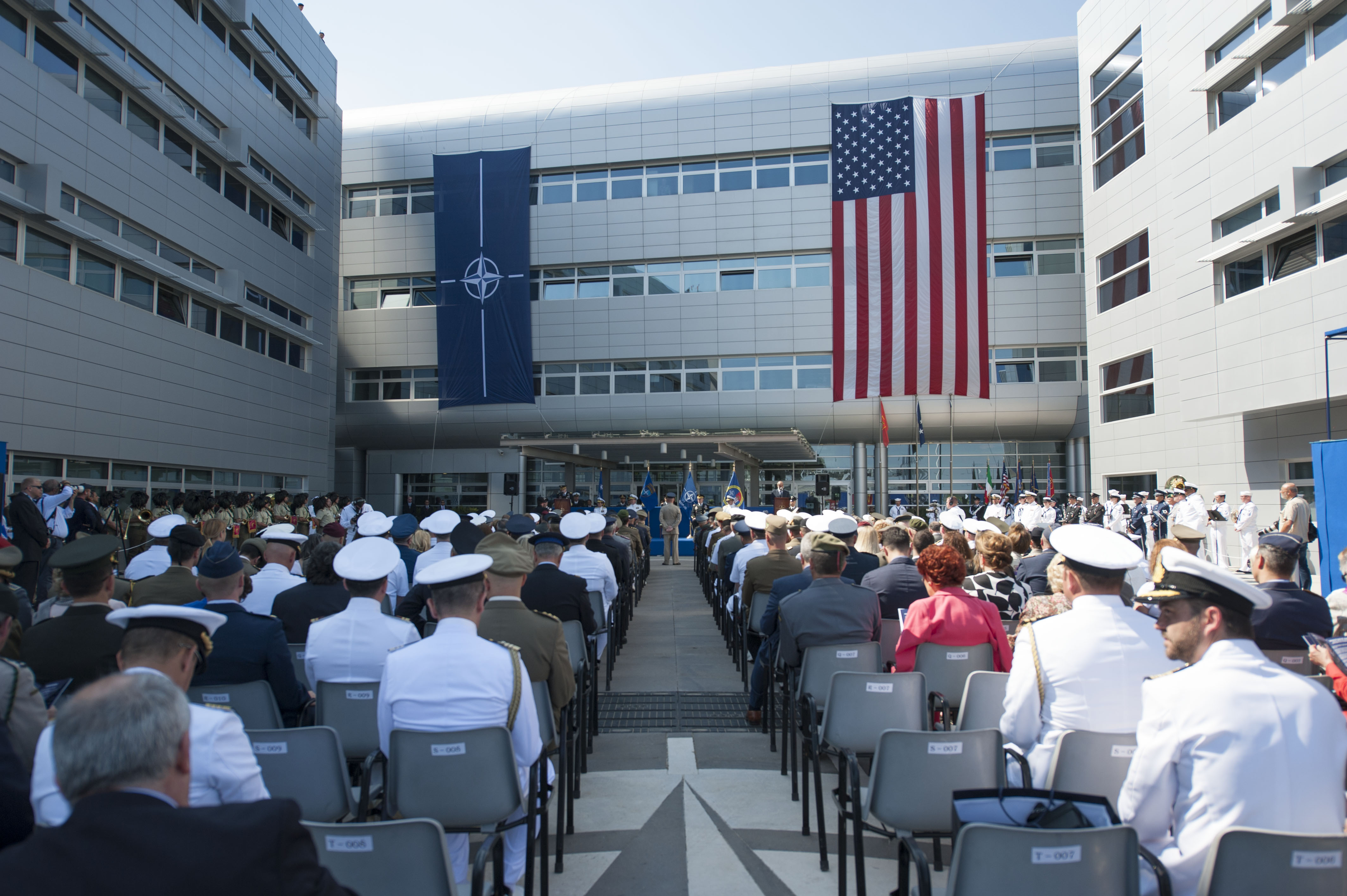
A change of command ceremony is held at the Allied Joint Force Command Naples during 2016

NHQ Sarajevo remains operational, as also NATO Headquarters Tirana, an outgrowth of the former Kosovo Force (KFOR) Communications Zone West, originally established in 1999. Communication Zone West was retitled NHQ Tirana on 17 June 2002.

In 2013 a further command structure reorganisation began to take effect. Allied Maritime Command Naples, Allied Air Command İzmir and Allied Force Command Madrid were all deactivated.

From 2013 Allied Command Operations started directing the Allied Joint Force Command Brunssum and Allied Joint Force Command Naples, and three component commands, Allied Air Command at Ramstein, Germany, Allied Land Command at İzmir, Turkey, and Allied Maritime Command at Northwood, UK.

NATO and Romanian Ministry of Defense representatives activated the Headquarters Multinational Division Southeast (HQ MND-SE) headquarters in Bucharest, Romania, on December 1, 2015.

In February 2026, it was leaked, and subsequently announced by NATO that it would transfer the control of JFC Naples from the current American commander to an Italian commander.
