= Cold War (1947–1948) =

Period within the Cold War

The Cold War from 1947 to 1948 is the period within the Cold War from the Truman Doctrine in 1947 to the incapacitation of the Allied Control Council in 1948. The Cold War emerged in Europe a few years after the successful US–USSR–UK coalition won World War II in Europe, and extended to 1989–1991. It took place worldwide, but it had a partially different timing outside Europe. Some conflicts between the Western world and the USSR appeared earlier. In 1945–1946 the US and UK strongly protested Soviet political takeover efforts in Eastern Europe and Iran, while the hunt for Soviet spies made the tensions more visible. However, historians emphasize the decisive break between the US–UK and the USSR came in 1947–1948 over such issues as the Truman Doctrine, the Marshall Plan and the breakdown of cooperation in governing occupied Germany by the Allied Control Council. In 1947, Bernard Baruch, the multimillionaire financier and adviser to presidents from Woodrow Wilson to Harry S. Truman, coined the term "Cold War" to describe the increasingly chilly relations between three World War II Allies: the United States and British Empire together with the Soviet Union.

The list of world leaders in these years is as follows: Clement Attlee (UK); Harry Truman (US); Joseph Stalin (USSR); Chiang Kai-shek (China).

== Further expansion of communism in Europe ==
Eastern Bloc

Several of the other countries that the Soviet Union occupied that were not directly annexed into the Soviet Union became Soviet satellite states, such as East Germany, the People's Republic of Poland, the People's Republic of Hungary, the Czechoslovak Socialist Republic, the People's Republic of Bulgaria, the People's Republic of Romania and the People's Republic of Albania, which aligned itself in the 1960s away from the Soviet Union and towards the People's Republic of China. Socialist Yugoslavia conducted a fully independent policy, causing tension with the Soviet Union.

In East Germany after local election losses, a forced merger of political parties in the Socialist Unity Party ("SED"), followed by elections in 1946 where political opponents were oppressed. In the non-USSR annexed portion of Poland, less than a third of Poland's population voted in favor of massive communist land reforms and industry nationalizations in a policies referendum known as "3 times YES" (3 razy TAK; 3xTAK), whereupon a second vote rigged election was held to get the desired result. Fraudulent Polish elections held in January 1947 resulted in Poland's official transformation to the People's Republic of Poland.

Initially Stalin directed systems in the Eastern Bloc countries that rejected Western institutional characteristics of market economies, democratic governance (dubbed "bourgeois democracy" in Soviet parlance) and the rule of law subduing discretional intervention by the state. They were economically communist and depended upon the Soviet Union for significant amounts of materials. While in the first three years following World War II, massive emigration from these states to the West occurred, restrictions implemented thereafter stopped most East-West migration, except that under limited bilateral and other agreements.

== Implementation of containment ==
In January 1947 Kennan drafted an essay entitled "The Sources of Soviet Conduct." Navy Secretary James Forrestal gave permission for the report to be published in the journal Foreign Affairs under the pseudonym "X." Biographer Douglas Brinkley has dubbed Forrestal "godfather of containment" on account of his work in distributing Kennan's writing. The use of the word "containment" originates from this so-called "X Article": "In these circumstances it is clear that the main element of any United States policy toward the Soviet Union must be that of long-term, patient but firm and vigilant containment of Russian expansive tendencies."

=== Restatement of Policy on Germany ===
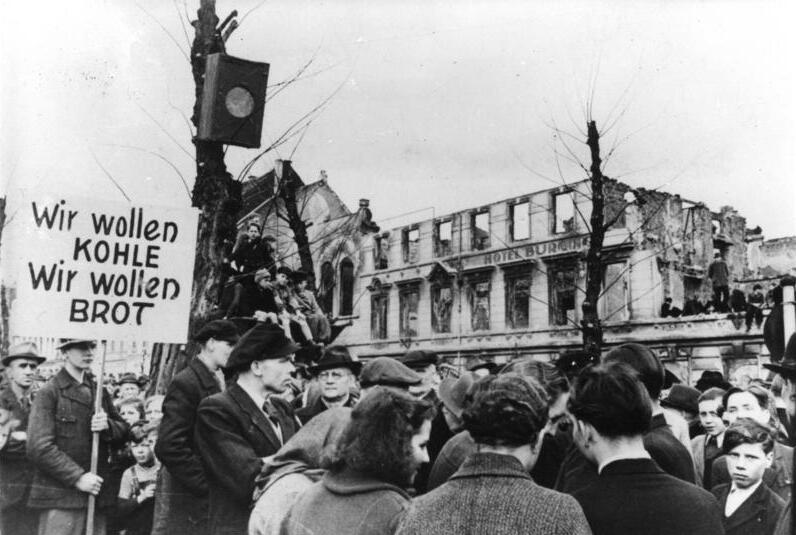
The hunger-winter of 1947 thousands protest in West Germany against the disastrous food situation (March 31, 1947). The sign says: We want coal, we want bread

Having lost 27 million people in the war, the Soviet Union was determined to destroy Germany's capacity for another war, and pushed for such in wartime conferences. The resulting Morgenthau plan policy foresaw returning Germany to a pastoral state without heavy industry. Because of the increasing costs of food imports to avoid mass-starvation in Germany, and with the danger of losing the entire nation to communism, the U.S. government abandoned the Morgenthau plan in September 1946 with Secretary of State James F. Byrnes' speech Restatement of Policy on Germany.

In January 1947 Truman appointed General George Marshall as Secretary of State, and enacted JCS 1779, which decreed that an orderly and prosperous Europe requires the economic contributions of "a stable and productive Germany." The directive comported with the view of General Lucius D. Clay and the Joint Chiefs of Staff over growing communist influence in Germany, as well as of the failure of the rest of the European economy to recover without the German industrial base on which it previously had been dependent. Administration officials met with Soviet Foreign Minister Vyacheslav Molotov and others to press for an economically self-sufficient Germany, including a detailed accounting of the industrial plants, goods and infrastructure already removed by the Soviets. After six weeks of negotiations, Molotov refused the demands and the talks were adjourned. Marshall was particularly discouraged after personally meeting with Stalin, who expressed little interest in a solution to German economic problems. The United States concluded that a solution could not wait any longer.

=== The Greek Civil War and the Truman Doctrine ===
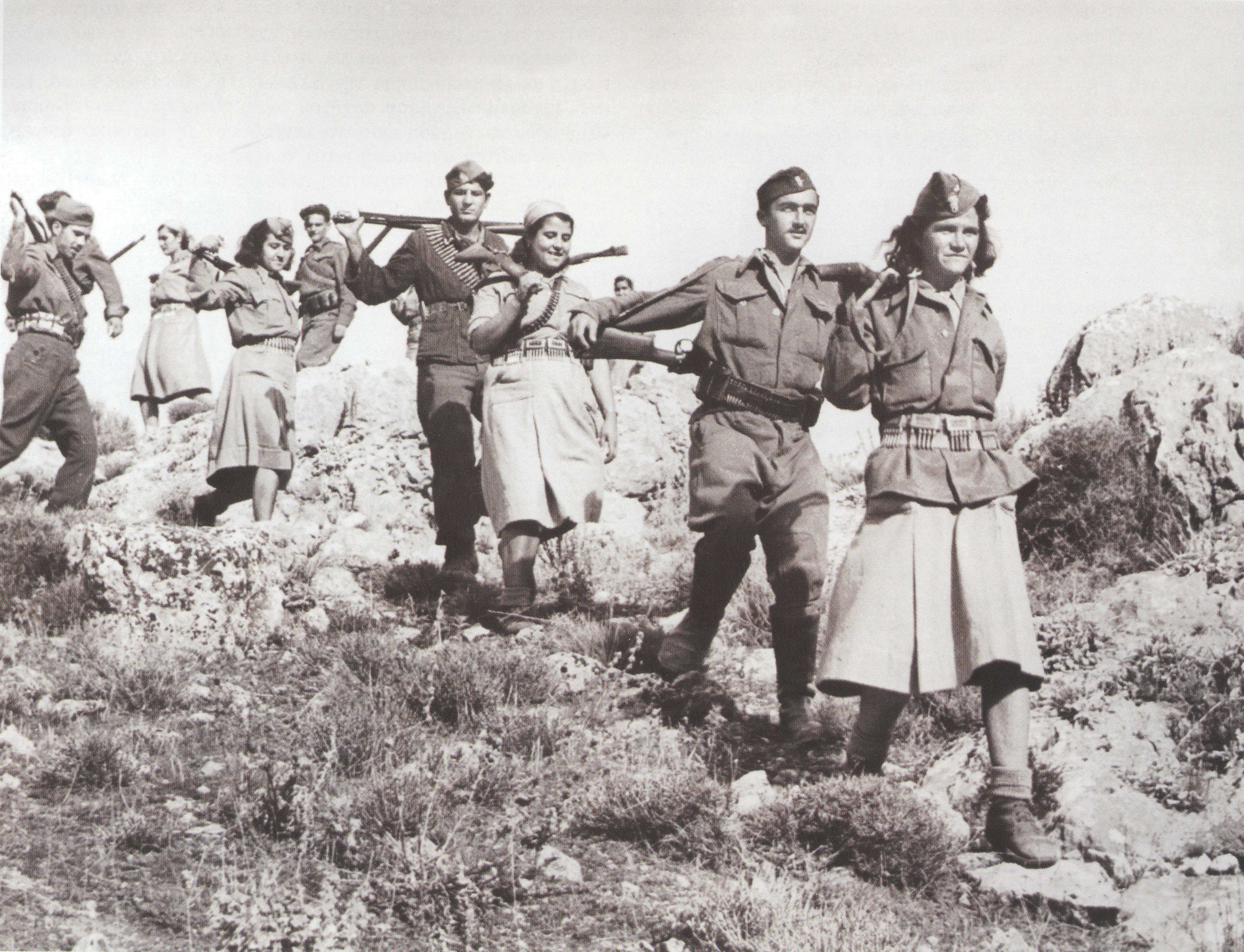
Guerillas of ELAS

Both the East and the West regarded Greece as a nation well within the sphere of influence of Britain. Stalin had respected the "percentages agreement" with Winston Churchill not to intervene, but Yugoslavia and Albania defied the USSR's policy and sent supplies during the Greek Civil War to the army of the Communist Party of Greece, the DSE (Democratic Army of Greece) as a contributing factor to the Tito-Stalin split. The UK had given aid to the royalist Greek forces, leaving the Communists (without Soviet aid and having boycotted the elections) at a disadvantaged position. However, by 1947, the near-bankrupt British government could no longer maintain its massive overseas commitments. In addition to granting independence to India and handing back the Palestinian Mandate to the United Nations, the British government decided to withdraw from Greece. This would have left Greece on the brink of a communist-led revolution.

Notified that British aid to Greece and Turkey would end in less than six weeks, and already hostile towards and suspicious of Soviet intentions, because of their reluctance to withdraw from Iran, the Truman administration decided that additional action was necessary. With Congress solidly in Republican hands, and with isolationist sentiment strong among the U.S. public, Truman adopted an ideological approach. In a meeting with congressional leaders, the argument of "apples in a barrel infected by one rotten one" was used to convince them of the significance in supporting Greece and Turkey. It was to become the "domino theory". On the morning of March 12, 1947, President Harry S. Truman appeared before Congress to ask for $400 million of aid to Greece and Turkey. Calling on congressional approval for the United States to "support free peoples who are resisting attempted subjugation by armed minorities or by outside pressures," or in short a policy of "containment", Truman articulated a presentation of the ideological struggle that became known as the "Truman Doctrine." Although based on a simplistic analysis of internal strife in Greece and Turkey, it became the single dominating influence over U.S. policy until at least the Vietnam War.

Truman's speech had a notable influence on its audience and subsequent events. The anti-communist feelings that had just begun to hatch in the U.S. were given a great boost, and a silenced Congress voted overwhelmingly in approval of aid. The United States would not withdraw back to the Western Hemisphere as it had after World War I. In September, 1947 the Central Committee secretary Andrei Zhdanov declared that "the Truman Doctrine…intended for accordance of the American help to all reactionary regimes, that actively oppose to democratic people, bears an undisguised aggressive character".

From then on, the U.S. actively fought communist advances anywhere in the globe under the ostensible causes of "freedom", "democracy" and "human rights." The U.S. brandished its role as the leader of the "free world." Meanwhile, the Soviet Union brandished its position as the leader of the "progressive" and "anti-imperialist" camp.

=== May 1947 crises, the Marshall Plan and the Czechoslovak coup d'état ===
Comporting with the Truman Doctrine, Marshall pressured France and Italy under the threat of denying any financial aid into purging communists from their governments in the events known as the May 1947 crises. Nevertheless, he subsequently announced in a speech delivered on 5 June 1947 a comprehensive program of American assistance to all European countries wanting to participate, including the Soviet Union and its satellites, called the Marshall Plan. Fearing American political, cultural and economic penetration, Stalin eventually forbade Soviet Eastern bloc countries of the newly formed Cominform (Communist information bureau) from accepting Marshall Plan aid. In Czechoslovakia, that required a Soviet-backed Czechoslovak coup d'état of 1948, the brutality of which shocked Western powers more than any event so far and set in a motion a brief scare that war would occur and swept away the last vestiges of opposition to the Marshall Plan in the United States Congress.

== From animosity to open hostility ==
=== Nazi–Soviet relations and Falsifiers of History ===
Relations further deteriorated when, in January 1948, the U.S. State Department also published a collection of documents titled Nazi–Soviet Relations, 1939–1941: Documents from the Archives of The German Foreign Office, which contained documents recovered from the Foreign Office of Nazi Germany revealing Soviet conversations with Germany regarding the Molotov–Ribbentrop Pact, including its secret protocol dividing eastern Europe, the 1939 German–Soviet Commercial Agreement, and discussions of the Soviet Union potentially becoming the fourth Axis Power.

In response, one month later, the Soviet Union published Falsifiers of History, a Stalin edited and partially re-written book attacking the West. The book did not attempt to directly counter or deal with the documents published in Nazi-Soviet Relations and rather, focused upon Western culpability for the outbreak of war in 1939. It argues that "Western powers" aided Nazi rearmament and aggression, including that American bankers and industrialists provided capital for the growth of German war industries, while deliberately encouraging Hitler to expand eastward. The book also included the claim that, during the Pact's operation, Stalin rejected Hitler's offer to share in a division of the world, without mentioning the Soviet offers to join the Axis. Historical studies, official accounts, memoirs and textbooks published in the Soviet Union used that depiction of events until the Soviet Union's dissolution.

=== Incapacitation of Allied Control Council and breakdown of relations ===
Relations between the Western Allies (especially the United States and the United Kingdom) and the Soviet Union deteriorated and so did their cooperation in the administration of occupied Germany by the Allied Control Council. In September 1946, disagreement arose regarding the distribution of coal for industry in the four occupation zones and the Soviet representative in the council withdrew his support of the plan agreed upon by the governments of the United States, Britain and France. Against Soviet protests, the two English-speaking powers pushed for a heightened economic collaboration between the different zones and on 1 January 1947 the British and American zones merged to form the Bizone. Over the course of 1947 and early 1948, they began to prepare the currency reform that would introduce the Deutsche Mark and ultimately lead to the creation of an independent West German state. When the Soviets learned about this, they claimed that such plans were in violation of the Potsdam Agreement, that obviously the Western powers were not interested in further regular four-power control of Germany and that under such circumstances the Control Council had no further purpose. On 20 March 1948, Marshal Vasily Sokolovsky walked out of the meeting of the council and no further Soviet representative was sent until 1970s, thus incapacitating in practice the council and abandoning any pretense of the World War II alliance's persistence.

== Significant documents ==
The Cold War generated innumerable documents. The texts of 171 documents appear in The Encyclopedia of the Cold War (2008).

- Baruch Plan: 1946. A proposal by the U.S. to the United Nations Atomic Energy Commission (UNAEC) to a) extend between all nations the exchange of basic scientific information for peaceful ends; b) implement control of atomic energy to the extent necessary to ensure its use only for peaceful purposes; c) eliminate from national armaments atomic weapons and all other major weapons adaptable to mass destruction; and d) establish effective safeguards by way of inspection and other means to protect complying States against the hazards of violations and evasions. When the Soviet Union was the only member state which refused to sign, the U.S. embarked on a massive nuclear weapons testing, development, and deployment program.
- The Long Telegram and The "X Article", 1946–1947. Formally titled "The Sources of Soviet Conduct". The article describes the concepts that became the foundation of United States Cold War policy and was published in Foreign Affairs in 1947. The article was an expansion of a well-circulated top secret State Department cable called the X Article and became famous for setting forth the doctrine of containment. Though the article was signed pseudonymously by "X," it was well known at the time that the true author was George F. Kennan, the deputy chief of mission of the United States to the Soviet Union from 1944 to 1946, under ambassador W. Averell Harriman.
- NSC 68: April 14, 1950. A classified report written and issued by the United States National Security Council. The report outlined the National Security Strategy of the United States for that time and provided a comprehensive analysis of the capabilities of the Soviet Union and of the United States from military, economic, political, and psychological standpoints. NSC 68's principal thesis was that the Soviet Union intended to become the single dominant world power. The report argued that the Soviet Union had a systematic strategy aimed at the spread of communism across the entire world, and it recommended that the United States government adopt a policy of containment to stop the further spread of Soviet power. NSC 68 outlined a drastic foreign policy shift from defensive to active containment and advocated aggressive military preparedness. NSC 68 shaped government actions in the Cold War for the next 20 years and has subsequently been labeled the "blueprint" for the Cold War.
- Speech by James F. Byrnes, United States Secretary of State "Restatement of Policy on Germany" Stuttgart September 6, 1946. Also known as the "Speech of hope," it set the tone of future U.S. policy as it repudiated the Morgenthau Plan economic policies and gave the Germans hope for the future. The Western powers worst fear was that the poverty and hunger would drive the Germans to communism. General Lucius Clay stated "There is no choice between being a communist on 1,500 calories a day and a believer in democracy on a thousand". The speech was also seen as a stand against the Soviet Union because it stated the firm intention of the United States to maintain a military presence in Europe indefinitely. But the heart of the message was as Byrnes stated a month later "The nub of our program was to win the German people ... it was a battle between us and Russia over minds".

== See also ==
- Timeline of events in the Cold War
- Animal Farm
