= Cosenz =

Cosenz may refer to:

- Enrico Cosenz (1820–1898), Italian general and politician
  - Enrico Cosenz, a ship earlier known as Italian destroyer Agostino Bertani
- Cosenz, a tributary of the Alpine Rhine river
