= Pietro Serino =

Italian military officer

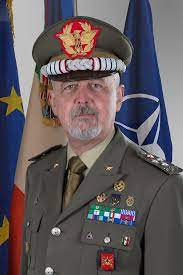
- Pietro Serino
- Born: 3 June 1960 (age 65); Rome
- Allegiance: Italy
- Branch: Esercito Italiano
- Service years: 1976–present
- Rank: Lieutenant General (I.s.)
- Commands: Chief of Army Staff

Pietro Serino (Rome, 3 June 1960) is an Italian general, Chief of Staff of the Italian Army from 26 February 2021 to 26 February 2024.

== Biography ==
=== Background ===
He attended the 1974–77 course of the Nunziatella Military School and the 160th course of the Modena Military Academy, and after the application school he was promoted to lieutenant of the Transmission Corps in 1982. He also attended the Army War School and has a degree in strategic sciences.

=== Military career ===
With the rank of Captain, he served as Company Commander at the 11th Transmission Battalion 'Leonessa' in Civitavecchia. He then commanded the 11th Transmission Battalion 'Leonessa' of the 11th Transmission Regiment and, as a colonel, the 1st Transmission Regiment until 2004, when he was transferred to the General Staff. From 2007 to 2010, he was Military Attaché at the Italian Embassy in Washington, and in 2008 he was promoted to Brigadier general. From 2010 to 2011, he was in command of the Army's Transmission Brigade, and then Head of the Planning Department of the Italian Army Staff. Since 2012, he has been a divisional general and, since 2013, Head of the Planning, Programming and Budget Office of the Defence Staff. On 1 January 2016, he was promoted to the rank of General of Army Corps. Since 1 February 2017 he has been at the head of the Army Training, Specialisation and Doctrine Command.

Since 31 October 2018, he has held the position of Chief of Staff of the Italian Minister of Defence (under Ministers Elisabetta Trenta first and Lorenzo Guerini later).

On 21 February 2021, he was appointed by the Council of Ministers, at the proposal of Minister Guerini, Chief of Staff of the Italian Army and he substituted gen. Salvatore Farina on the following 26 February. On. 27 February 2024 he was substituted by general Carmine Masiello.

== Honors ==
=== Italian honors ===
Cavaliere di Gran Croce dell'Ordine al merito della Repubblica italiana – ribbon for ordinary uniform

Knight Grand Cross of the Order of Merit of the Italian Republic
"Di iniziativa del Presidente della Repubblica"
— 25 febbraio 2021
