= Chief of Staff of the Italian Army =

- Capo di stato maggiore dell'Esercito Italiano (Italian)
- Flag of the Chief of Staff of the Italian Army

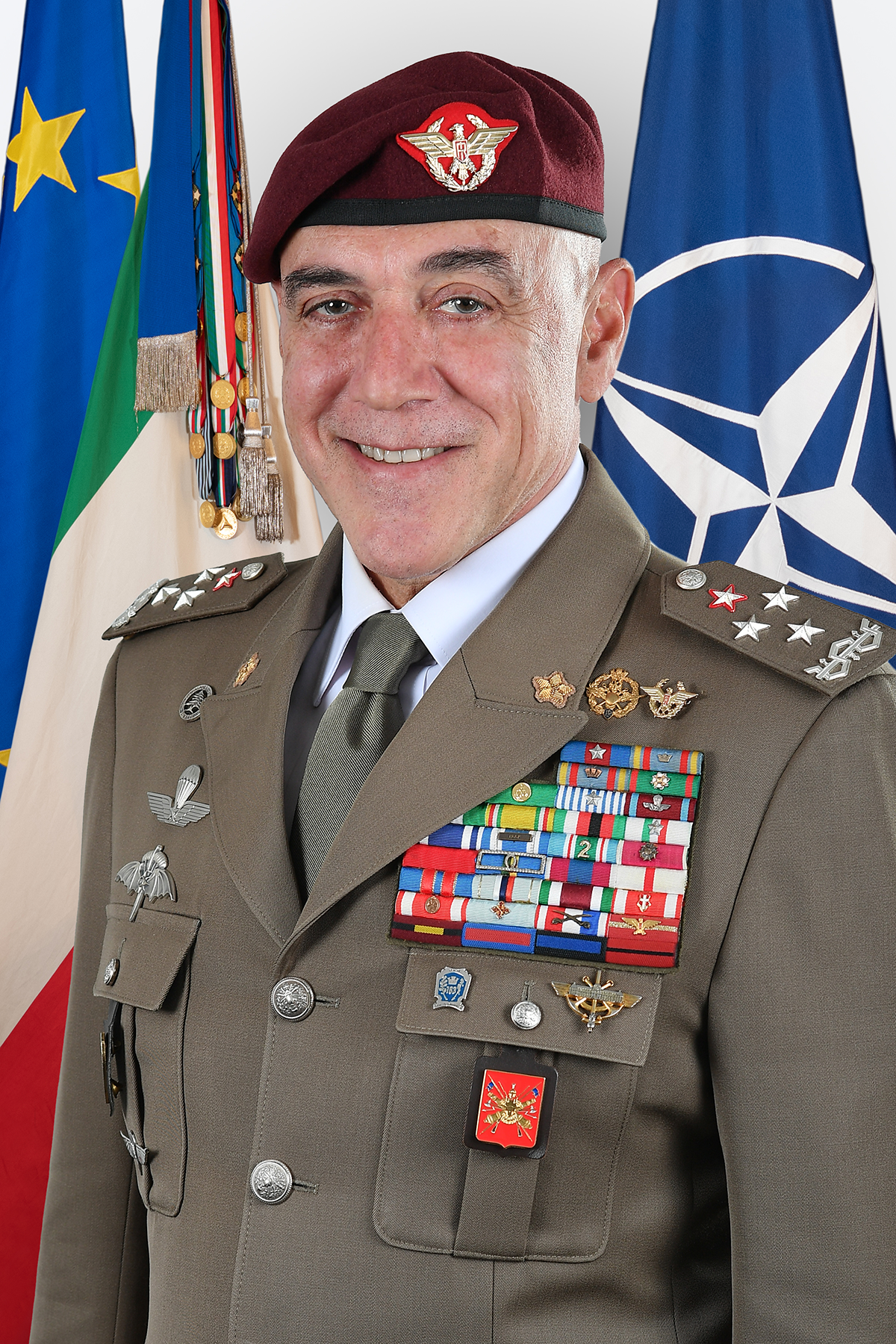
- Incumbent; Generale di Corpo d'Armata; Carmine Masiello since 27 February 2024
- Italian Army
- Abbreviation: CSME
- Member of: Army Staff
- Reports to: Chief of the Defence Staff
- Formation: 1 September 1882
- First holder: Enrico Cosenz

The chief of staff of the Italian Army refers to the chiefs of staff of the Royal Italian Army from 1882 to 1946 and the Italian Army from 1946 to the present.

== List of chiefs of staff ==
=== Royal Italian Army (1882–1946) ===
No.	Portrait	Chiefs of Staff of the Royal Italian Army	Took office	Left office	Time in office
1	Enrico Cosenz	Lieutenant General; Enrico Cosenz (1820–1898)	1 September 1882	1 December 1893	11 years, 91 days
2	Domenico Primerano [it]	Lieutenant General; Domenico Primerano (1829–1911)	1 December 1893	1 June 1896	2 years, 183 days
3	Tancredi Saletta	Lieutenant General; Tancredi Saletta (1840–1909)	1 June 1896	27 June 1908	12 years, 23 days
4	Alberto Pollio	Lieutenant General; Alberto Pollio (1852–1914)	1 July 1908	1 July 1914 †	6 years
5	Luigi Cadorna	Lieutenant General; Luigi Cadorna (1850–1928) (Note: Dismissed after the disaster at Caporetto.)	10 July 1914	9 November 1917	3 years, 122 days
6	Armando Diaz	Lieutenant General; Armando Diaz (1861–1928)	9 November 1917	24 November 1919	2 years, 15 days
7	Pietro Badoglio	General of the Army; Pietro Badoglio (1871–1956)	24 November 1919	3 February 1921	1 year, 71 days
8	Giuseppe Vaccari [it]	Lieutenant General; Giuseppe Vaccari (1866–1937)	3 February 1921	1 May 1923	2 years, 87 days
9	Giuseppe Francesco Ferrari [it]	Lieutenant General; Giuseppe Francesco Ferrari (1865–1943)	1 May 1923	4 May 1925	2 years, 3 days
(7)	Pietro Badoglio	General of the Army; Pietro Badoglio (1871–1956)	4 May 1925	1 February 1927	1 year, 273 days
(9)	Giuseppe Francesco Ferrari [it]	Lieutenant General; Giuseppe Francesco Ferrari (1865–1943)	1 February 1927	25 February 1928	1 year, 14 days
10	Nicola Gualtieri [it]	Generale di Corpo d'Armata; Nicola Gualtieri (1866–1953)	29 July 1928	4 February 1929	190 days
11	Alberto Bonzani [it]	Generale di Corpo d'Armata; Alberto Bonzani (1872–1935)	4 February 1929	1 October 1934	5 years, 239 days
12	Federico Baistrocchi	Generale Designato d'Armata; Federico Baistrocchi (1871–1947)	1 October 1934	7 October 1936	2 years, 6 days
13	Alberto Pariani	Generale Designato d'Armata; Alberto Pariani (1876–1955)	7 October 1936	3 November 1939	3 years, 27 days
14	Rodolfo Graziani	Marshal of Italy; Rodolfo Graziani (1882–1955)	3 November 1939	24 March 1941	1 year, 141 days
15	Mario Roatta	Generale di Corpo d'Armata; Mario Roatta (1887–1968)	24 March 1941	20 January 1942	302 days
16	Vittorio Ambrosio	Generale Designato d'Armata; Vittorio Ambrosio (1879–1958)	20 January 1942	1 February 1943	1 year, 12 days
17	Ezio Rosi	Generale Designato d'Armata; Ezio Rosi (1881–1963)	2 February 1943	18 May 1943	105 days
–	Giuseppe De Stefanis	Generale di Corpo d'Armata; Giuseppe De Stefanis (1885–1965); Acting	19 May 1943	31 May 1943	12 days
(15)	Mario Roatta	Generale di Corpo d'Armata; Mario Roatta (1887–1968)	1 June 1943	18 November 1943	170 days
18	Paolo Berardi	Generale di Corpo d'Armata; Paolo Berardi (1885–1953)	18 November 1943	10 February 1945	1 year, 84 days
19	Ercole Ronco [it]	Generale di Brigata; Ercole Ronco (1890–1967)	10 February 1945	4 July 1945	144 days
20	Raffaele Cadorna Jr.	Generale di Divisione; Raffaele Cadorna Jr. (1889–1973)	4 July 1945	13 June 1946	344 days

=== Italian Army (1946–present) ===
No.	Name	Portrait	Birth–Death	Rank	Took office	Left office	Note
1	Raffaele Cadorna Jr.		1889–1973	Divisional General	1946	1947	
2	Luigi Efisio Marras		1888–1991	Generale di Corpo d'Armata	1947	1950	
3	Ernesto Cappa		1888–1957	Generale di Corpo d'Armata	1950	1952	
4	Giuseppe Pizzorno			Generale di Corpo d'Armata	1952	1954	
5	Giorgio Liuzzi		1895–1983	Generale di Corpo d'Armata	1954	1959	
6	Bruno Lucini			Generale di Corpo d'Armata	1959	1960	
7	Antonio Gualano		1899–1983	Generale di Corpo d'Armata	1960	1962	
8	Giuseppe Aloia		1905–1980	Generale di Corpo d'Armata	1962	1966	
9	Giovanni de Lorenzo		1907–1973	Generale di Corpo d'Armata	1966	1967	
10	Guido Vedovato			Generale di Corpo d'Armata	1966	1968	
11	Enzo Marchesi		1907–1996	Generale di Corpo d'Armata	1968	1970	
12	Francesco Mereu			Generale di Corpo d'Armata	1970	1973	
13	Andrea Viglione		1914–1992	Generale di Corpo d'Armata	1973	1975	
14	Andrea Cucino			Generale di Corpo d'Armata	1975	1977	
15	Eugenio Rambaldi			Generale di Corpo d'Armata	1977	1981	
16	Umberto Cappuzzo		1922–2014	Generale di Corpo d'Armata	1981	1985	
17	Luigi Poli			Generale di Corpo d'Armata	1985	1987	
18	Ciro Di Martino			Generale di Corpo d'Armata	1987	1989	
19	Domenico Corcione		1929–2020	Generale di Corpo d'Armata	1989	1990	Later served as the Minister of Defence from 1995 to 1996
20	Goffredo Canino		1931–2008	Generale di Corpo d'Armata	1990	1993	
21	Bonifazio Incisa di Camerana		1934–2013	Generale di Corpo d'Armata	1993	1997	
22	Francesco Cervoni			Lt. General	1997	2001	
23	Gianfranco Ottogalli			Lieutenant General	2001	2003	
24	Giulio Fraticelli			Lieutenant General	2003	2005	
25	Filiberto Cecchi		1944–	Generale di Corpo d'Armata	2005	2007	
26	Fabrizio Castagnetti		1945–	Generale di Corpo d'Armata	2007	2009	
27	Giuseppe Valotto		1946–	Generale di Corpo d'Armata	2009	2011	
28	Claudio Graziano		1953–2024	Generale di Corpo d'Armata	2011	2015	
29	Danilo Errico		1953–	Generale di Corpo d'Armata	2015	27 February 2018	
30	Salvatore Farina		1957–	Generale di Corpo d'Armata	27 February 2018	26 February 2021	
31	Pietro Serino		1960–	Generale di Corpo d'Armata	26 February 2021	27 February 2024	
32	Carmine Masiello		1963-	Generale di Corpo d'Armata	27 February 2024	Incumbent	

== See also ==
- Italian Armed Forces
  - Chief of the Defence Staff (Italy)
- Royal Italian Army
- Italian Army
