= AFCENT =

AFCENT may refer to:

- Allied Forces Central Europe (AFCENT), a former name of Allied Joint Force Command Brunssum, a NATO military command
- United States Air Forces Central (USAFCENT or informally just AFCENT), formerly named United States Central Command Air Forces
