= Liuzzi =

Liuzzi may refer to:

- Liuzzi-class submarine, Italian naval class in World War II
  - Italian submarine Console Generale Liuzzi, a submarine in that class

== People ==
- Bruno Liuzzi (born 2000), Argentine-Chilean footballer
- Emanuela Liuzzi (born 2000), Italian wrestler
- Emanuele Liuzzi (born 1990), Italian rower
- Giorgio Liuzzi (1895–1983), Italian soldier
- Michele Liuzzi (born 1975), Italian wrestler
- Mondino de Liuzzi (c. 1270 – 1326), Italian physician, the restorer of the field of anatomy
- Vitantonio Liuzzi (born 1980), Italian auto racer

== See also ==
- Liuzza (disambiguation)
