= Joint Warfare Centre =

NATO military command unit

Coordinates: 58°54′27″N 5°43′18″E

- Coat of arms
- Founded: 23 October 2003; 22 years ago
- Type: Military education and training
- Role: Collective security
- Part of: Allied Command Transformation
- Headquarters: Jåttånuten, Stavanger, Norway
- Motto: Training NATO. Advancing Doctrine. Integrating Concepts
- Website: www.jwc.nato.int

Commanders
- Current commander: Major General Jens ArltGerman Army
- Ceremonial chief: Rear Admiral Jeanette Morang Royal Netherlands Navy

The Joint Warfare Centre (JWC) is a NATO establishment headquartered in Stavanger, Norway.

It was established at Jåttå on 23 October 2003 as a subordinate command of Headquarters Supreme Allied Commander Transformation (HQ SACT). The purpose of this was to have a command with responsibility for training and exercise of the NATO headquarters. The old Joint Headquarters North (JHQ NORTH) was abolished and command transferred to the Allied Command Transformation (ACT) in Norfolk, Virginia, US.

== Mission ==
Locations of NATO's two strategic commands — Allied Command Transformation (ACT) with its subordinate centres (blue marks) and Allied Command Operations (ACO), headquartered at Supreme Headquarters Allied Powers Europe (SHAPE) and including its subordinate and joint force commands (red marks).

The JWC provides NATO's training focal point for full spectrum joint operational level warfare.

The mission of the Joint Warfare Centre is to:

- Provide operational level joint training in support of ongoing operations;
- Conduct and supports collective training of joint and combined staffs of the NATO Command Structure (NCS) and NATO Force Structure (NFS) for Major Joint Operations (MJOs) and Small Joint Operations (SJOs), integrating NATO members' national capacities, regional security organizations' initiatives and Partnership for Peace (PfP);
- Provide key leader training capability;
- Support adherence to joint operational warfare doctrine and standards;
- Assist the developmental and experimental work of Allied Command Transformation on new concepts, technologies, modeling and simulation;
- Performs joint analysis, collects lessons learned and feeds them back into the transformational network through the Joint Analysis and Lessons Learned Centre.

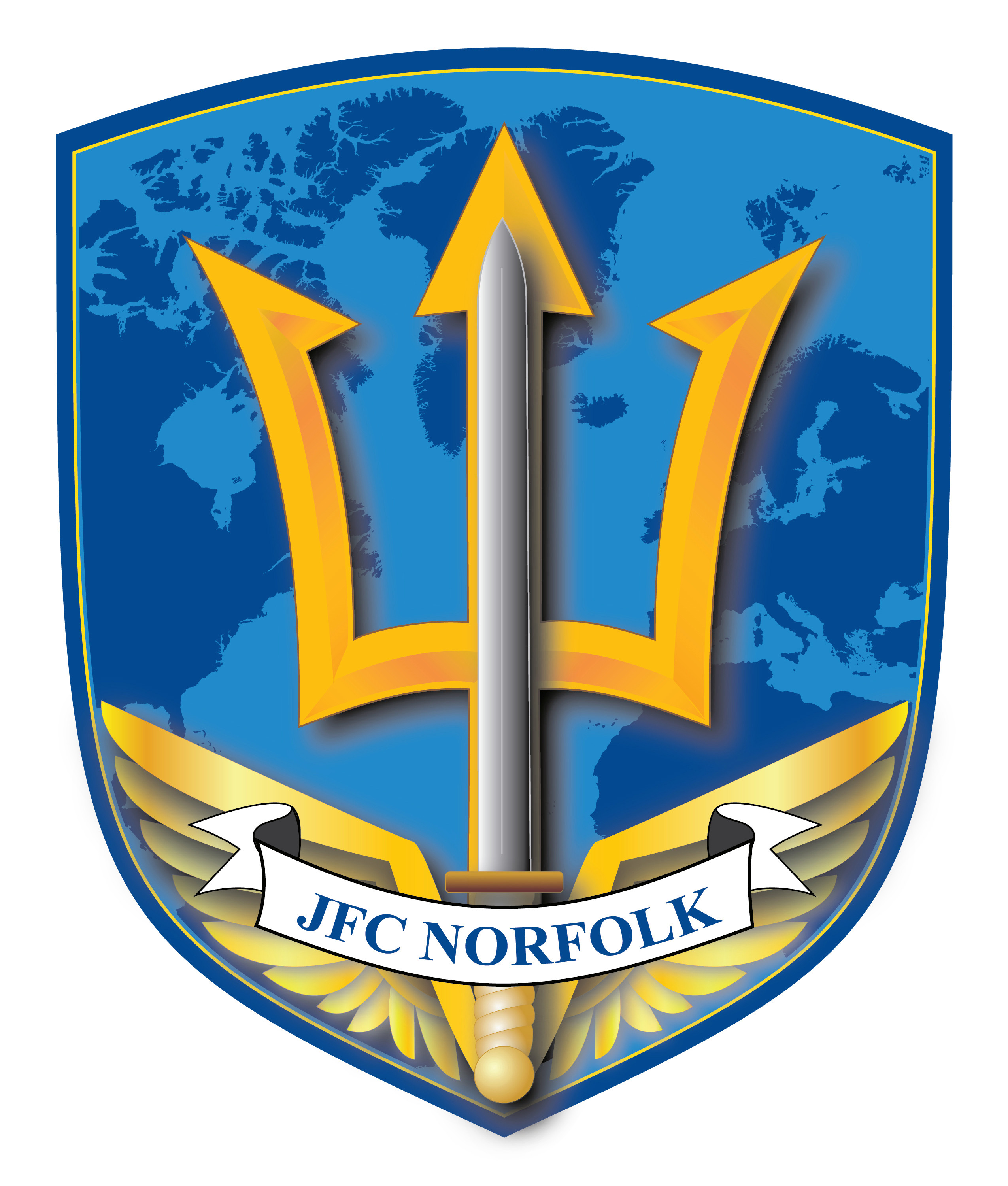
POLITICAL-STRATEGIC LEVEL: | North Atlantic Council (NAC); NATO Headquarters, Brussels, BEL
Secretary-General (SECGEN); NATO Headquarters, Brussels, BEL | International Staff (IS); NATO Headquarters, Brussels, BEL
MILITARY-STRATEGIC LEVEL:
International Military Staff (IMS); NATO Headquarters, Brussels, BEL | Military Committee (MC); NATO Headquarters, Brussels, BEL
STRATEGIC COMMANDS:
Supreme Allied Commander Transformation; Allied Command Transformation (ACT); Norfolk, U.S. | Supreme Allied Commander Europe; Allied Command Operations (ACO); Mons, BEL
TRANSFORMATION COMMANDS: | OPERATIONAL COMMANDS:
Joint Warfare Centre (JWC); Stavanger, NOR | Joint Force Command Brunssum (JFC Brunssum); Brunssum, NLD | Allied Air Command (AIRCOM); Ramstein, DEU
Joint Force Training Centre (JFTC); Bydgoszcz, POL | Joint Force Command Naples (JFC Naples); Naples, ITA | Allied Land Command (LANDCOM); İzmir, TUR
Joint Analysis and Lessons Learned Centre (JALLC); Lisbon, PRT | Joint Force Command Norfolk (JFC Norfolk); Norfolk, Virginia, U.S. | Allied Maritime Command (MARCOM); Northwood, GBR
Joint Support and Enabling Command (JSEC); Ulm, DEU

== Commanders and Directors ==
The Commanders and Directors of the Joint Warfare Centre:

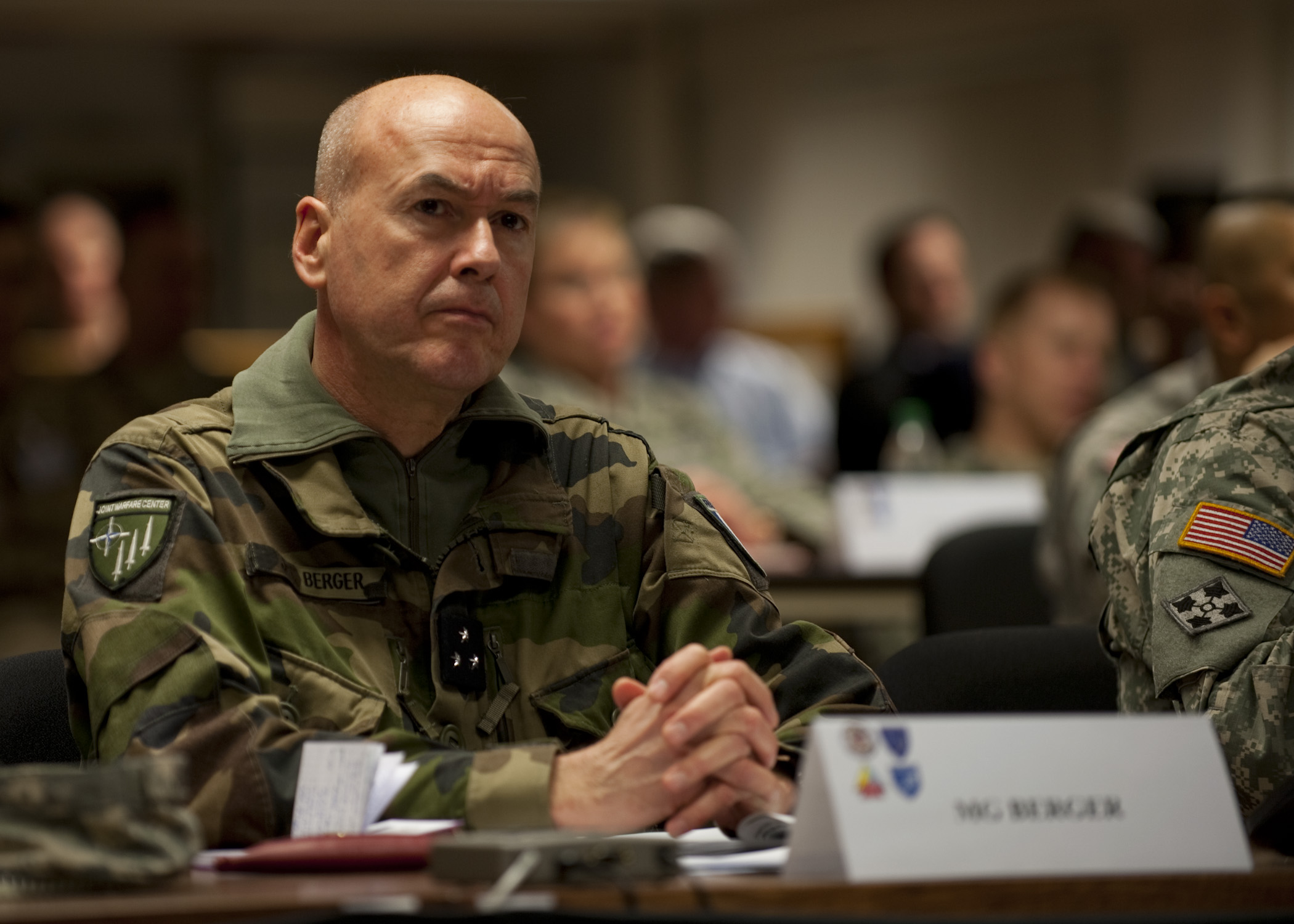
Général de division Jean-Fred Berger, Commander JWC June 2011 to June 2013

| Nr. | Name | Country | Commencement of post | End of post |
|---|---|---|---|---|
| 12 | Generalmajor Jens Arlt | Germany | Oktober 2026 | |
| 11 | Generalmajor Ruprecht von Butler | Germany | September 2024 | October 2026 |
| 10 | Generał dywizji Piotr Malinowski | Poland | October 2021 | September 2024 |
| 9 | Konteradmiral Jan C. Kaack | Germany | July 2019 | October 2021 |
| 8 | Generał dywizji Andrzej Reudowicz | Poland | July 2016 | July 2019 |
| 7 | Generalmajor Reinhard Wolski | Germany | September 2014 | July 2016 |
| 6 | Generalleutnant Erhard Bühler | Germany | June 2013 | September 2014 |
| 5 | Général de division Jean-Fred Berger | France | June 2011 | June 2013 |
| 4 | Generalleutnant Wolfgang Korte | Germany | July 2007 | June 2011 |
| 3 | Air Marshal Peter Walker | United Kingdom | February 2005 | July 2007 |
| 2 | Major-General James Short | United Kingdom | September 2004 | February 2005 |
| 1 | Generalløytnant Thorstein Skiaker | Norway | October 2003 | September 2004 |
