= Hans-Lothar Domröse =

Senior German Army officer

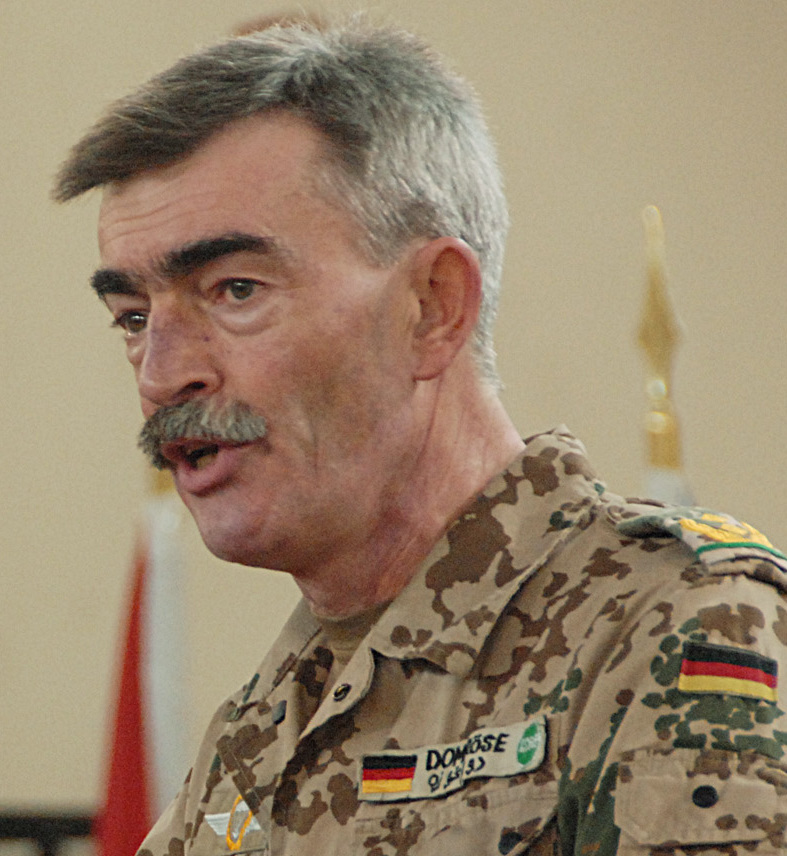
- Hans-Lothar Domröse in 2009, as outgoing Chief of Staff for International Security Assistance Force (ISAF) Headquarters
- Born: 28 December 1952 (age 73); Hanover, West Germany
- Military career
- Allegiance: West Germany (1973–1990); Germany (1990–present)
- Branch: German Army
- Service years: 1973–present
- Rank: General
- Commands: Allied Joint Force Command Brunssum; Eurocorps; Panzergrenadierbrigade 41
- Conflicts: Stabilisation Force; War in Afghanistan (2001–2021)
- Awards: See text

General Hans-Lothar Domröse (born 28 December 1952) is a senior German Army officer, former Commander of Allied Joint Force Command Brunssum.

== Army career ==
Domröse joined the German Bundeswehr in 1973, serving as a second lieutenant in the Panzergrenadierbataillon 23 (Mechanised Infantry Battalion 23). He studied Economic and Organisational Sciences at the University of the Bundeswehr Hamburg, and upon his graduation in 1977 joined the Mechanised Infantry Battalion 82, serving as a platoon commander.

In 1979 Domröse was appointed as an intelligence officer, and in 1980 became commander of the 2nd Company, Mechanised Infantry Battalion 82.

Between 1984 and 1986, he attended the Command and General Staff Officer Course at the Bundeswehr Command and Staff College in Hamburg. When he graduated Domröse became the assistant chief of staff at the Headquarters of the 11th Armoured Division.

In 1988 he was appointed assistant chief of staff at the headquarters of the 31st Mechanised Infantry Brigade. In 1989 Domröse was made personal assistant to the Head of Division II (foreign and security policy) in the Federal Chancellery in Bonn.

Domröse was appointed commander of Airborne Infantry Battalion 313 between 1991 and 1993. He then served in Bonn as a desk officer in the Policy Planning staff of the Federal Ministry of Defence.

He was a Section Chief at NATO HQ in 1995, and in 1998 was assigned as chief of staff, Military District Command VII / 13th Mechanised Infantry Division in Leipzig. In 1999, Domröse was deployed to Prizren, Kosovo as chief of staff, Multinational Brigade South of the 3rd Operational Contingent KFOR.

Between 2000 and 2003 he served as commander of the 41st Mechanised Infantry Brigade in Torgelow with the rank of colonel. Domröse was then appointed head of the German team at CENTCOM in Tampa, Florida before returning to the Federal Ministry of Defence as Deputy Chief of Armed Forces Staff.

In 2006 Domröse was assigned as commander of Special Operations Division in Regensburg. In 2008 he was deployed to Afghanistan as the Chief of Staff ISAF HQ in Kabul.

Following his preparation for his next assignment at the Army Forces Command in Koblenz, he took over the command for the Eurocorps in Strasbourg in 2009.

In 2011 Domröse was made the German Military Representative MC/NATO and EU in Brussels. He was commander of Allied Joint Force Command Brunssum by 14 December 2012 to 3 March 2016.

== Personal life ==
General Hans-Lothar Domröse is married to Christina and has two grown-up sons.

== Awards and decorations ==
Domröses's awards and decorations include the following:

- Bundeswehr Cross of Honour in Bronze
- Bundeswehr Cross of Honour in Gold
- Operation SFOR Bronze Deployment Medal
- Operation KFOR Bronze Deployment Medal
- Operation ISAF Silver Deployment Medal
- Operation "Flood Relief" Medal
- NATO Medal "Former Yugoslavia"
- NATO Medal "Kosovo"
- NATO Medal "ISAF"
- NATO Meritorious Service Medal
- National Defence Medal (France)
- Commander of the Legion of Honour (France)
- Emblem of Honour of the Romanian General Staff
- Polish Army Medal in Silver and Gold
- Commander of the Order of the Oak Crown (Luxembourg)

Military offices
Preceded by Wolf-Dieter Langheld	Commander, Allied Joint Force Command Brunssum; 2012–2016	Succeeded by General Salvatore Farina
Preceded by Lieutenant General Pedro Pitarch	Commanding General, Eurocorps; 25 September 2009 – 1 July 2011	Succeeded by Lieutenant General Olivier de Bavinchove
Preceded by Generalmajor Rainer Glatz	Commander of Rapid Forces Division; 9 March 2006 – 10 January 2008	Succeeded by Generalmajor Hans-Werner Fritz
