= Italian destroyer Agostino Bertani =

Italian La Masa-class destroyer

History

Kingdom of Italy
- Name: Agostino Bertani
- Namesake: Agostino Bertani (1812–1886), Italian patriot and politician
- Builder: Cantieri navali Odero, Sestri Ponente, Kingdom of Italy
- Laid down: 23 December 1917
- Launched: 6 June 1919
- Completed: 13 June 1919
- Commissioned: 13 June 1919
- Renamed: Enrico Cosenz January 1921
- Stricken: January 1921
- Reinstated: January 1921
- Identification: Pennant number BR
- Namesake: Enrico Cosenz (1820–1898), Italian general and politician
- Reclassified: Torpedo boat 1929
- Identification: Pennant number CS
- Fate: Scuttled 27 September 1943

General characteristics (as built)
- Type: Destroyer
- Displacement: 785 long tons (798 t) (standard); 851 long tons (865 t) (full load)
- Length: 72.5 m (237 ft 10 in) (waterline)
- Beam: 7.3 m (23 ft 11 in)
- Draught: 2.8 m (9 ft 2 in)
- Installed power: 15,500 shp (11,558 kW); maximum 17,000 shp (12,677 kW)
- Propulsion: 2 × Tosi steam turbines; 4 × Thornycroft boilers
- Speed: 33.6 knots (62.2 km/h; 38.7 mph)
- Range: 2,230 nmi (4,130 km; 2,570 mi) at 12.5 knots (23.2 km/h; 14.4 mph); 410 nmi (759 km; 472 mi) at 28.5 knots (52.8 km/h; 32.8 mph)
- Complement: 4 officers, 74 non-commissioned officers and sailors
- Armament: As built: 4 × 102 mm (4 in)/45 guns; 2 × 76.2 mm (3 in)/40 AA; 4 × 450 mm (18 in) torpedo tubes; 10 mines

Agostino Bertani was an Italian La Masa-class destroyer. She was commissioned into service in the Italian Regia Marina (Royal Navy) in 1919. Her crew supported Gabriele D'Annunzio′s actions in Fiume in 1920, and as a consequence she was renamed Enrico Cosenz in 1921. Reclassified as a torpedo boat in 1929, she took part in the Mediterranean campaign and the Adriatic campaign of World War II until the Italian armistice with the Allies in 1943, shortly after which her crew scuttled her to prevent her capture by German forces. She was involved in four collisions during her operational career.

== Construction and commissioning ==
Agostino Bertani was laid down at the Cantieri navali Odero (English: Odero Shipyard) in Sestri Ponente, Italy, on 23 December 1917. She was launched on 6 June 1919 and completed and commissioned on 13 June 1919.

== Service history ==
=== 1921–1940 ===
Before Italy entered World War I in May 1915, it had made a pact with the Allies, the Treaty of London of 1915, in which it was promised all of the Austrian Littoral, but not the city of Fiume (known in Croatian as Rijeka). By late October 1918, Austria-Hungary had effectively disintegrated, and the Armistice of Villa Giusti, signed on 3 November 1918, went into effect on 4 November 1918 and brought hostilities between Austria-Hungary and the Allies to an end. World War I ended a week later with the armistice between the Allies and the German Empire on 11 November 1918. At the Paris Peace Conference in 1919, this delineation of territory under the Treaty of London was confirmed, with Fiume remaining outside of Italy's borders and amalgamated into the Kingdom of the Serbs, Croats and Slovenes (which in 1929 would be renamed the Kingdom of Yugoslavia). Opposing this outcome, the poet and Italian nationalist Gabriele D'Annunzio led a force of about 2,600 so-called "legionaries" to Fiume and seized the city in September 1919 in what became known as the Impresa di Fiume ("Fiume endeavor" or "Fiume enterprise"). On the night of 7–8 October 1919, Agostino Bertani was moored at the Molo Sanità (Sanità Pier) in Trieste when, following disturbances aboard the ship, officers who sided with D'Annunzio seized control of the ship and took her to Fiume.

D'Annunzio declared Fiume to be the Italian Regency of Carnaro in September 1920. Relations between Italy and D'Annunzio's government continued to deteriorate, and after Italy signed the Treaty of Rapallo with the Kingdom of the Serbs, Croats, and Slovenes in November 1920, making Fiume an independent state as the Free State of Fiume rather than incorporating it into Italy, D'Annunzio declared war on Italy. Italy launched a full-scale invasion of Fiume on 24 December 1920, beginning what became known as the Bloody Christmas. The Bloody Christmas fighting ended on 29 December 1920 in D'Annunzio's defeat and the establishment of the Free State of Fiume. With the Fiume affair at an end, Agostino Bertani surrendered to Italian forces and returned to Regia Marina control. In mid-January 1921 she moved to Pola and was stricken temporarily from the naval register. She quickly was reinstated as a ship of the Regia Marina with the new name Enrico Cosenz.

On 19 February 1926, the destroyer Fratelli Cairoli accidentally rammed Enrico Cosenz. Enrico Cosenz was reclassified as a torpedo boat in 1929.

=== World War II ===
World War II broke out in September 1939 with Nazi Germany's invasion of Poland. Fascist Italy joined the war on the side of the Axis powers with its invasion of France on 10 June 1940. At the time, Enrico Cosenz was based at Brindisi as part of the 7th Torpedo Boat Squadron, which also included the torpedo boats Angelo Bassini, Giacomo Medici, and Nicola Fabrizi. During the war, she operated on escort duty, at first along the shipping routes between Italy and North Africa and later in the Tyrrhenian Sea.

At the end of September 1940, Enrico Cosenz was escorting a steamship of around 700 gross register tons in the Eastern Mediterranean when a submarine torpedoed the steamer. After Enrico Cosenz counterattacked with depth charges, her crew reported seeing a presumably British submarine come to the surface, listing heavily, and sinking. Although the Italian Royal Army's official bulletin and the newspaper La Domenica del Corriere (The Sunday Courier) both reported that Enrico Cosenz had sunk a British submarine, British records do not confirm the loss of a submarine.

From 11 to 12 October 1940 Enrico Cosenz escorted the merchant ship Col di Lana from Tripoli, Libya, to Naples, Italy.

After 1940, Enrico Cosenz underwent a revision of her armament which saw the removal of two 102-millimetre (4 in) guns and two torpedo tubes and the replacement of her 76-millimetre (3 in) guns with six 20-millimetre autocannons. On 9 April 1941 she got underway from Naples with the destroyer Dardo and the torpedo boats Clio and Generale Achille Papa to escort the merchant ships Andrea Gritti, Barbarigo, Burmania, Rialto, and Sebastiano Venier to Tripoli. The convoy arrived at Tripoli without incident on 11 April 1941.

At 05:30 on 21 November 1941, Enrico Cosenz departed Naples with the destroyer Nicoloso da Recco to escort the modern merchant ship Monginevro and the large tanker Iridio Mantovani to Libya. During the operation, British forces attacked the convoy's distant cover force, torpedoing and seriously damaging the heavy cruiser Trieste and the light cruiser Luigi di Savoia Duca degli Abruzzi.

At 04:50 on 21 January 1942, Enrico Cosenz collided with the auxiliary tug/minesweeper G 76 America while arriving at Trapani, Sicily. Just over a month later, at around 21:00 on 22 February 1942, she accidentally rammed the steamship Luisa, loaded with coal, in the Strait of Messina. Luisa sank in about 20 minutes.

On 17 October 1942, Giuseppe Dezza left Naples at 04:10 with the destroyers Maestrale and Grecale and the torpedo boat Giuseppe Sirtori to escort the tanker Panuco to Tripoli. On 18 October the British submarine HMS Una unsuccessfully attacked Panuco north of Catania, Sicily, with torpedoes, and later the ships came under attack by Allied aircraft, prompting the convoy to divert to Taranto, Italy, where it arrived at 02:00 on 20 October.

On 8 September 1943, the Kingdom of Italy announced an armistice with the Allies and switched sides in the war, prompting Nazi Germany to begin Operation Achse, the disarmament by force of the Italian armed forces and the occupation of those portions of Italy not yet under Allied control. Enrico Cosenz avoided capture, but on 25 September 1943 suffered damage in another collision, this time with the steamer Ulisse off Lastovo (known to the Italians as Lagosta) in the Adriatic Sea off the coast of Dalmatia. On 27 September 1943, German aircraft inflicted further damage on her, and later that day her crew scuttled her in the Adriatic Sea off Lastovo to prevent her capture by German forces.
