= Erhard Bühler =

German general

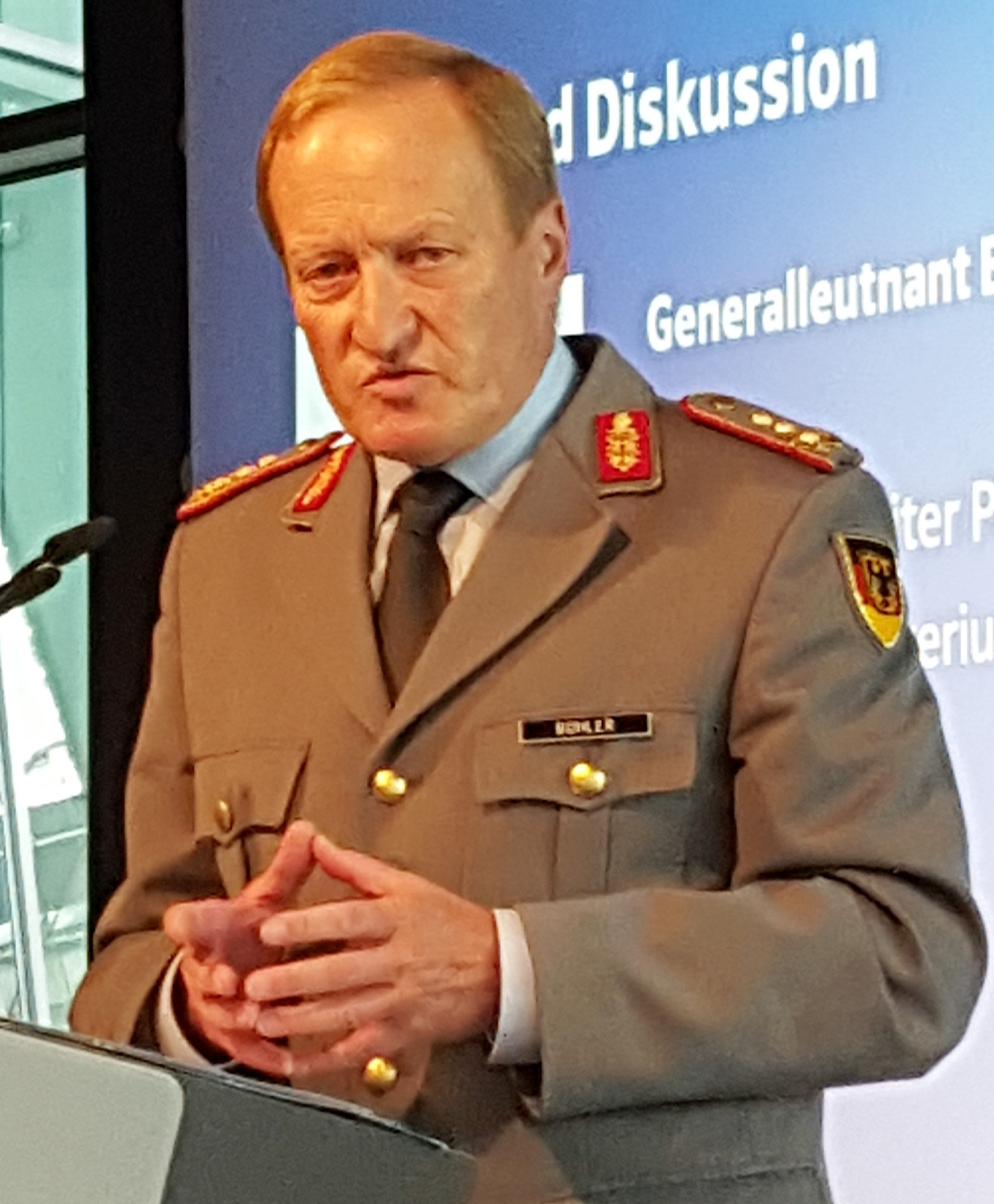
- Erhard Bühler in 2017
- Born: 20 January 1956 (age 70); Aichach, Bavaria, Germany
- Military career
- Allegiance: Germany
- Branch: Army
- Service years: 1976–2020
- Rank: General
- Commands: Federal Ministry of Defence (Germany), Kosovo Force, Commander Joint Warfare Centre

General Erhard Bühler (born 20 January 1956) is a retired officer of the German Army, and the former Director General for Planning German Ministry of Defence in Berlin, Germany. He was the commander of KFOR, from September 2010 to September 2011. He led approximately 5000 troops, although the number declined during his tenure as the security situation in Kosovo improved. In 2004, Bühler had led the Bundeswehr contingent of KFOR in Prizren. Bühler commanded Allied Joint Force Command Brunssum from 31 March 2019 to 22 April 2020.

== Personal life ==
Bühler was born in Aichach, Bavaria and grew up in Regensburg. He is married and has a son.

Military offices
Preceded by Bruno Kasdorf	Commander of 12th Panzer Brigade; 2003–2006	Succeeded by Lutz Nieman
Preceded by Markus Bentler	Commander of Kosovo Force; 2010–2011	Succeeded by Erhard Drews
Preceded by Markus Bentler	Commander of 10th Panzer Division; 2009–2013	Succeeded by Johann Langenegger
Preceded by Riccardo Marchiò	Commander of Allied Joint Force Command Brunssum; 2019–2020	Succeeded by Jörg Vollmer
