= Andrzej Reudowicz =

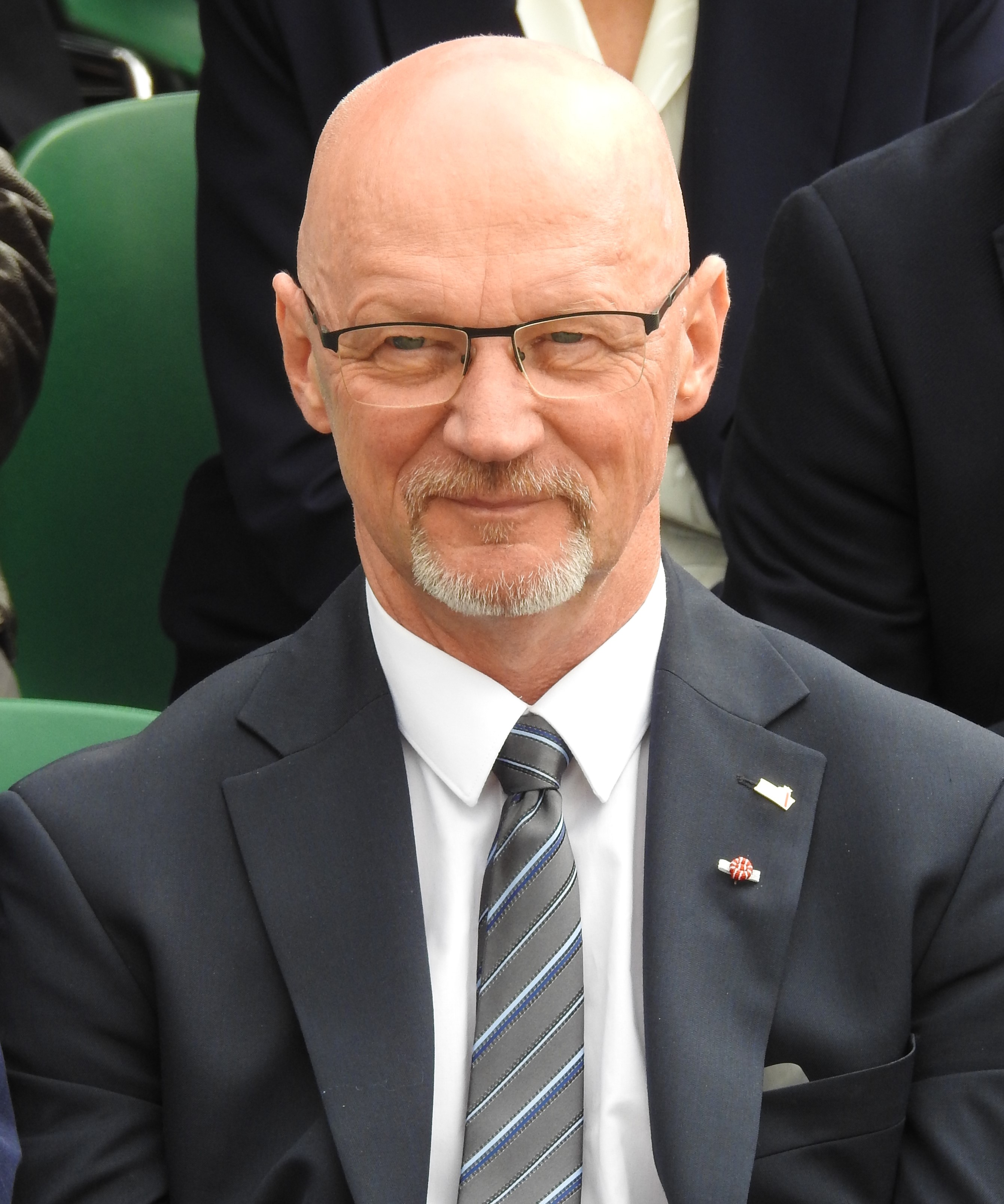
- Gen. Reudowicz in 2022
- Born: 19 November 1961 (age 64); Pisz, Polish People's Republic
- Military career
- Allegiance: Polish People's Republic; Poland
- Branch: Polish People's Army; Polish Armed Forces
- Service years: 1980-2021
- Rank: Generał dywizji (Major general)
- Units: Task Force White Eagle; Armed Forces General Command; 12th Szczecin Mechanized Division; National Security Bureau
- Commands: Commander of the 8th rotation of the Polish Forces in Afghanistan; Commander of the 12th Szczecin Mechanized Division; Commander of the NATO Joint Warfare Centre; Deputy head of the National Security Bureau
- Conflicts: Occupation of Iraq; International Security Assistance Force
- Awards

Andrzej Marek Reudowicz is a retired major general of the Polish Army, commander of the 8th rotation of the Polish Military Contingent in Afghanistan, Chancellor of the Order of the Military Cross, commander of the 12th Szczecin Mechanized Division, deputy head of the National Security Bureau.

== Biography ==
In 1984 he graduated from the Higher School of Mechanized Forces in Wrocław. He began his professional service as a platoon commander in the 41st Mechanized Regiment in Szczecin. In 1987 he became the commander of a mechanized company, in 1990 the chief of staff of a mechanized battalion. In the same year he completed the Higher Officers' Development Course. In 1994 he was a student of the National Defence University in Warsaw and then became the commander of a battalion in the 33rd Mechanized Regiment in Budow. In 1995 he became the deputy commander of the 13th Mechanized Brigade in Czarne. From 1998 in the Polish Land Forces Command as a senior officer in the operational planning department, then as a senior specialist.

In 2002–2004 he served as deputy commander of the 15th Mechanized Brigade in Giżycko. In 2005 he took up the position of assistant commander of the Multinational Division Central-South, serving in the Polish Military Contingent Iraq. In 2005–2007 he was the chief specialist and head of the Land Operations Directorate in the Land Operations Directorate. In 2008, after completing postgraduate studies at the National Defense University, he was designated as commander of the 10th Armored Cavalry Brigade in Świętoszów. On August 15, 2008, the President of the Republic of Poland, Lech Kaczyński, promoted him to the rank of Brigadier general. In 2010–2011, he commanded the 8th rotation of the Polish Military Contingent in Afghanistan. On August 9, 2011, the President of the Republic of Poland, Bronisław Komorowski, appointed him Chancellor of the Chapter of the Order of the Military Cross.

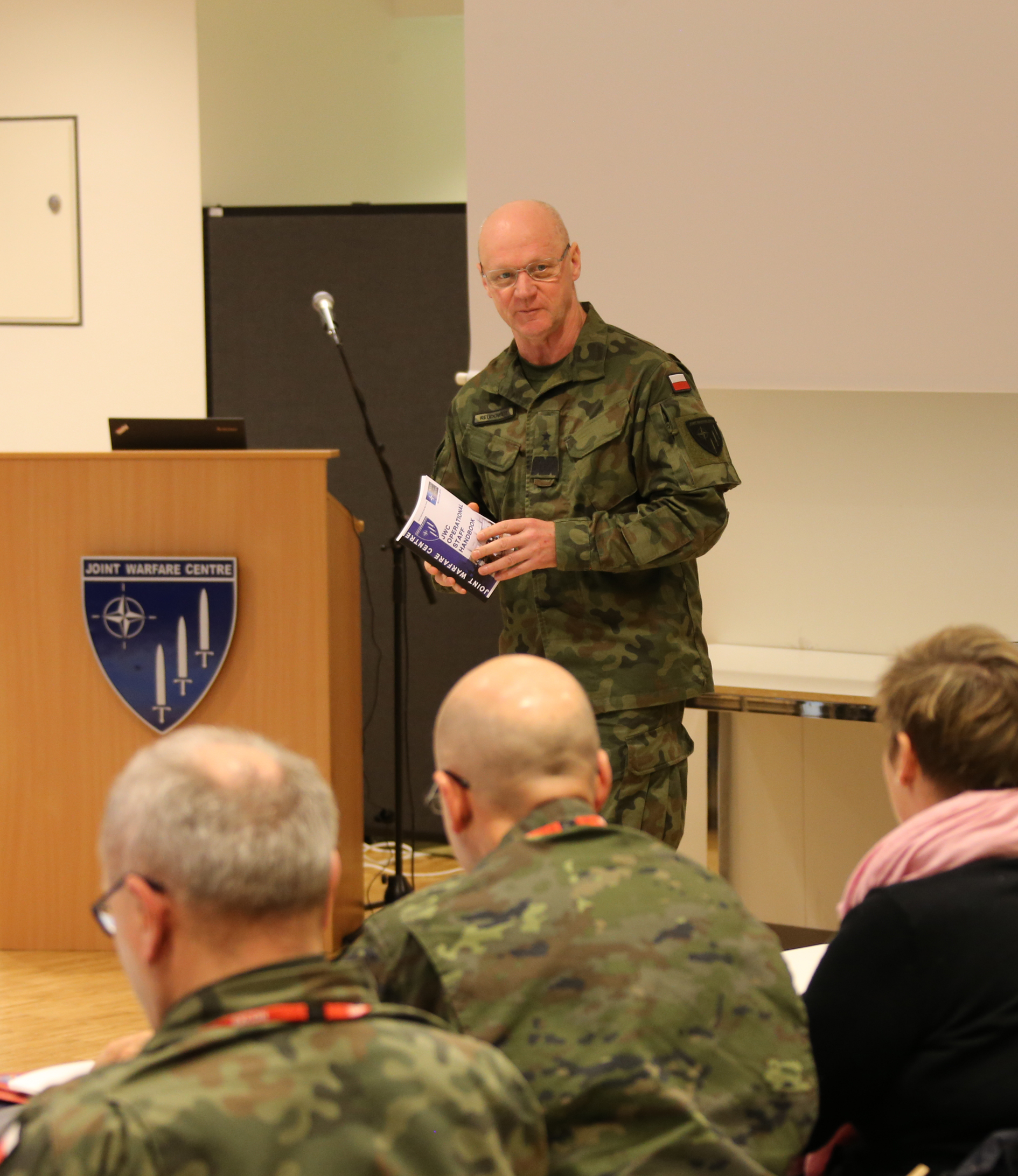
Andrzej Reudowicz in 2017

In 2013, he completed the International Capstone Course at the Center of High Defense Studies in Rome. In April 2014, he took up the position of head of the Aeromobile and Motorized Forces Directorate in the Land Forces Inspectorate of the General Staff of the Armed Forces. On November 23, 2015, he took up the position of the 12th Szczecin Mechanized Division, which he held until May 2, 2016. On August 15, 2016, President Andrzej Duda promoted him to the rank of Major General. From July 21, 2016 to July 10, 2019, he served as commander of the NATO Joint Warfare Center in Stavanger, Norway. On September 2, 2019, he took up the position of director of the Department of Armed Forces Supervision in the National Security Bureau. On October 12, 2020, he became deputy head of the National Security Bureau.

On November 19, 2021, due to reaching the age of 60, he ended his professional military service and retired. After leaving office, he became an advisor to the head of the National Security Bureau.

== Promotions ==
- Podporucznik (Second lieutenant) - 1984
- Porucznik (First lieutenant) - 1987
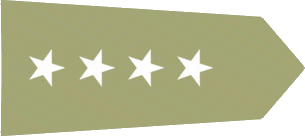
- Kapitan (Captain) - 1991
- Major (Major) - 1996
- Podpułkownik (Lieutenant colonel) - 2001
- Pułkownik (Colonel) - 2003
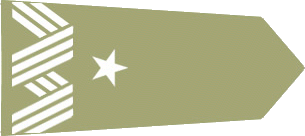
- Generał brygady (Brigadier general) - 15 August 2008
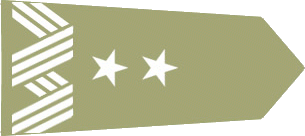
- Generał dywizji (Major general) - 15 August 2016

== Awards and decorations ==
- Commander's Cross of the Order of Polonia Restituta (2021)
- Commander's Cross of the Order of the Military Cross (2011)
- Silver Cross of Merit (2002)
- Silver Medal for Long Service
- Star of Afghanistan
- Star of Iraq
- Gold Medal of the Armed Forces in the Service of the Fatherland
- Gold Medal of Merit for National Defence (2009)
- Medal of the 100th Anniversary of the Establishment of the General Staff (2019)
- Medal "In the Service of God and Country" (2019)
- Commemorative Medal of the Multinational Division Central-South in Iraq (2005)
- NATO Medal (ISAF)
- Gold Cross of Honour of the Bundeswehr (Germany)
- Meritorious Service Medal (United States, 2011)
- Texas Outstanding Service Medal (United States)

== Bibliography ==
- Piotr Jakuboszczak: Chronicle of the Polish Army 2019. Warsaw: Military Center for Civic Education, 2020, pages 115-116; 143. ISSN 1734-2317.
- Grzegorz Jasiński: Chronicle of the Polish Army 2014. Warsaw: Military Center for Civic Education, 2015, page 122; 137. ISSN 1734-2317.
- Grzegorz Jasiński : Chronicle of the Polish Army 2011. Warsaw: Military Center for Civic Education, 2012, page 7; 89. ISSN 1734-2317.
- Resolution No. X/63/15 of the Orzysz City Council of 17 June 2015, Chairman of the City Council Adam Myka. Annex to the resolution with justification of 17 June 2015.
- Official Journal of the Republic of Poland "Monitor Polski" from 2002, 2008, 2011 and 2016.
