= Royal Italian Army =

Army of the Kingdom of Italy from 1861 to 1946

- Regio Esercito
- War flag of the Regio Esercito
- Active: 1861–1946
- Country: Kingdom of Italy
- Type: Army
- Role: Land warfare
- Size: 5,000,000 (1915); 1,600,000 (1939); 3,500,000 (1943)
- Colors: Green, white, red, blue, black, and yellow
- Anniversaries: 4 November
- Engagements: Third Italian War of Independence; Post-unification Italian brigandage; Mahdist War; First Italo-Ethiopian War; Boxer Rebellion; Italy-Somali War; Italo-Turkish War; World War I; Pacification of Libya; Second Italo-Ethiopian War; Spanish Civil War; Italian invasion of Albania; World War II

Commanders
- King of Italy: Victor Emmanuel II; Umberto I; Victor Emmanuel III; Umberto II
- Chief of the General Staff: Benito Mussolini; Pietro Badoglio; Ugo Cavallero; Vittorio Ambrosio; Giovanni Messe
- Army Chief of Staff: Enrico Cosenz; Alberto Pollio; Luigi Cadorna; Armando Diaz; Pietro Badoglio; Alberto Pariani; Raffaele Cadorna Jr.
- Notable field commanders: Rodolfo Graziani; Giovanni Messe; Italo Gariboldi; Mario Roatta; Annibale Bergonzoli

The Royal Italian Army (Italian: Regio Esercito, lit. 'Royal Army', abbreviated RE) was the land warfare branch of the armed forces of the Kingdom of Italy from 1861 until 1946. It was established following the proclamation of the Kingdom of Italy during the unification of Italy, largely incorporating the military forces of the Kingdom of Sardinia and annexed Italian states. Following the abolition of the monarchy after the 1946 Italian institutional referendum, the army was reorganized as the modern Italian Army (Esercito Italiano).

The Royal Italian Army played a major role in the political, colonial, and military history of modern Italy. Throughout its existence, it participated in the final campaigns of Italian unification, colonial conflicts in Africa and the Middle East, both world wars, and numerous overseas expeditions. The army was also home to several elite formations, including the Alpini, Bersaglieri, and Folgore units, many of which continue to exist within the modern Italian Armed Forces.

== History ==
=== Formation and unification ===
The Royal Italian Army was established in 1861 following the unification of several Italian states under the House of Savoy. The new army was primarily formed from the military forces of the Kingdom of Sardinia, though units and personnel from annexed states, including the Army of the Two Sicilies, were gradually incorporated into the national military structure.

One of the army's earliest responsibilities was suppressing resistance in southern Italy during the period known as Post-unification Italian brigandage. Royal Italian Army forces fought against Bourbon loyalists, separatists, criminal bands, and rural insurgents across southern Italy in a prolonged and violent conflict that lasted throughout much of the 1860s. The army also participated in the final campaigns of Italian unification, including the Third Italian War of Independence in 1866 and the Capture of Rome in 1870, which completed the incorporation of most of the Italian peninsula into the Kingdom of Italy.

=== Colonial expansion ===
During the late 19th century, the Royal Italian Army became increasingly involved in Italy's colonial expansion in Africa. Italian troops participated in campaigns in Eritrea, Somalia, and Libya, as well as military operations during the Mahdist War in Sudan.

The army fought in the First Italo-Ethiopian War of 1895–1896, which ended in the decisive Italian defeat at the Battle of Adwa. The battle became one of the most significant anti-colonial victories of the era and represented one of the first major defeats of a European colonial army by an African state during the modern imperial period.

Italy nevertheless continued expanding its colonial influence. During the Italo-Turkish War of 1911–1912, the Royal Italian Army helped conquer Libya and the Dodecanese islands from the Ottoman Empire. The conflict also marked one of the earliest military uses of aircraft for reconnaissance and aerial bombing.

=== World War I ===
During World War I, the Royal Italian Army fought primarily against Austria-Hungary along the Italian Front. Much of the fighting occurred in mountainous terrain along the Isonzo River, the Dolomites, and the Alps, where harsh weather and difficult geography contributed to extremely high casualty rates.

Under Chief of Staff Luigi Cadorna, the army launched multiple offensives during the Battles of the Isonzo, though most resulted in limited territorial gains at heavy cost. In 1917, Italian forces suffered a major defeat at the Battle of Caporetto, forcing a large-scale retreat and creating a national crisis. Following Cadorna's removal, General Armando Diaz reorganized the army and improved defensive coordination and troop morale. Italy later contributed to the defeat of Austria-Hungary during the Battle of Vittorio Veneto in 1918.

Within the Royal Italian Army were the elite mountain infantry units known as the Alpini, founded in 1872. The Alpini are considered the oldest active mountain infantry force in the world and were originally tasked with defending Italy's alpine borders with France and Austria-Hungary. During World War I, the Alpini fought in extreme alpine conditions against the Austro-Hungarian Kaiserjäger and the German Alpenkorps, gaining a reputation for endurance and specialized mountain warfare.

=== Interwar period ===
Following World War I, the Royal Italian Army underwent significant restructuring amid economic instability and political unrest. During the rise of Benito Mussolini and the National Fascist Party, the army became increasingly tied to Fascist military expansion and nationalist ideology.

In the 1930s, the army participated in the Second Italo-Ethiopian War, which resulted in the conquest of Ethiopia and the creation of Italian East Africa. Italian forces also intervened in the Spanish Civil War in support of Francisco Franco's Nationalist forces and occupied Albania in 1939.

Although the army expanded considerably during the interwar period, modernization efforts remained inconsistent. Many units continued using outdated artillery, transport systems, rifles, and armored vehicles entering World War II, limiting operational effectiveness compared to other major European powers.

=== World War II ===
During World War II, the Royal Italian Army fought in campaigns across North Africa, the Balkans, mainland Europe, and the Eastern Front. Italian troops participated in the Italian invasion of Greece, the North African campaign, the invasion of Yugoslavia, and the Axis invasion of the Soviet Union.

Despite fielding millions of soldiers, the army faced severe logistical and industrial limitations. Many formations suffered from shortages of modern tanks, motor vehicles, aircraft support, winter equipment, and ammunition. Coordination between branches of the armed forces was often poor, and Italian industry struggled to sustain prolonged mechanized warfare.

Elite formations such as the Alpini, Bersaglieri, and Folgore nevertheless earned reputations for combat effectiveness and resilience in difficult conditions. The Alpini suffered devastating losses during the Soviet winter campaigns, particularly during the retreat following the destruction of the Italian Eighth Army in 1942–1943. The 185th Paratroopers Division Folgore also became notable for its defense during the Second Battle of El Alamein.

Italian military defeats in Greece, Libya, and the Soviet Union gradually weakened the country's strategic position. Following the Allied invasion of Sicily and the overthrow of Mussolini in 1943, the Italian government signed the Armistice of Cassibile with the Allies.

=== Collapse and dissolution ===
Following the armistice in September 1943, the Royal Italian Army rapidly disintegrated in many regions as German forces occupied much of Italy and disarmed Italian troops. Large numbers of soldiers were captured by Germany, while others escaped, joined partisan resistance groups, or aligned themselves with either the Allied-backed government in southern Italy or the German-supported Italian Social Republic in the north.

Some surviving units became part of the Italian Co-belligerent Army, which fought alongside Allied forces during the later stages of the Italian campaign. Other Italian troops continued serving under German command within the armed forces of the Italian Social Republic until the end of the war in 1945.

After the abolition of the monarchy following the 1946 Italian institutional referendum, the Royal Italian Army officially ceased to exist. It was succeeded by the republican Italian Army, which inherited many of its traditions, regimental lineages, military academies, and ceremonial customs.

== History ==
=== Origins ===
The Regio Esercito dates from the proclamation of the Kingdom of Italy, following the unification of Italy in 1861 after most of the Papal States were seized. On 4 May 1861, Manfredo Fanti signed the creation decree, by which the new army was to replace the previous Royal Sardinian Army and the Army of the Two Sicilies.

The first two tasks of the new organization were the repression of brigandage in southern Italy against irregular and hit and run forces (mixed with bands of various criminals), who refused to accept the suppression of the Kingdom of Two Sicilies, and the Third War of Italian Independence. On 20 September 1870, the IV Corps captured Rome, which had remained under Papal control up until then.

On 8 February 1885, a corps of fewer than 1,000 soldiers landed at Massaua, Eritrea, starting the creation of an Italian colonial empire. The Italian advance of the First Italo-Ethiopian War was halted at the Battle of Adwa by overwhelming Ethiopian forces. The following year, as part of the Italian collaboration with the international pacification program after the revolt against the Turkish domination in Cyprus, another corps disembarked at Candia. On 14 July 1900, another expeditionary force was constituted to suppress the Boxer Rebellion in China in defense of the European protectorates.

On 3 October 1911, Italy invaded Libya as part of the Italo-Turkish War. The war against the Ottoman Empire ended with the signing of the First Treaty of Lausanne in Ouchy, near Lausanne, Switzerland.

=== Military Justice in the Royal Italian Army ===
In the Italian Royal Army, military justice was applied on the based on the 1870 Military Penal Code regulations. This regulation structure was very similar to the 1859 version which was inspired by the Royal Sardinian Army penal code of 1840 which preceded the Albertine Statute of 1848. These regulations and factors were determined to be inadequate in the face of direct war violence. In total, 4,028 death sentences were passed in the Royal Italian Army whereas 2,967 were issued absentia where 750 were followed through and completed and 311 were not.

=== World War I ===
The Royal Italian Army's first experience with modern warfare was in World War I, from 1915–1918. The war was fought mostly on the Italian Front in Northern Italy, costing the Italian Army serious casualties, including 246.133 killed, 946.640 wounded, 569.210 captured and 70.656 missing. The Italian 35th Division served on the Macedonian Front as part of the Allied Army of the Orient. Some Italian divisions were also sent to the Western Front in France as part of the II Army Corps, under the command of Major General Alberico Albricci.

Italian soldiers also saw action in campaigns against the Ottoman Empire in Africa and the Middle East such as in the Senussi campaign, a direct consequence of the recent occupation of Libya by Italian forces following the Italo-Turkish War of 1911–1912.

Overall, the Royal Italian Army suffered 460.000 to 709.000 killed and 947.000 to 1.050.000 wounded during World War I.

=== Interwar period ===
During the Interwar period, the army was initially focused on border security in the Alps and on the Italian-Yugoslav border. It supported Benito Mussolini's Fascist regime because of its expansionist ideology and reversal of previous governments' defense cuts. In the 1930s, the army participated in the final subjugation of Libya, participated in the invasion of Ethiopia, provided troops and materials for the Corps of Volunteer Troops (Corpo Truppe Volontarie) to fight in the Spanish Civil War, and participated in the Italian invasion of Albania.

=== World War II ===
The Regio Esercito (Royal Army) was one of the largest ground forces in World War II, during which it was one of the pioneers of the use of paratroopers. Many Italian divisions were reinforced by a MVSN Gruppo di Assalto of two battalions due to the small size of the divisions.

In 1943, Italy surrendered and split into the Italian Social Republic, which fielded its own army, the Esercito Nazionale Repubblicano (National Republican Army). On the other side was the Esercito Cobelligerante del Sud (Italian Co-Belligerent Army), the army of the Italian Royalist forces, fighting on the side of the Allies in southern Italy after the Allied armistice with Italy in September 1943.

The Kingdom was ultimately replaced by the Italian Republic in the 1946 Italian institutional referendum, and the Royal Army accordingly changed its name to become the Esercito Italiano (Italian Army).

=== Timeline ===
- 1861 – The Regio Esercito dates from the proclamation of the Kingdom of Italy, following the unification of Italy in 1861 after the Papal States were seized. On 4 May 1861, Manfredo Fanti signed the creation decree, by which the new army was to replace the previous Royal Sardinian Army and the Army of the Two Sicilies. The first two tasks of the new organization were the repression of brigandage in southern Italy against irregular and hit and run forces (mixed with bands of various criminals), who refused to accept the suppression of the Kingdom of Two Sicilies, and the Third War of Italian Independence.
- 1870 – On 20 September the IV Corps capture Rome, which had remained under Papal control up until then.
- 1885 – On 8 February fewer than 1,000 soldiers landed at Massaua, Eritrea, starting the creation of an Italian colonial empire. The Italian advance was halted at the Battle of Adwa by overwhelming Ethiopian forces. The following year, as part of the Italian collaboration with the international pacification program after the revolt against the Turkish domination in Cyprus, another corps disembarked at Candia.
- 1900 – On 14 July another expeditionary force was constituted to suppress the Boxer Rebellion in China in defense of the European protectorates.
- 1911 – On 3 October Italy invaded Libya as part of the Italo-Turkish War. The war against the Ottoman Empire ended with the signing of the First Treaty of Lausanne in Ouchy, near Lausanne, Switzerland.
- 1915–1918 – The Royal Italian Army's first experience with modern warfare was in World War I. The war was fought mostly on the Italian Front in Northern Italy, costing the Italian Army serious casualties, including about 600,000 dead.
- 1918–1939 – During the Interwar period, the army participated in the final subjugation of Libya, participated in the invasion of Ethiopia, provided troops and materials for the Corps of Volunteer Troops (Corpo Truppe Volontarie) to fight in the Spanish Civil War, and participated in the Italian invasion of Albania.
- 1940 – The Italian Royal Army had 1,630,000 men divided into 73 separate divisions. Out of these 73, there are 59 infantry divisions, six Alpini divisions, three Celere divisions, three armored divisions plus numerous Frontier Guard and coastal sector. The main cause of the Italian army's suffering was due to inadequate equipment, weaponry and leadership. This deficiency ultimately led to numerous defeats in the year 1940.
- The Regio Esercito (Royal Army) was one of the largest ground forces in World War II, during which it was one of the pioneers of the use of paratroopers. Many Italian divisions were reinforced by a MVSN Gruppo di Assalto of two battalions due to the small size of the divisions.
- 1943 – Italy surrendered and split into the Italian Social Republic, which fielded its own army, the Esercito Nazionale Repubblicano (National Republican Army). On the other side was the Esercito Cobelligerante del Sud (Italian Co-Belligerent Army), the army of the Italian Royalist forces, fighting on the side of the Allies in southern Italy after the Allied armistice with Italy in September 1943.
- 1946 – The Kingdom was ultimately replaced by the Italian Republic in 1946, and the Royal Army accordingly changed its name to become the Esercito Italiano (Italian Army).

== Main campaigns ==
=== 19th century ===
- Italian War of Independence (1866)
- Mahdist War (1881–1899)
- Italo-Ethiopian War (1895–1896)

=== 20th century ===
- Boxer Rebellion (1900)
- Italo-Turkish War (1911–1912)
- World War I (1915–1918)
- Pacification of Libya (1923–1932)
- Italo-Ethiopian War (1935–1936)
- Intervention in the Spanish Civil War (1936–1939)
- Italian invasion of Albania (1939)
- World War II (1940–1945)
  - Regio Esercito (World War II)
  - Italian Co-Belligerent Army (1943–1945)
  - Esercito Nazionale Repubblicano

== See also ==
- Italian Army
- Corpo Aeronautico Militare
- List of Italian Army equipment in World War II
- Military history of Italy during World War II
- Regia Marina
- Regia Aeronautica
- Blackshirts
- Esercito Nazionale Repubblicano
