= Danilo Errico =

Italian Army officer

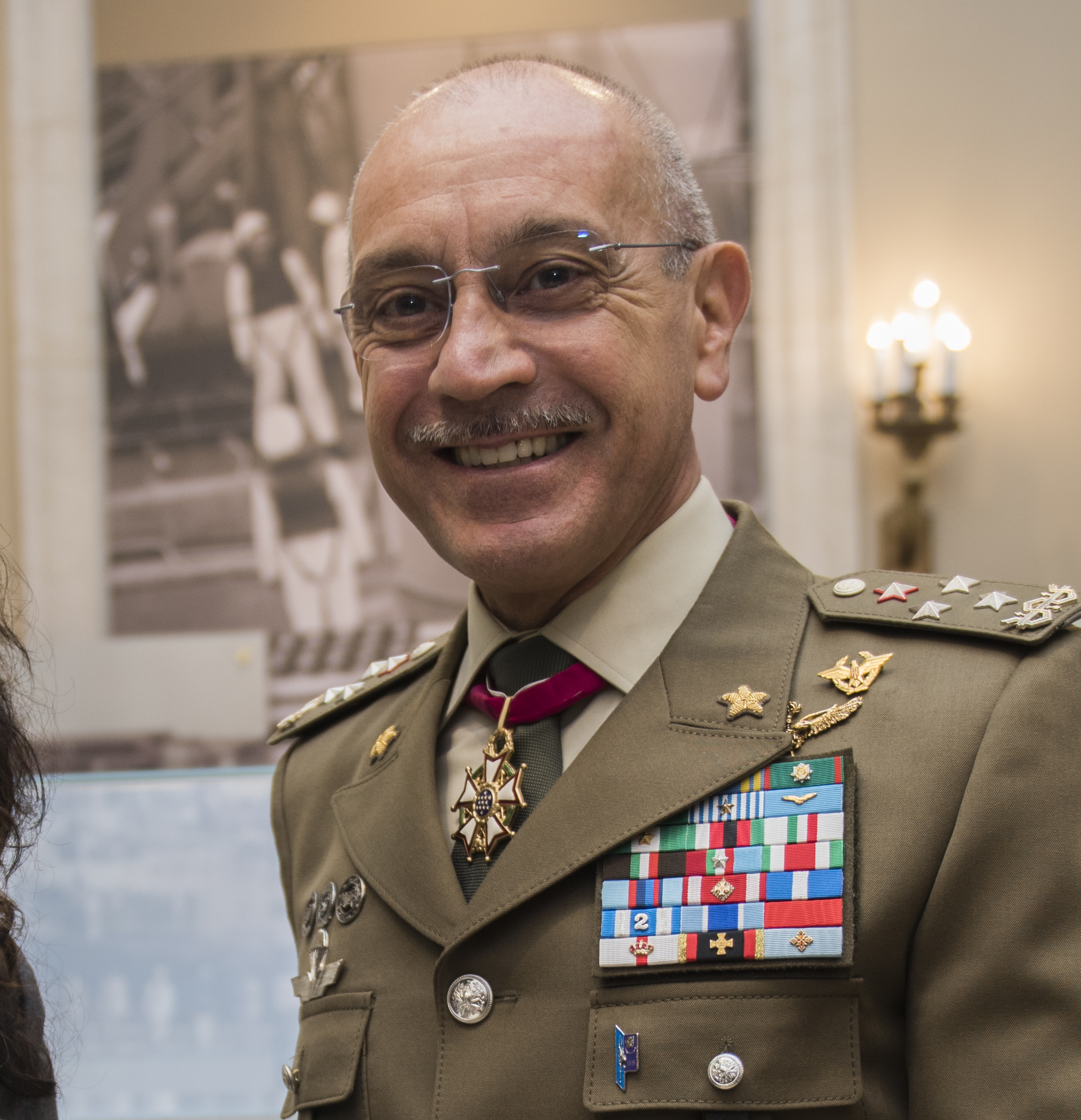
- Born: 11 August 1953 (age 73); Turin, Italy
- Military career
- Allegiance: Italy
- Branch: Italian Army
- Service years: 1973–2018
- Rank: Lieutenant General
- Commands: Chief of Staff of the Italian Army; 7th Attack Helicopter Regiment
- Awards: Knight Grand Cross of the Order of Merit of the Italian Republic; Bronze Medal of Military Valor

Lieutenant General Danilo Errico (born 11 August 1953) is an Italian Army officer, who was Chief of Staff of the Italian Army from 27 February 2015 to 27 February 2018.

He served as Deputy Chief of the Defence Staff from February 2013 to February 2015. He became Chief of the Army on 27 February 2015 and handed over command to Lieutenant General Salvatore Farina on 27 February 2018.

Military offices
Preceded by Claudio Graziano	Chief of Staff of the Italian Army; 2015–2018	Succeeded by Salvatore Farina
