= Riccardo Marchiò =

Retired Italian Army lieutenant general

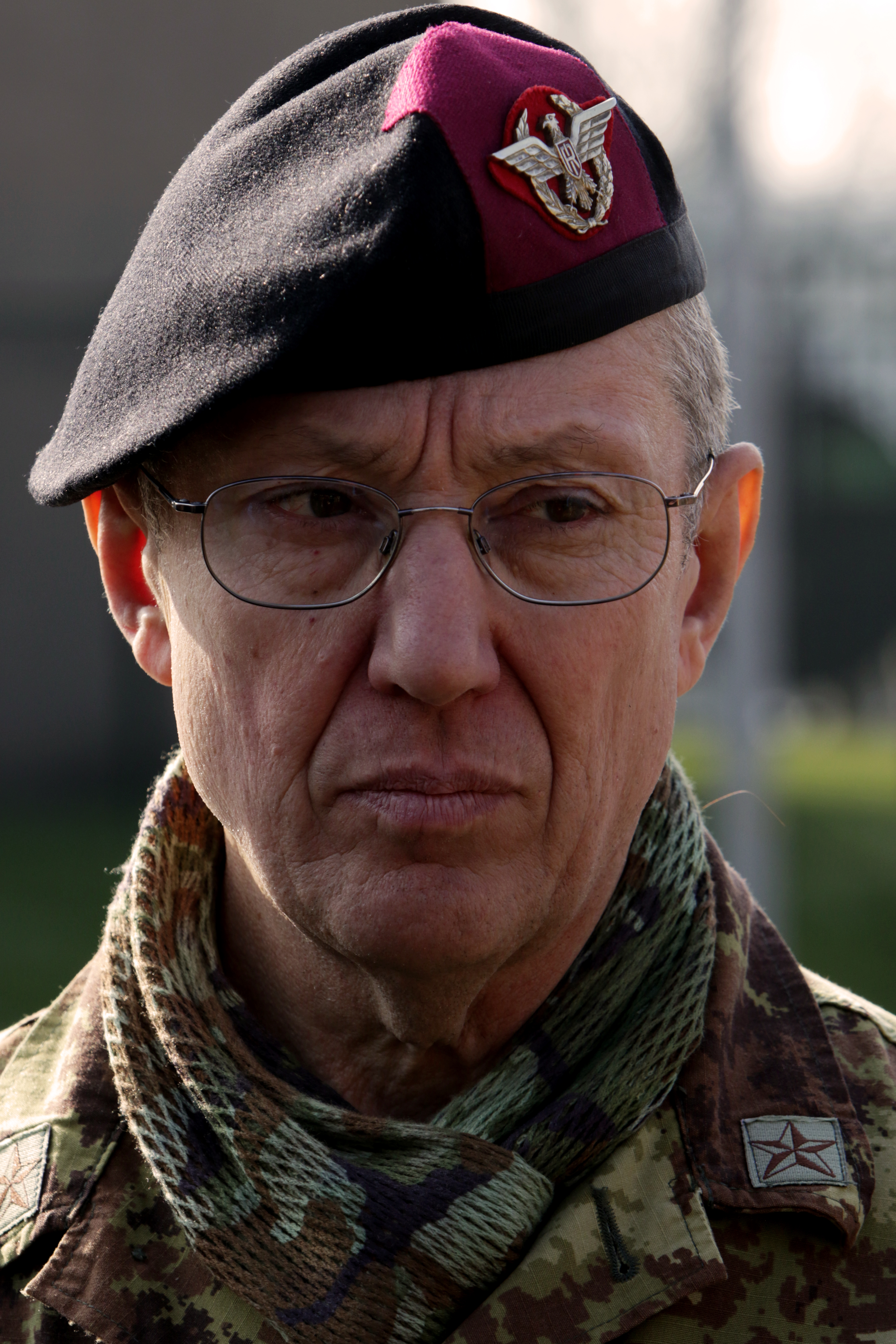
- Born: September 17, 1955 (age 70); Rome, Latium
- Allegiance: Italy
- Branch: Esercito Italiano
- Service years: 1974 – 2019
- Rank: Lieutenant General (s.t.)
- Commands: 18th Bersaglieri Regiment 'Aosta' Mechanized Brigade; NATO RDC - Italy; JFC Brunssum
- Conflicts: Yugoslav Wars; War in Afghanistan; Iraq War
- Awards: Commander, OMRI; Knight, OMI

Riccardo Marchiò (born September 17, 1955) is a retired Italian Army lieutenant general. He served as commander of NATO Rapid Deployable Corps - Italy and of Allied Joint Force Command Brunssum.

== Biography ==
He entered the Military Academy of Modena in 1974, graduating from the 156th course. After being appointed second lieutenant, he was assigned to the 6th Bersaglieri Battalion “Palestro” in Turin.

In 1982, with the rank of Captain (armed forces), he served as company commander in the ITALCON Mission in Lebanon. He was subsequently assigned to the operations division of the 3rd Army Corps in Milan.

In 1993, he took part in Unified Task Force in Mogadishu, Somalia, and the following year he was assigned to command the 2nd Bersaglieri Battalion “Governolo.” Returning to the headquarters of the 3rd Army Corps, in 1997 he was deputy Operation Alba.

With the rank of colonel, he commanded the 18th Bersaglieri Regiment and was deployed with his unit to North Macedonia for Operation Joint Guarantor and to Kosovo Force. In 1999, he left his command to attend the US Army War College (Class of 2000). In 2000, he returned to Italy and became Chief of Training at the Land Forces Command in Verona. In 2002, he was selected to command the Italian contingent in Afghanistan within the International Security Assistance Force in Kabul. In October 2003, he assumed the position of deputy commander of the “Aosta” Mechanized Brigade and from March to July 2004 he was deployed to Iraq as deputy commander of the Multinational Division Southeast (MNDSE) in Basra.

From October 2004 to September 2005, he commanded the Mechanized Brigade "Aosta". Between 2005 and 2008, he held various positions in the Army General Staff, including Deputy Chief and then Chief of the Operations and Training Department of the Army General Staff. In August 2008, he assumed the position of deputy commander and Italian representative at the headquarters of the Allied Rapid Reactions Corps and, in this capacity, was deployed to Afghanistan for 15 months as Italy's senior representative.

Promoted to Lieutenant General on July 1, 2013, on November 24, 2014, he assumed command of the NATO Rapid Deployable Corps – Italy, a position he left on September 30, 2016 to take command of the Operational Land Forces Command on October 1, a position he left after more than sixteen months on February 16, 2018.

On February 21, 2018, he took command of Allied Joint Force Command Brunssum, replacing General Salvatore Farina. On March 31, 2019, Marchiò handed over command to German General Erhard Bühler, leaving active service.

== Awards and decorations ==
Military offices
Preceded by Salvatore Farina	Commander, AJFC Brunssum; 2018 – 2019	Succeeded by Erhard Bühler
