= Operation Eagle Guardian =

Eagle Guardian is a NATO regional defence scheme drawn up before 2010 to defend the Baltic states and Poland against an attack by Russia.

The plan identifies ports in Poland and Germany to receive naval assault forces, as well as British and US warships. Nine NATO divisions from the US, UK, Germany and Poland should carry out combat operations according to Article 5 of the NATO Charter in case of an armed aggression against the Baltic states or Poland.

U.S. Mission to NATO documents that mention Eagle Guardian include:

- 09USNATO588, Demarche Delivered on NATO Contingency Planning, 16 December 2009
- 09WARSAW1228, Poland could accept "Complementary" contingency, 18 December 2009
- 09USNATO532, Lithuanian MOD Discusses NATO contingency planning, 19 November 2009
- 10USNATO11, Polish Non-Paper on Baltic contingency planning, 11 January 2010
- 10USNATO35, NATO agrees to do contingency planning for the Baltic States
- 10STATE 007810

An associated operations plan is 'Constant Guardian.' (10USNATO11)
