= Salvatore Farina (general) =

Italian military officer

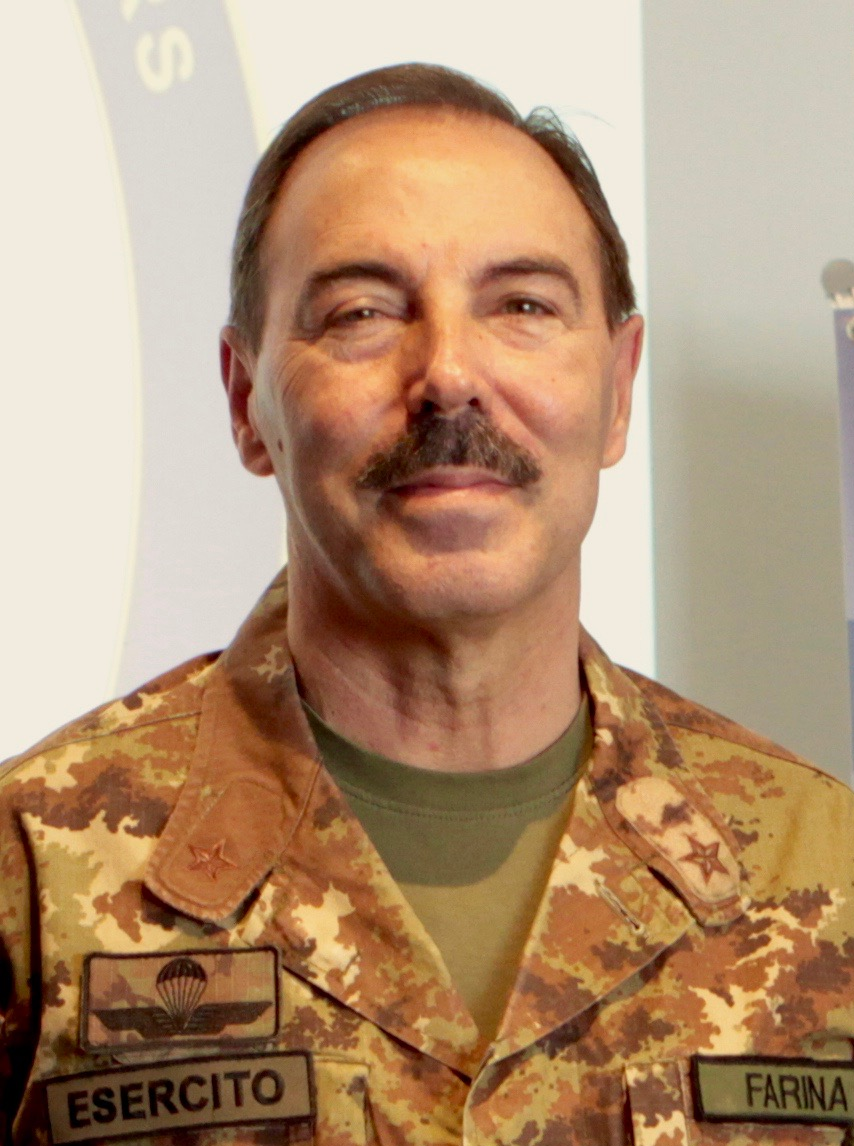
- Farina in 2017
- Born: 18 November 1957 (age 68); Gallipoli, Apulia
- Allegiance: Italy
- Branch: Esercito Italiano
- Service years: 1976–present
- Rank: Lieutenant General (I.s.)
- Commands: 1st Communications Regiment; Communication Brigade; Kosovo Force; JFC Brunssum; Chief of Army Staff
- Conflicts: Yugoslav Wars
- Awards: Knight Grand Cross, OMRI; Officer, Military Order of Italy; Officer, Legion of Merit

Salvatore Farina (born 18 November 1957) is an Italian Army general, and the former Chief of Army Staff. He previously served as commander of the Kosovo Force, the military attaché at the Embassy of Italy, London, and as the commander of Allied Joint Force Command Brunssum.

== Biography ==
Salvatore Farina has earned degrees in electrical engineering from the University of Padua, in strategic science from the University of Turin and in international politics and diplomatic relations from the University of Trieste. He entered the Italian Military Academy of Modena in 1976. He became Chief of Staff of the Italian Army on 27 February 2018.

On 15 February 2024, Pope Francis appointed Farina to be director of Infrastructure and Services within the Governorate of Vatican City State.

== Personal life ==
Salvatore Farina and his wife Amelia Gianna have two adult daughters and three granddaughters.

On 8 March 2020, he had tested positive for SARS-CoV-2, the virus that causes coronavirus disease 2019. He said he felt well and was self-isolating. It was also reported that he will be replaced by Federico Bonato until further notice.

== Awards and decorations ==
- Knight Grand Cross, Order of Merit of the Italian Republic – motu proprio, President of the Republic, 1 January 2018
- Officer, Military Order of Italy - Pristina, (Kosovo), September 2013 – September 2014, 9 July 2015

Military offices
Preceded by Hans-Lothar Domröse	Commander, AJFC Brunssum; 2016–2018	Succeeded by Riccardo Marchiò
Preceded by Danilo Errico	Chief of Staff of the Italian Army; 2018–	Incumbent
