= Allied Joint Force Command Brunssum =

NATO command

Joint Force Command Brunssum
- Active: AFCENT: 1953-2000; RHQ AFNORTH: 2000-2004; JFC-Brunssum: 2004-present
- Part of: Allied Command Operations, Casteau, Belgium
- Headquarters: Brunssum, Netherlands
- Motto: Many Nations: One Mission
- Website: jfcbs.nato.int

Commanders
- Commander: General Ingo Gerhartz; German Air Force
- Deputy Commander: Lieutenant General John Robert Mead; British Army
- Chief of Staff: Lieutenant General Maciej Klisz; Polish Land Forces
- Command Senior Enlisted Leader: Chief Warrant Officer Christian Thomassin; Canadian Army

The Allied Joint Force Command Brunssum (abbr. JFCBS) is a NATO command with its headquarters in Brunssum, Netherlands. It was established in 2004, as part of a reorganisation that reduced the number of NATO Military Command Structure headquarters.

== History ==
=== Allied Forces Central Europe from 1953 ===
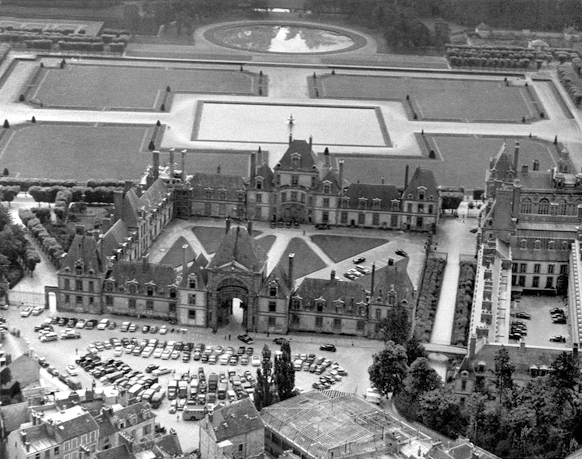
The Henry IV quarter at the Palace of Fontainebleau (48°24′10″N 2°42′8″E) in 1965. Prior to World War II these offices housed the Artillery School.

The command traces its history to Headquarters, Allied Forces Central Europe (AFCENT), which was activated in August 1953 in Fontainebleau, outside Paris, France.

Ensuring interoperability among land forces of the different NATO Member States has always been a challenge, which is why a variety of NATO standardization activities, such as the NATO Standardization Office, have been underway since the 1950s.

After General Dwight D. Eisenhower was appointed as Supreme Allied Commander Europe (SACEUR) in 1950, he found that devising command arrangements in the Central Region, which contained the bulk of NATO's forces, was to be complicated. General Eisenhower considered naming an overall Commander-in-Chief (CINC) for the Central Region but soon realized it would be difficult to find an arrangement that would satisfy all three major powers with forces in the Centre - the United States, United Kingdom and France - because their views on the proper relationship of air and ground power differed significantly. Moreover, he wanted to control the most important region, Central Region, himself.

Drawing upon his Second World War experience, Eisenhower decided to retain overall control himself and did not appoint a CINC for the Central Region. Instead there would be three separate commanders-in-chief (for Allied Air Forces Central Europe, Allied Land Forces Central Europe and Flag Officer Central Europe (FLAGCENT)), all reporting directly to SACEUR. Vice Admiral Robert Jaujard of the French Navy was appointed as Flag Officer Central Europe, and served from 2 April 51 until 20 August 1953. On 20 August 1953 General Ridgeway, Eisenhower's successor, established a single Commander-in-Chief (CINCENT) for the region with subordinate land, air and naval commanders (COMLANDCENT, COMAIRCENT, and COMNAVCENT respectively).

Arms of Allied Forces Central Europe, bearing the motto (supposedly that of Charlemagne) "In Scelus Exsurgo Sceleris Discrimina Purgo", which translates roughly as "I fight against Aggression and punish the Aggressor".

One of the command's exercises in the 1950s was Operation Counter Punch. Counter Punch was a September 1957 AFCENT air-ground military exercise that also tested NATO's integrated air-defense system in its central European front. The exercise involved the national air-defense systems of Britain, France, Belgium and the Netherlands, with Général d'Armée Jean-Étienne Valluy, French Army, NATO's Commander-in-Chief Allied Forces Central Europe (CINCENT), in overall command. Operation Counter Punch revealed deficiencies in the Integrated NATO Air Defense System as well as air force responsiveness to theoretical Soviet and Warsaw Pact ground advances.

After July 1962 and the establishment of Commander Allied Forces Baltic Approaches (COMBALTAP), German naval forces were shifted into that command. Thereafter there was no longer any need for the small headquarters of Allied Naval Forces Central Europe and its two subordinate commands, and they were disestablished in 1962, leaving naval liaison provided by a US naval officer.

AFCENT remained in France under French command until 1967, when France removed itself from the military command structure. The headquarters was moved to Brunssum in 1967 and activated under German command.

=== Subordinate AFCENT commands in 1989 ===
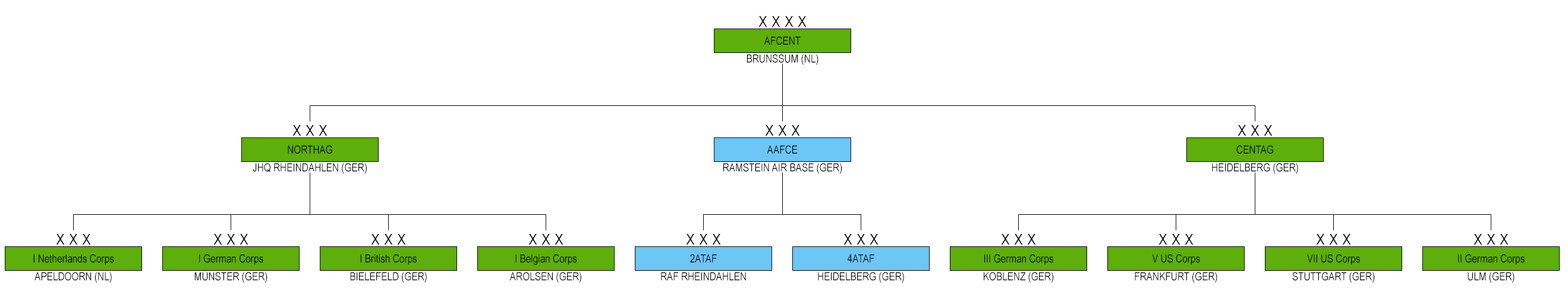
Command Structure of AFCENT in 1989 (click to enlarge)

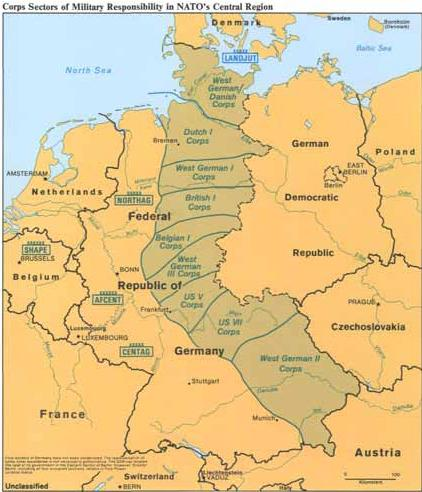
NATO corps sectors in the Central Region in the 1980s

During the Cold War, AFCENT commanded the following units:

- Allied Command Europe, in Mons, Belgium
  - Allied Forces Central Europe (AFCENT), in Brunssum, Netherlands
    - Northern Army Group (NORTHAG), at JHQ Rheindahlen, West Germany
      - I Dutch Corps
      - I German Corps
      - I British Corps
      - I Belgian Corps
    - Central Army Group (CENTAG), in Heidelberg, West Germany
      - III German Corps
      - V US Corps
      - VII US Corps
      - II German Corps
    - Allied Air Forces Central Europe (AAFCE), in Ramstein Air Base, West Germany
      - Second Allied Tactical Air Force (2 ATAF)
      - Fourth Allied Tactical Air Force (4 ATAF)

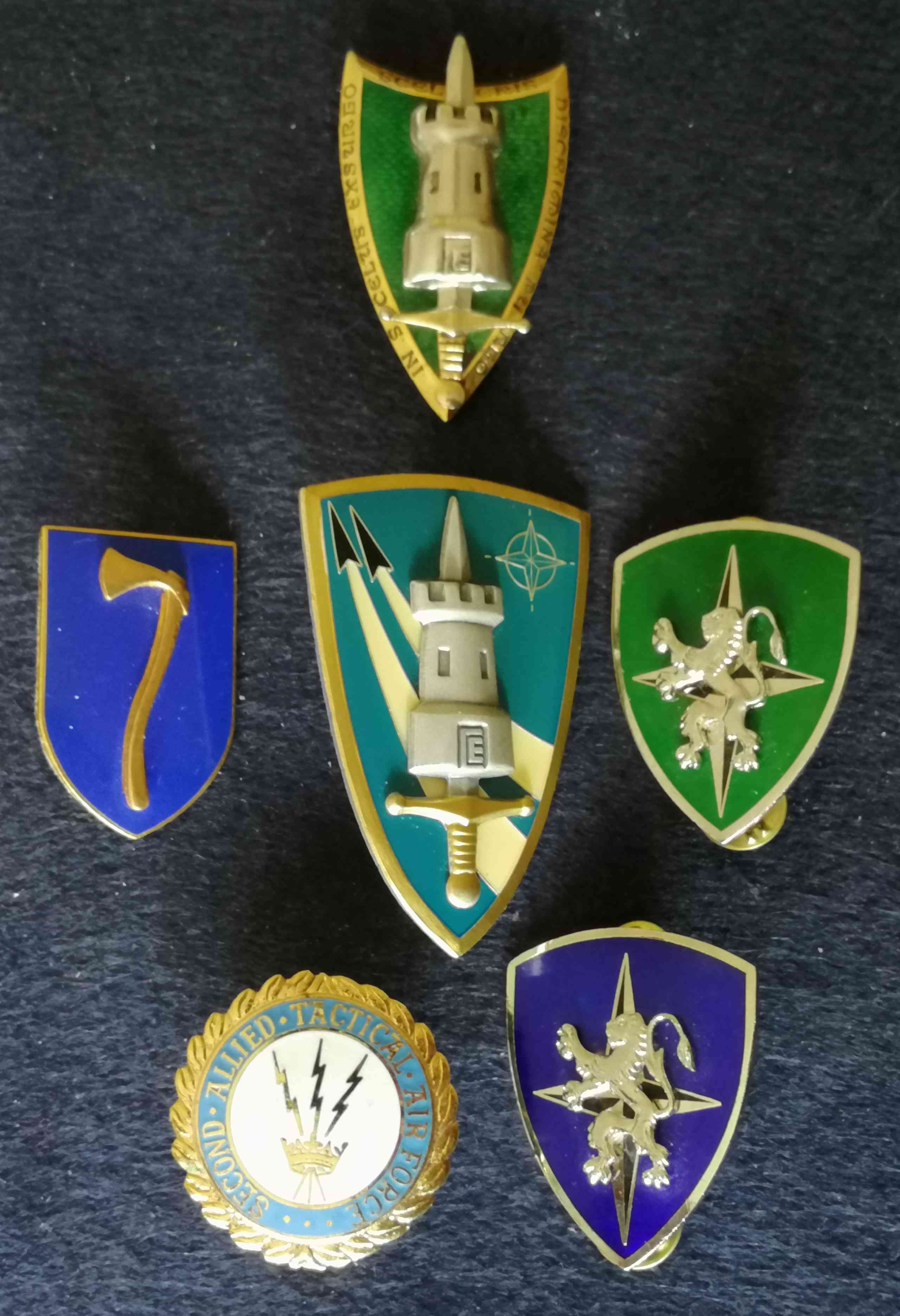
AFCENT command badges in the 1980s

The III Corps (US) was allocated as NORTHAG reserve. On activation, it would have deployed to Europe from bases in the United States. A forward element, 3rd Brigade, US 2nd Armored Division, was located at Garlstedt, Germany. The U.S. III Corps also maintained a forward headquarters at Tapijn Kazerne, Maastricht, Netherlands.

The commander of US Army Europe, Gen. William W. Crouch, assumed an additional role as commander of NATO LANDCENT on 15 February 1996. He was the first American to command LANDCENT since its 1993 activation. Originally, the LANDCENT command was to be rotated between German and Dutch generals. The dual command of United States Army Europe (USAREUR) and LANDCENT allowed the continued integration of US Army Europe into NATO's post-Cold War structure. All NATO corps, except for the de:IV. Korps (Bundeswehr), were then multinational. In the mid-late 1990s there were four multinational main defence corps in NATO's Central Region: one Danish-German (LANDJUT), one Dutch-German (I GE/NL Corps) and two German-United States (II GE/US and V US/GE). In addition, an agreement was made which set out the arrangements under which the European Corps, consisting of units from Belgium, France, Germany, Luxembourg and Spain, would be made available to NATO in times of crisis.

LANDCENT's missions were to:

1. Protect the peace and deter aggression in NATO's central region (Germany, Belgium, Luxemburg and the Netherlands).
2. Plan, prepare and direct operations of land forces under NATO command.
3. Plan, coordinate and conduct the land and air subcampaign jointly with NATO's Allied Air Command, Central.
4. Develop plans for, and participate in, the MCP and Partnership for Peace (PfP) initiative.
5. Support the flanks of the area of responsibilities.

The departure from the Cold War era brought the implementation of a new NATO Integrated Military Structure and LandCENT was formally designated Joint Headquarters Centre (JHQ CENT) in a ceremony held on March 9, 2000.

=== Establishment of JFC Brunssum ===
In 2000, the deactivation of Headquarters, Allied Forces Northern Europe (AFNORTH) in Kolsås, Norway led to the redesignation of AFCENT as Regional Headquarters, Allied Forces Northern Europe (RHQ AFNORTH). The headquarters operated as RHQ AFNORTH until 2004, when it was renamed Allied Joint Force Command Brunssum (JFC-B) to add flexibility to the military command structure by removing regional restrictions.

Circa 2010, JFC Brussum appears to be responsible for Contingency Plan Eagle Guardian, NATO's Article 5 plan to defend Poland, Lithuania, Latvia, and Estonia.

Until March 2013 Command Component Land Heidelberg (FC Heidelberg (Land)), the land component command, was under the control of this headquarter and located at Heidelberg in Germany.

== Facilities ==
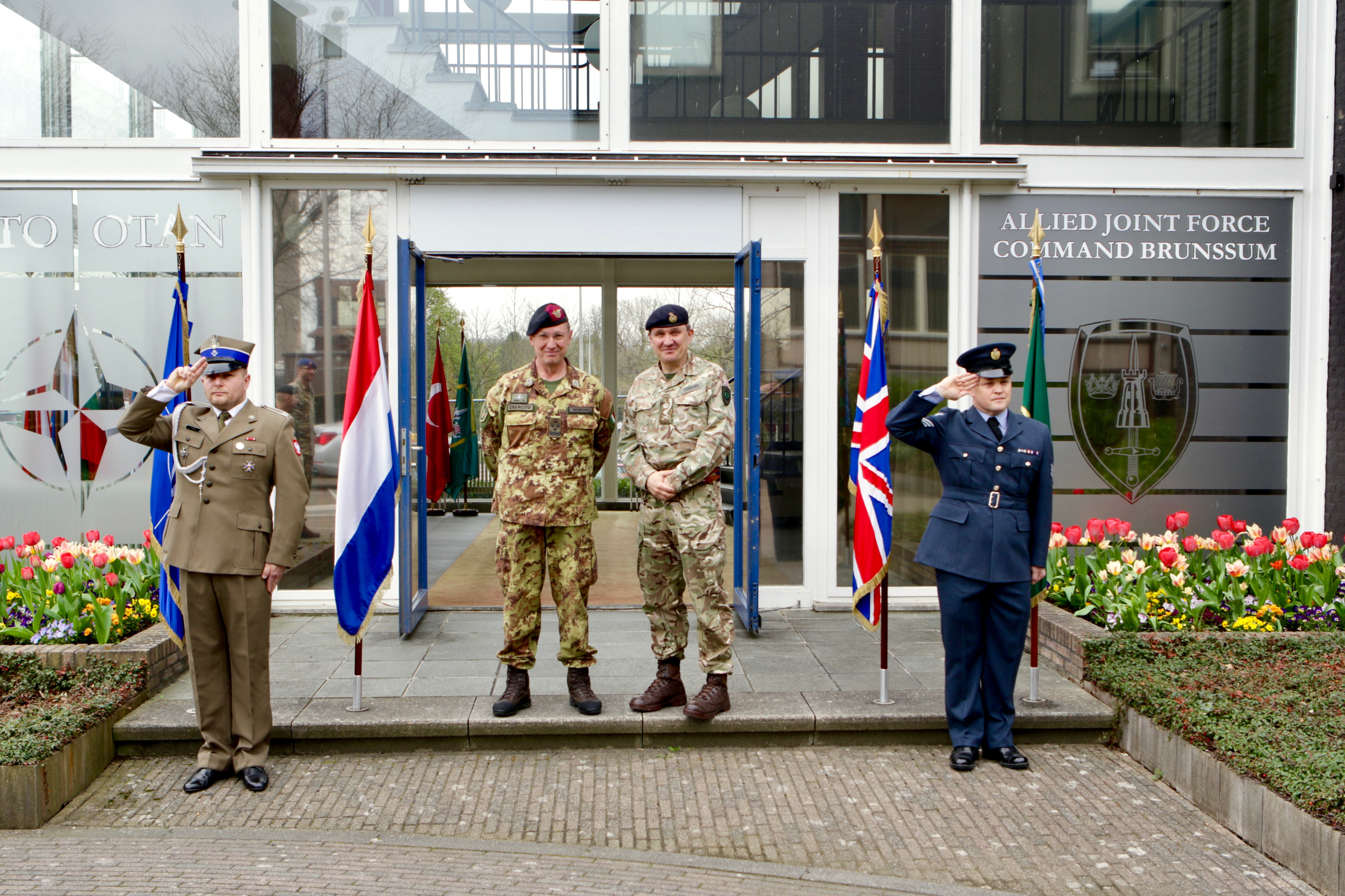
General Sir James Everard, Deputy Supreme Allied Commander Europe meets General Riccardo Marchiò, NATO JFC-B Commander at Brunssum during 2018

=== Hendrik van Nassau-Ouwerkerk Camp ===
Hendrik van Nassau-Ouwerkerk Camp is the headquarters and main base area of JFC Brunssum. Other organizations located on Hendrik van Nassau-Ouwerkerk Camp are the NATO Communication and Information Systems Services Agency, Sector Brunssum (NCSA-B) and the NATO Airborne Early Warning & Control Programme Management Agency (NAPMA).

Hendrik van Nassau-Ouwerkerk Camp also boasts an all ranks club called Club 13, a small tax-free department store called the B&S Store, a film theatre, a swimming pool, tennis courts and a gymnasium. Additional services are provided by the AAFES on US Army Garrison Brunssum.

=== Static War Headquarters Castlegate ===
Static War Headquarters Castlegate is a NATO command and communications bunker located approximately 2 km north-east of the town of Linnich, Germany. SWHQ Castlegate is operated in caretaker status by a German military contingent.

== Commanders ==
The commander of JFC-B is known as Commander, Joint Force Command Brunssum. The position was formerly known as Commander-in-Chief North (CINCNORTH) and Commander-in-Chief Central (CINCCENT). JFC-B is normally commanded by a German General.

No.	Portrait	Name	Title	Took office	Left office	Time in office	Country
1	Alphonse Juin	Alphonse Juin (1888–1967)	Commander in Chief, Allied Forces Central Europe	20 August 1953	September 1956	3 years	France
2	Jean Étienne Valluy	Jean Étienne Valluy (1899–1970)	Commander in Chief, Allied Forces Central Europe	October 1956	May 1960	3 years, 7 months	France
3	Maurice Challe	Maurice Challe (1905–1979)	Commander in Chief, Allied Forces Central Europe	May 1960	February 1961	9 months	France
4	Pierre-Elie Jacquot [fr]	Pierre-Elie Jacquot (1902–1984)	Commander in Chief, Allied Forces Central Europe	March 1961	December 1963	2 years, 10 months	France
5	Jean Albert Emile Crépin	Jean Albert Emile Crépin (Note: from July 1, 1966 France was no longer part of NATO's military command structure)	Commander in Chief, Allied Forces Central Europe	December 1963	June 1966	2 years, 6 months	France
6	Johann Adolf Graf von Kielmansegg	Johann Adolf Graf von Kielmansegg (1906–2006)	Commander in Chief, Allied Forces Central Europe	15 March 1967	1 April 1968	1 year	Germany
7	Jürgen Bennecke [de]	Jürgen Bennecke (1912–2002)	Commander in Chief, Allied Forces Central Europe	1 July 1968	30 September 1973	5 years, 2 months	Germany
8	Ernst Ferber [de]	Ernst Ferber (1914–1998)	Commander in Chief, Allied Forces Central Europe	1 October 1973	30 September 1975	1 year, 11 months	Germany
9	Karl Schnell [de]	Karl Schnell (1916–2008)	Commander in Chief, Allied Forces Central Europe	1 October 1975	7 January 1977	1 year, 3 months	Germany
10	Franz-Joseph Schulze	Franz-Joseph Schulze (1918–2005)	Commander in Chief, Allied Forces Central Europe	7 January 1977	30 September 1979	2 years, 8 months	Germany
11	Ferdinand von Senger und Etterlin	Ferdinand von Senger und Etterlin (1923–1987)	Commander in Chief, Allied Forces Central Europe	1 October 1979	28 September 1983	3 years, 11 months	Germany
12	Leopold Chalupa [de]	Leopold Chalupa (1927–2021)	Commander in Chief, Allied Forces Central Europe	28 September 1983	1 October 1987	4 years	Germany
13	Hans-Henning von Sandrart [de]	Hans-Henning von Sandrart (1933–2013)	Commander in Chief, Allied Forces Central Europe	1 October 1987	27 September 1991	3 years, 11 months	Germany
14	Henning von Ondarza [de]	Henning von Ondarza (born 1933)	Commander in Chief, Allied Forces Central Europe	27 September 1991	23 March 1994	2 years, 5 months	Germany
15	Helge Hansen	Helge Hansen (born 1936)	Commander in Chief, Allied Forces Central Europe	1 April 1994	March 1996	1 year, 11 months	Germany
16	Dieter Stöckmann	Dieter Stöckmann (born 1941)	Commander in Chief, Allied Forces Central Europe	March 1996	30 March 1998	2 years	Germany
17	Joachim Spiering [de]	Joachim Spiering (1940–2023) (Note: Commander in Chief, Allied Forces Central Europe until March 3, 2000)	Commander in Chief Allied Forces North Europe	30 March 1998	March 2001	2 years, 11 months	Germany
18	Sir Jack Deverell	Sir Jack Deverell (born 1945)	Commander in Chief Allied Forces North Europe	March 2001	January 2004	2 years, 10 months	United Kingdom
19	Gerhard W. Back [de]	Gerhard W. Back (born 1944) (Note: Commander in Chief Allied Forces North Europe until July 1, 2004)	Allied Joint Force Command Brunssum	January 2004	26 January 2007	3 years	Germany
20	Egon Ramms	Egon Ramms (born 1948)	Allied Joint Force Command Brunssum	26 January 2007	29 September 2010	3 years, 8 months	Germany
21	Wolf-Dieter Langheld [de]	Wolf-Dieter Langheld (born 1950)	Allied Joint Force Command Brunssum	29 September 2010	14 December 2012	2 years, 2 months	Germany
22	Hans-Lothar Domröse	Hans-Lothar Domröse (born 1952)	Allied Joint Force Command Brunssum	14 December 2012	3 March 2016	3 years, 2 months	Germany
23	Salvatore Farina	Salvatore Farina (born 1957)	Allied Joint Force Command Brunssum	4 March 2016	16 February 2018	1 year, 11 months	Italy
24	Riccardo Marchiò	Riccardo Marchiò (born 1955)	Allied Joint Force Command Brunssum	16 February 2018	31 March 2019	1 year, 1 month	Italy
25	Erhard Bühler	Erhard Bühler (born 1956)	Allied Joint Force Command Brunssum	31 March 2019	22 April 2020	1 year	Germany
26	Jörg Vollmer	Jörg Vollmer (born 1957)	Allied Joint Force Command Brunssum	22 April 2020	3 June 2022	2 years, 1 month	Germany
27	Guglielmo Miglietta [de]	Guglielmo Miglietta (born 1961)	Allied Joint Force Command Brunssum	3 June 2022	11 June 2025	3 years	Italy
28	Ingo Gerhartz	Ingo Gerhartz (born 1965)	Allied Joint Force Command Brunssum	11 June 2025	Incumbent	1 year, 3 months	Germany
