= Giorgio Liuzzi =

Italian soldier

Giorgio Liuzzi (1895–1983) was an Italian soldier that was named chief of the staff of Italian Army in 1954.

== Biography ==
Born in Vercelli, son of Italian army officer Guido Liuzzi, he was accepted to the Modena Military Academy in 1913. In 1915, he was named sottotenente in the 1st Artillery regiment. Liuzzi was wounded twice during World War I, and at the end of war he was a captain on the staff of the 27th Army Corps.
After the war, he was part of the Allied Military Commission in Wien. Between World War I and World War II, Liuzzi assumed different duties in the Regio Esercito. In 1938, as colonel in command of the "1st Celere Artillery Regiment", Liuzzi was the director of the military parade that took place during the visit of Adolf Hitler in Rome. In the same year, Liuzzi, a Jew, was expelled from the army after the promulgation of the Leggi Razziali.
After some years in forced retirement, Liuzzi joined the new Italian Royal Army in 1943 and served as a liaison officer with the British 8th Army.

In the post-war years, Liuzzi assumed many important duties and led the Ariete Armored Brigade and the Granatieri di Sardegna division. In 1954 he was named commander of V army corps. Later in 1954, Liuzzi was named Chief of Staff of the Italian Army. Liuzzi left his post in 1959 and died in Milan in 1983.
