= Enrico Cosenz =

19th-century Italian army officer

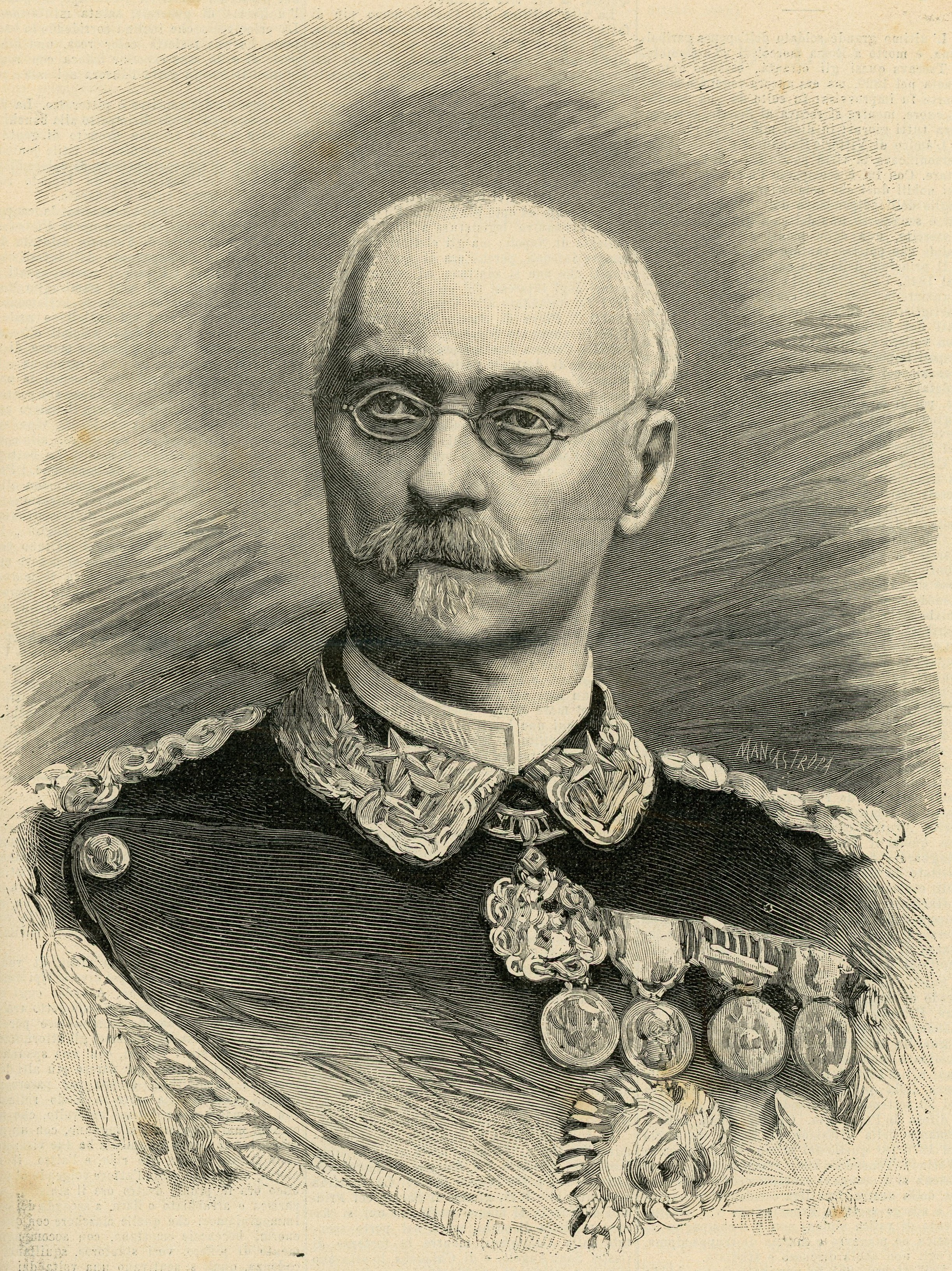
Enrico Cosenz

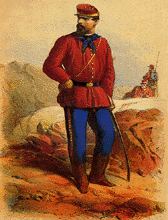
Enrico Cosenz.

Enrico Cosenz (12 January 1820 – 7 August 1898) was an Italian soldier born at Gaeta.

As captain of artillery in the Neapolitan army, he took part in the expedition sent by Ferdinand II against the Austrians in 1848; but after the coup d'etat at Naples, he followed General Guglielmo Pepe in disobeying Ferdinand's order for the withdrawal of the troops, and proceeded to Venice to aid in defending that city. As commandant of the fort of Marghera, Cosenz displayed distinguished valor, and after the fall of the fort assumed the defence of the Piazzale, where he was twice wounded.

Upon the fall of Venice he fled to Corfu and in France. In 1859, in the wake of the Second Independence War, Cosenz went to Piedmont, where he assumed the command of a Hunters of the Alps (Cacciatori delle Alpi) regiment, fighting in the Battle of Varese.

He entered in the Sardinian army, only to exit in order to participate in the Spedizione dei Mille (Expedition of the Thousand), led by Garibaldi, that ultimately freed Sicily from Bourbon rule. In 1860 he conducted the third Garibaldian expedition to Sicily, defeated two Neapolitan brigades at Piale (August 23), and marched victoriously upon Naples, where he was appointed minister of war, and took part in organizing the plebiscite. He then rejoined the Italian Army with the rank of Lieutenant general; during the war of 1866 he was given command of a division, which however saw little combat.

After the war he repeatedly declined the portfolio of war. In 1882 he became the first Chief of Staff of the Regio Esercito, and held that position until 1893. He died at Rome in 1898, aged 78.

== Commemoration ==
The Italian Regia Marina (Royal Navy) destroyer Agostino Bertani was renamed Enrico Cosenz in 1921 in honor of Cosenz.

Military offices
Preceded by New Position	Chief of Staff of the Regio Esercito; 1882–1893	Succeeded by Domenico Primerano
