= Josh Gruenbaum =

American lawyer (born 1985/1986)

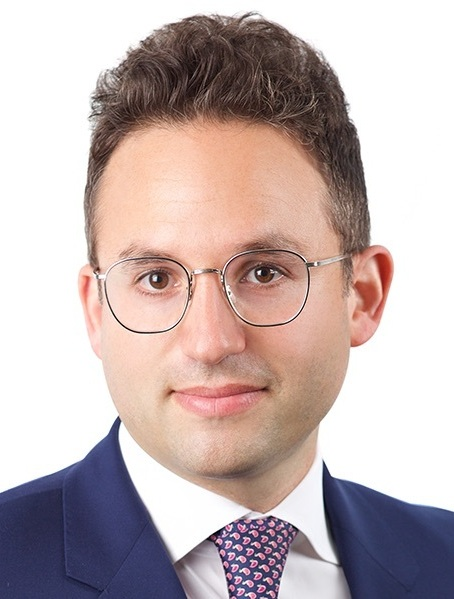
- Official portrait, 2025

Senior Advisor to the Board of Peace
- Incumbent
- Assumed office January 2026 Serving with Aryeh Lightstone
- Appointed by: Donald Trump
- Preceded by: Office established

Commissioner of the Federal Acquisition Service
- In office c. February 2025 – April 17, 2026
- President: Donald Trump
- Deputy: Laura Stanton
- Preceded by: Tom Howder (acting)
- Succeeded by: Laura Stanton (acting)

Personal details
- Born: Joshua Gruenbaum; 1985 or 1986 (age 40–41)
- Education: New York University (MBA, JD)

Joshua Gruenbaum (born 1985 or 1986) is an American lawyer who served as the commissioner of the Federal Acquisition Service from 2025 to 2026.

Gruenbaum graduated from New York University with a Master of Business Administration and a Juris Doctor. He worked for KKR & Co. as a director. In January 2025, Stephen Ehikian, the acting administrator of general services, named Gruenbaum as the commissioner of the Federal Acquisition Service. Gruenbaum's work, which was closely aligned with the Department of Government Efficiency, included eliminating contracts and implementing artificial intelligence. He served as a member of the Joint Task Force to Combat Anti-Semitism.

Months into Gruenbaum's tenure, he began to seek involvement in geopolitical affairs, particularly alongside Jared Kushner and Steve Witkoff. He was involved in the Gaza peace plan and in peace negotiations to end the Russo-Ukrainian war. In January 2026, Gruenbaum was appointed to be a senior advisor to the Board of Peace. In April, he left the Federal Acquisition Service, and continued working with Kushner and Witkoff. Gruenbaum continued to work at the General Services Administration until May.

== Early life and education ==
Joshua Gruenbaum was born in 1985 or 1986. Gruenbaum graduated from New York University with a Master of Business Administration and a Juris Doctor in 2016. According to The Washington Post, he reportedly confronted a student group affiliated with Students for Justice in Palestine at New York University.

== Career ==
Gruenbaum worked for Moelis & Company. In 2020, he began working for KKR & Co. as a director on its credit team.

== Commissioner of the Federal Acquisition Service (2025–2026) ==
=== Appointment and initial tenure ===
On January 20, 2025, Stephen Ehikian, the acting administrator of general services, named Gruenbaum as the commissioner of the Federal Acquisition Service. He was appointed in February. According to Politico, Ehikian and Gruenbaum were allies of Steve Davis, an executive who oversaw the Department of Government Efficiency; The New York Times considered Gruenbaum to be an ally of the Department of Government Efficiency. At the Federal Acquisition Service, Gruenbaum sought to dismiss staffers, eliminate certain functions, and implement artificial intelligence. In March, executives at several consulting firms, including Ernst & Young and Guidehouse, met with Gruenbaum to justify their federal contracts, according to The Wall Street Journal. He was involved in negotiating deals to implement artificial intelligence in the federal government and in canceling federal grants to California.

By March 2025, Gruenbaum had become a member of the Joint Task Force to Combat Anti-Semitism. According to The Wall Street Journal, he led much of its activities alongside Sean Keveney, the acting general counsel of the Department of Health and Human Services, and Tom Wheeler, the acting general counsel of the Department of Education. After a letter sent by Keveney to Harvard University set off a confrontation between the university and the Trump administration, Gruenbaum attempted to resolve the conflict by stating that the letter had been sent without authorization. He contributed to the Compact for Academic Excellence in Higher Education. Gruenbaum told The New Yorker in October 2025 that he would threaten federal contracts at universities in an effort to fight campus antisemitism.

After Elon Musk's tenure as a special government employee elapsed in May 2025, the White House Presidential Personnel Office informed government employees that Davis had been dismissed and that no worker should be in contact with him. According to Politico, Davis appointed Ehikian; Gruenbaum; and Anthony Armstrong, a senior advisor at the Office of Personnel Management, to lead the Department of Government Efficiency and dispatched them to assess the loyalty of personnel across the government. Amid the Trump–Musk feud, Gruenbaum made several requests for SpaceX contracts to numerous federal agencies. In July, Trump appointed Michael Rigas to serve as the acting administrator of general services, in a maneuver that ended Ehikian's tenure as acting administrator and prevented Gruenbaum from having greater authority over the General Services Administration. According to Politico, Gruenbaum remained "highly involved" at the General Services Administration, despite the Trump administration's efforts to eliminate Musk's involvement in the agency. Ehikian and Gruenbaum continued to lead OneGov, an initiative by the Department of Government Efficiency to negotiate better rates from software companies, and allowed foreign contractors to work on projects for the Department of Government Efficiency, an internal point of contention.

In March 2025, Gruenbaum invested between US$100,001 to US$250,000 in an investment fund for Joshua Kushner's Thrive Capital. He advocated for the federal government to award a contract to Ramp, a financial technology company with funding from Thrive Capital, to improve the government's SmartPay expense card program and organized meetings with Ramp executives. Gruenbaum reportedly asked representatives from Ramp if the company could handle the General Services Administration's business, but not other rival bidders, a possible violation of federal contracting regulations. An official at the agency told The Wall Street Journal that Gruenbaum recused himself from the procurement process, that he did not advocate for Ramp's business specifically, and that he believed that the contracting process was over when he asked about Ramp's capacity. The incident prompted an investigation from the General Services Administration's deputy general counsel. Edward Forst rejected the contract after being sworn in as the administrator of the general services. In January 2026, the Federal Acquisition Service awarded a contract to Databricks, another Thrive-funded software company.

=== Diplomatic work ===
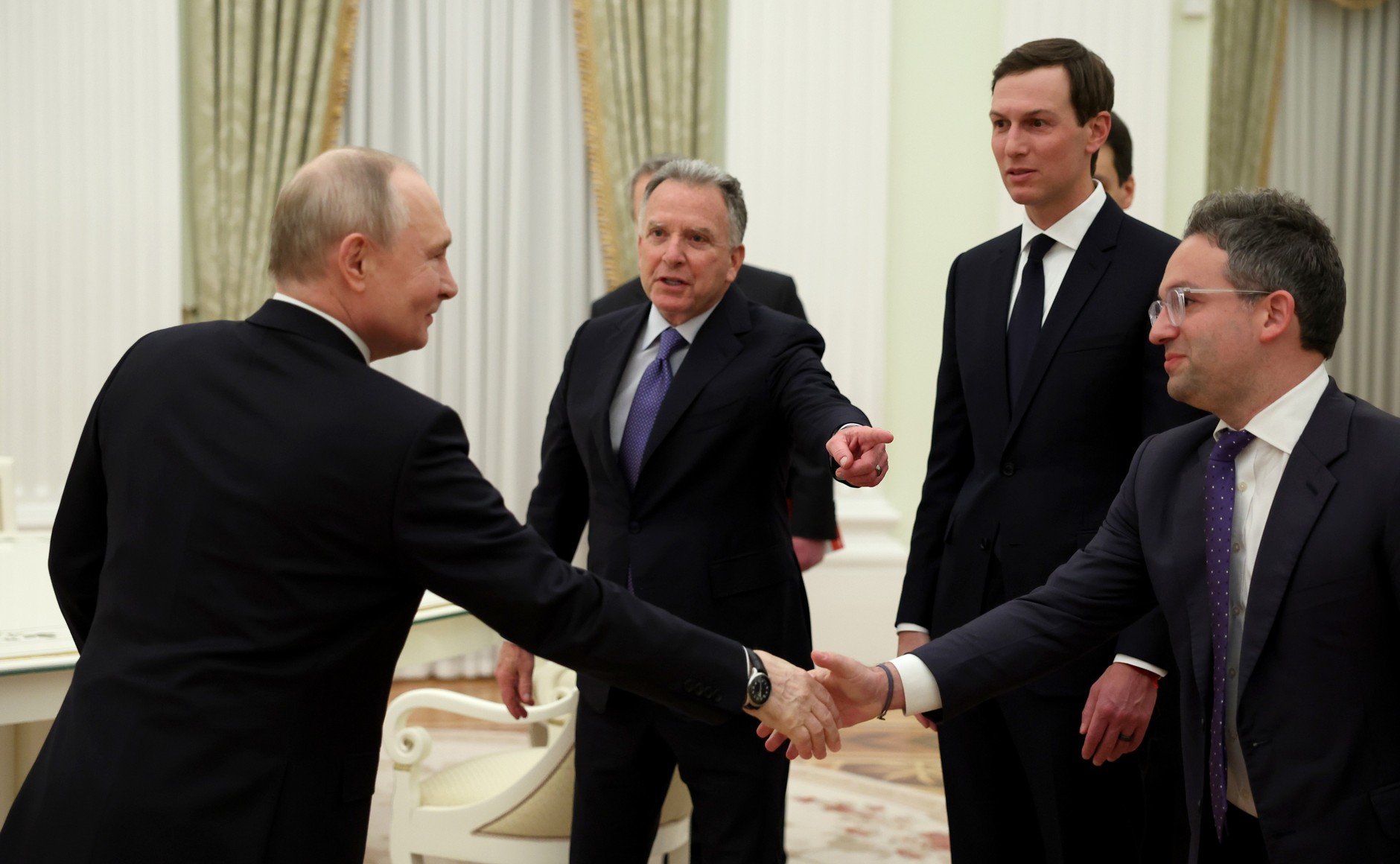
Gruenbaum with Vladimir Putin in January 2026

According to The Wall Street Journal, Gruenbaum offered his assistance in procuring hypersonic missiles for the Department of Defense, a request that was perceived by some officials in the Office of Management and Budget as a joke. He was among several staffers who helped work on the Gaza peace plan alongside Jared Kushner and Steve Witkoff. Gruenbaum contributed to Kushner and Witkoff's plan to construct luxury high-rise buildings along Gaza's coast. Kushner, Witkoff, and Gruenbaum additionally spoke to Russian president Vladimir Putin's special envoy, Kirill Dmitriev, at Mar-a-Lago in December 2025. The following month, Gruenbaum was named as a special advisor to Trump's Board of Peace. He met with Putin alongside Kushner and Witkoff and was dispatched to the 56th World Economic Forum.

As the Board of Peace stalled in April 2026, Gruenbaum requested that European companies assist in the board's National Committee for the Administration of Gaza. That month, Forst requested that Gruenbaum resign; Gruenbaum told The Wall Street Journal that he had already planned to voluntarily resign. He remained at the General Services Administration as a senior advisor until May. After his resignation, Gruenbaum was detailed to the White House to work for Witkoff. In April, Politico reported that Gruenbaum had fallen out of favor with officials in the Trump administration for his reportedly brash style and penchant for self-promotion. He continued to advise Kushner and Witkoff on Gaza.
