= Hana Tarazi =

Palestinian technocrat

- هناء الترزي

Commissioner for Social and Women's Affairs of the National Committee for the Administration of Gaza
- Incumbent
- Assumed office 14 January 2026
- Chief Commissioner: Ali Shaath
- Preceded by: Office established

Personal details
- Education: Al-Azhar University

Hana Tarazi (Arabic: هناء الترزي), is a Palestinian technocrat, lawyer and social activist who currently manages social welfare and women's affairs for the National Committee for the Administration of Gaza (NCAG). Tarazi, a member of the Gazan Christian community, is the only woman and Palestinian Christian on the committee. She is the first Gazan Christian to hold public office since Husam al-Tawil in 2006.

== Biography ==
Tarazi studied law at and graduated from Al-Azhar University in Cairo, Egypt, becoming the first Christian to do so, and became the first female Christian lawyer in the Gaza Strip. In May 2018 she successfully applied for a license to practice sharia, and passed her exams, receiving that license on 16 May. She then began working in both the sharia and civil law spheres, and became deputy director of the Al-Mezan Center for Human Rights.

Following the onset of the Gaza war in October 2023, Tarazi dedicated herself to community work. Later, she became a member of the NCAG, which is set to succeed the Hamas administration, and left Gaza for Cairo. On 14 January 2026, she was formally announced as a member of the committee, alongside 14 other Gazan technocrats. However, as of 20 January, Israel has blocked the NCAG members from entering Gaza, for unclear reasons, with Egypt and the United States attempting to facilitate the committee's entry.

In her inaugural message to the citizens of Gaza, she expressed sadness over the destruction wrought by the war, stating that suffering could not be the permanent destiny of the Palestinian people, and committed to promoting unity and equality. Like the rest of the committee, Tarazi is politically unaffiliated. She is reported to have significant popularity among the Gazan public.

== See also ==
- Gaza peace plan
- List of Palestinian Christians
