= Osama Al Saadawi =

Palestinian politician and engineer

Osama Al-Saadawi
- أسامة السعداوي

Minister of State for Leadership and Empowerment of the State of Palestine
- Incumbent
- Assumed office 14 April 2019
- President: Mahmoud Abbas

Commissioner for Land and Housing of the National Committee for the Administration of Gaza
- Incumbent
- Assumed office 14 January 2026
- Chief Commissioner: Ali Shaath
- Preceded by: Office established

Personal details
- Born: 11 February 1964 (age 62) Rafah, Gaza Strip
- Party: Fatah
- Education: Birzeit University; Islamic University of Gaza

Osama Hassan Saad Al-Sadaawi (Arabic: أسامة حسن سعد السعداوي; born February 11, 1964) is a Palestinian engineer and entrepreneur who currently serves as the Minister of State for Entrepreneurship and Empowerment in the government of Mohammed Shtayyeh.

== Early life and education ==
Osama Al-Sadaawi was born in the refugee camps of Rafah city in the southern Gaza Strip. He received his education there, and his origin traces back to the destroyed village of Aqir in the 1948 Arab–Israeli War. He studied civil engineering at Birzeit University and obtained his bachelor's degree. Later, he earned a master's degree in civil engineering from the Islamic University of Gaza.

== Career ==
Osama Al-Sadaawi has held several positions, including the position of General Manager of the Palestinian Housing Council in the Gaza Strip. Osama Al-Sadaawi took the legal oath before Palestinian President Mahmoud Abbas as the Minister of Entrepreneurship and Empowerment on April 13, 2019, in the government of Dr. Mohammed Shtayyeh. In January 2026, he became a member of the National Committee for the Administration of Gaza.
