= United Nations Security Council Resolution 2803 =

United Nations resolution adopted in 2025

UN Security Council Resolution 2803
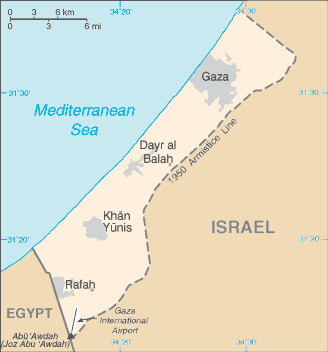
- Map of the Gaza Strip
- Date: 17 November 2025
- Meeting no.: 10,046
- Code: S/RES/2803 (Document)
- Subject: The situation in the Middle East, including the Palestinian question
- Voting summary: 13 voted for; None voted against; 2 abstained
- Result: Adopted

Security Council composition
- Permanent members: China; France; Russia; United Kingdom; United States
- Non-permanent members: Algeria; Denmark; Greece; Guyana; South Korea; Pakistan; Panama; Sierra Leone; Slovenia; Somalia

United Nations Security Council Resolution 2803 was passed on 17 November 2025 to give effect to the Gaza peace plan agreed by Israel and Hamas in October 2025. The resolution was welcomed by the Palestinian Authority and denounced by Hamas.

== Process ==
The initial draft, which would give a two-year mandate to the International Stabilization Force and set up a Board of Peace, was circulated by the United States on 3 November 2025. A revised draft, which sets benchmarks for Israeli withdrawal tied to Hamas disarmament and requires six-monthly progress reports to be submitted to the Security Council, was reported on 10 November. It welcomes the formation of a Board of Peace and describes it as a transitional governing body to oversee the administration of Gaza. A further revised draft, which included a clause supporting Palestinian self-determination and statehood, was circulated on 13 November. The same day, Russia proposed an alternative draft which would support options for an International Stabilization Force, but removed references to the Board of Peace. On 14 November, the United States, together with the Muslim-majority countries of Qatar, Egypt, the United Arab Emirates, Saudi Arabia, Indonesia, Pakistan, Jordan, and Turkey, issued a joint statement urging the Security Council to adopt the latest version of the United States draft. The statement was welcomed by the Palestinian Authority. The United Kingdom also issued a statement in support of the United States proposed draft resolution. A final draft was presented to the Security Council at its 10,046th meeting on 17 November 2025 as Document S/2025/748.

=== Voting ===
Thirteen countries voted in favour of adopting the resolution, including P5 members France, the United Kingdom and the United States. The remaining two P5 countries, China and Russia, abstained from voting.
Permanent members of the Security Council are in bold.

| Approved (13) | Abstained (2) | Opposed (0) |
|---|---|---|
| Algeria; Denmark; **France**; Greece; Guyana; South Korea; Pakistan; Panama; Sierra Leone; Slovenia; Somalia; **United Kingdom**; **United States** | **China**; **Russia** | |

== Provisions ==
The resolution endorses the Gaza peace plan, welcomes the formation of a Board of Peace to support the reconstruction of the Gaza Strip, authorizes the deployment of the International Stabilization Force and allows for the establishment of a National Committee for the Administration of Gaza to manage day-to-day governance in the Gaza Strip.

== Reactions ==
=== United Nations Security Council Members ===
Permanent members

- China: China abstained from the vote. Ambassador to the UN Fu Cong stated that the draft resolution contained only "skimpy details" of the "structure, composition, terms of reference, and participation criteria" of the ISF and BOP but also stressed the imperative and fragility of the ceasefire in Gaza.
- France: France welcomed the resolution adding that "The implementation of this resolution must take place within a clear political and legal framework, in line with relevant Security Council resolutions, internationally agreed parameters, and the New York Declaration on the implementation of the two-state solution,"
- Russia: Russia abstained from the vote. Ambassador Vasily Nebenzia stated the resolution is "giving complete control over the Gaza strip to the Board of Peace."
- United States: Ambassador to the UN, Mike Waltz, expressed gratitude towards nations that joined the U.S. in charting resolution. He stated that the resolution "represents another significant step towards a stable Gaza that will be able to prosper and an environment that will allow Israel to live in security".

Non-permanent members

- Algeria: The permanent representative of the Democratic and Popular Republic of Algeria voted in favor of the resolution. He said that Algeria believed that genuine peace in the Middle East could not be achieved “without justice for the Palestinian people who have waited for decades for the establishment of their independent State.” He also noted that the text had received the support of Arab and Muslim countries including the Palestine Liberation Organization.
- Pakistan: The permanent representative of the Islamic Republic of Pakistan to the United Nations voted in favor of the resolution. However, he said that Pakistan was not completely content with the result and cautioned that "certain important recommendations" from Pakistan were omitted from the final document.

=== Israel and Palestine ===
- Israel: Israeli prime minister Benjamin Netanyahu welcomed the resolution stating that "we believe that President Trump's plan will lead to peace and prosperity because it insists upon full demilitarization, disarmament, and the deradicalization of Gaza."
- Palestine: The Palestinian Authority issued a statement welcoming the resolution, and said that it was ready to take part in its implementation.

=== Other states ===
- Egypt: Egyptian president, Abdel Fattah el-Sisi, and British Prime Minister, Keir Starmer, both emphasized the need to build on the resolution to solidify the ceasefire, ensure the flow of humanitarian aid, and lay the groundwork for the swift start of reconstruction efforts.
- Indonesia:Indonesia welcomes the ratification of the UN Security Council Resolution on Gaza, which aims to maintain the ceasefire and ensure the distribution of humanitarian aid in Gaza, Palestine. The resolution also prioritizes conflict resolution and sustainable peace through strengthening the capacity of the Palestinian Authority, reconstruction assistance, and peacekeeping by a UN-mandated international stabilization force.
- Iran: Iran's foreign ministry expressed serious concern about the provisions of the resolution.
- Kazakhstan: Kazakhstan's foreign ministry welcomed the resolution, describing it as a "crucial step toward resolving the situation in the Gaza Strip".
- Japan: Japanese Foreign Minister, Motegi Toshimitsu, welcomed the adoption of the resolution, commended diplomatic efforts which led to the resolution's adoption, and stated that priority should be given to "maintenance of the ceasefire."

=== International organizations ===
- European Union: The European Commission welcomed the resolution, describing it as an "an important step towards ending the conflict" and expressed its willingness to be part of the Board of Peace.
- United Nations: Antonio Guterres, the Secretary-General of the United Nations, welcomed the resolution and urged all parties to: "turn this momentum into concrete action".
  - Francesca Albanese, the U.N. Special Rapporteur on the situation of human rights in the Palestinian territories, criticized the resolution as deeply perplexing by not upholding "international human rights law, including the right of self-determination" and risking the entrenchment of "external control over Gaza’s governance, borders, security, and reconstruction" by betraying "the people it claims to protect" and leaving Palestine in the "hands of a puppet administration."

=== Non-state actors ===
- Hamas denounced the resolution, saying it would be replacing Israeli occupation with "foreign guardianship" and that it did not meet the "political and humanitarian demands and rights" of the Palestinian people.
- The International Federation of Human Rights called the resolution "shocking" and stated that it "effectively strips Palestinians of their right to self-determination" through the creation of a foreign-led governing body without any "international crimes or transitional justice mechanisms".
- The Quaker United Nations Office praised some parts of the resolution but expressed concern with the resolution’s "disregard for the consent or agency of Palestinians within the mechanisms proposed by the resolution" and said that the resolution "falls far short of what this moment in history requires."
- The Palestinian NGOs Network and the Palestinian Human Rights Organizations Council jointly condemned the resolution, stating that it normalizes the "colonial occupation of Palestinian territory", which violates the "inalienable right of the Palestinian people to self-determination," in turn, making the U.N. "complicit in Israel's international crimes." They asserted that it threatens the "integrity of the whole international legal system."
- La Via Campesina, an international farmers organization, firmly rejected the resolution. They argued that it "converts the Israeli occupation into a formalized internationalized occupation" aimed at erasing "Palestinian people’s inalienable right to self-determination." They called upon all countries and individuals to reject the resolution.
- Physicians for Human Rights and the Global Human Rights Clinic at the University of Chicago Law School urged that "the needs of women of reproductive age and infants" not be overlooked during rehabilitation and recovery efforts, for the end of all "violence against health care...unconditional and unhindered humanitarian access," and the advancement of "accountability, justice, and reparations."
- The Cairo Institute for Human Rights Studies expressed serious concern with the resolution, saying that it failed to address "root causes and ongoing structural impediments" that had prevented peace in the past, and called for "urgently amend[ing] or supplement[ing]" the resolution with "an unequivocal timetable to end Israel’s occupation, and a credible process to ensure the cessation of Israel’s acts of genocide, ethnic cleansing, apartheid, and illegal annexation of land" while recognizing the "Palestinian right to self-determination...free from regional and international hegemony."
- The Meir Amit Intelligence and Terrorism Information Center, which has close ties to the Israel Defense Forces, stated that it was unclear whether the resolution could be implemented, predicting that rejection by Hamas and other paramilitary organizations to disarm, and seeing the international force as occupiers, would lead to friction and violent responses "which might also affect IDF forces" and predicted that there would be a governance vacuum allowing "Hamas to continue securing its security and civilian governance in the [Gaza] Strip."

=== Other responses ===
- Laurie Nathan, Mediation Program Director of the Kroc Institute for International Peace Studies, at the University of Notre Dame, called the resolution "not a viable path to peace, security and stability" but a "recipe for further conflict" instead.
- Zahan Hasan of the Carnegie Endowment for International Peace asserted that the resolution legitimized "indefinite Israeli control over Gaza in partnership with the United States" and supported Israeli plans to stop Palestinian statehood.
- Carol Daniel-Kasbari of the Quincy Institute for Responsible Statecraft said that the resolution "risks becoming yet another U.S.–run occupation" which could "fuel support for armed groups and...drag the U.S. into an indefinite security commitment" and called upon the U.S. government to reshape the resolution to ensure "post-genocide safeguards...Palestinian co-ownership...[and] a rights-anchored transition and exit."
- Samiksha Mukherjee and Sanmay Moitra expressed concern in an article for Just Security, an independent journal based at the New York University School of Law, that the resolution had "the appearances of neo-imperialism." They called it "potentially unlawful under international law" while not effectively advancing "Palestinian self-determination nor Israeli security concerns."
- Yoko Hawari, co-director of Al-Shabaka, condemned the resolution for imposing "colonial control over the Palestinian people in Gaza" and called for rejection of the resolution and its "colonial logic."
- New Jewish Narrative welcomed the passage of the resolution, asserting that it provided "international legitimacy and legal grounding to the ISF."
- Emmanuel Navon of the Jerusalem Institute for Strategy and Security said that the resolution was a test of whether Israel could "leverage global legitimacy without compromising its vital interests."

== See also ==
- List of United Nations resolutions concerning Palestine
- List of United Nations Security Council Resolutions 2801 to 2900 (2025–present)
- United Nations Security Council Resolution 745 (Cambodia)
- United Nations Security Council Resolution 1037 (Eastern Slavonia)
- United Nations Security Council Resolution 1244 (Kosovo)
- United Nations Security Council Resolution 1272 (East Timor)
- Gaza Strip under Resolution 2803
- List of territories administered by the United Nations
