= National Committee for the Administration of Gaza =

Committee for civilian affairs in the Gaza Strip

- اللجنة الوطنية لإدارة غزة
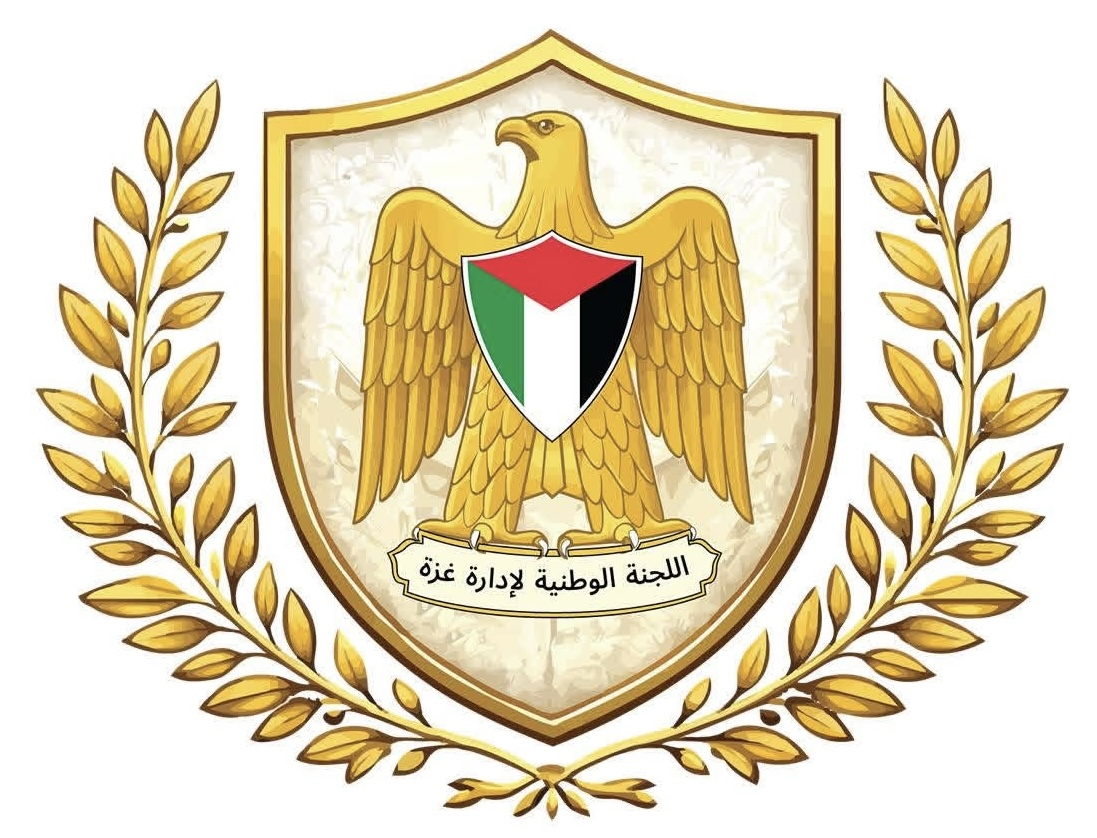
- Logo

Overview
- Established: 16 January 2026
- Country: Palestine
- Polity: Gaza Strip (under UNSC Resolution 2803)
- Leader: Chief Commissioner
- Leader Name: Ali Shaath
- Appointed by: Palestinian factions: Fatah; Hamas; PIJ; Other factions
- Responsible to: Board of Peace
- Headquarters: Cairo, Egypt (temporarily)
- Website: https://www.ncag.ps/en

The National Committee for the Administration of Gaza (NCAG; Arabic: اللجنة الوطنية لإدارة غزة or commonly called the Technocratic Committee is a transitional body mandated by the United Nations to manage day-to-day operations of the civil service and administration in the Gaza Strip in the aftermath of the Gaza war and its related peace plan. It is intended to succeed the current Hamas administration in Gaza. The NCAG is composed of independent Palestinian technocrats and is supervised by the Board of Peace.

With members of the NCAG elected and agreed upon by the Palestinian factions, and vetted by Israel, the committee itself formally began work in Egypt on 16 January 2026, with Ali Shaath as chief commissioner. However, the NCAG's assumption of de facto governance in Gaza has been delayed, with Israel blocking committee members from entering the territory, and initial plans for a speedy transition of power falling through.

In July 2026, Hamas announced the dissolution of the Government Emergency Committee, saying the move was intended to allow the NCAG to assume administration of Gaza.

== Background ==
The Gaza war began in October 2023 following a series of coordinated armed attacks carried out by Hamas and several other Palestinian militant groups in southern Israel on 7 October 2023. United States president Donald Trump proposed a 20-point peace plan in late September 2025, which was accepted by both Hamas and the Israeli government, resulting in a ceasefire coming into force in the Gaza Strip on 10 October 2025.

The idea of the NCAG itself originates from an earlier proposal of a "Community Support Committee" under the auspices of the Palestinian Authority (PA); this plan had been agreed on by the Palestinian factions during intra-Palestinian talks in October 2024.

== Formation ==
=== Negotiations and selection process ===
The Gaza peace plan, unveiled by Donald Trump on 29 September 2025, proposed that "Gaza will be governed under the temporary transitional governance of a technocratic, apolitical Palestinian committee, responsible for delivering the day-to-day running of public services and municipalities for the people in Gaza".

On 14 October, Egyptian foreign minister Badr Abdelatty stated that fifteen Palestinian technocrats had been chosen to lead a post-war interim administration for the Gaza Strip. He added that the list had been agreed on by all Palestinian factions, including Hamas, and had been vetted by Israel.

On 24 October, Hamas announced it was willing to hand "over the administration of the Gaza Strip to a temporary Palestinian committee composed of independent technocrats, which will manage the affairs of life and basic services in cooperation with Arab brothers and international institutions".

On 8 November, Vice President of the PA, Hussein al-Sheikh, stated that the PA and Hamas had agreed that any future Palestinian technical government for the Gaza Strip would be led by a minister suggested by the PA with health minister and former mayor of Gaza City, Maged Abu Ramadan, being named as a possible candidate.

The formation of the committee was authorised by United Nations Security Council Resolution 2803 on 17 November. The resolution also made it clear that the technocrats were to be from Gaza only and not from the West Bank.

On 23 November, it was reported that the PA and Hamas had jointly agreed a shortlist of 40 potential members for the Palestinian Committee and need to agree on fifteen members to suggest for the committee from that list.

=== Launch and delayed entry into Gaza ===
The membership of the committee was announced on 14 January 2026 with Ali Shaath as chair. The establishment of the committee was welcomed by the majority of Palestinian factions, including Hamas, as well as the PA and the governments of Egypt, Qatar and Turkey. It held its inaugural meeting in Cairo, Egypt, on 16 January.

In its founding statement, chairman Ali Shaath stated that the committee would focus on establishing security in the Gaza Strip and restoring infrastructure destroyed during the war, including electricity, water, healthcare, and education.

On 20 January, it was reported that Israel had blocked the committee members from entering Gaza, for unclear reasons. Egypt and the United States were reportedly working to try and facilitate its entry. After the Rafah Crossing reopened on 2 February 2026, it was reported that members of the committee plan to enter the Gaza Strip once a suitable headquarters building can be prepared.

On 9 February, an unnamed Arab diplomat told The Times of Israel that there was no longer any timeline for the NCAG's entry into Gaza, due to the committee not being "equipped to govern" and the lack of an "appropriate environment" in the territory. Haaretz, citing unnamed "Palestinian and Arab officials", claimed that both the PA and Hamas, despite their public support for the NCAG, are seeking to obstruct its work for their own interests; and that furthermore, the technocrats fear they will be targeted by local armed groups such as the Israeli-backed Popular Forces.

In a statement published on 26 March, the Democratic Front for the Liberation of Palestine (DFLP) said that the NCAG had been functionally rendered "a government-in-exile" by Israel.

On 6 July, Hamas announced the dissolution of the Government Emergency Committee, saying the move was intended to allow the NCAG to assume administration of Gaza. The UN secretary-general’s spokesperson Stéphane Dujarric conditionally welcomed the move, saying it should contribute to ceasefire implementation, civilian protection and unhindered humanitarian aid. Belgian Foreign Minister Maxime Prévot said he had instructed his cabinet to move toward a decision on recognizing Palestinian statehood following Hamas's announcement; Hamas stepping away from Gaza governance had been one of Prévot’s stated conditions for recognition. Israeli Foreign Minister Gideon Sa'ar dismissed the announcement as a "trick" intended to avoid disarmament, saying that "as long as Hamas retains its weapons, any civilian government will of course operate as Hamas dictates".

On July 26, the Israeli government approved the beginning of the council's work in the Gaza Strip, but no date was given for its actual entry into the strip.

== Members ==
The committee's members were selected and agreed upon by the Palestinian factions, including both Hamas and Fatah, and were vetted by Israel. Despite some past political affiliations, including Shaath's previous ties to Fatah, all members are currently independents and the committee is being formally presented as nonpartisan.

As of 16 January 2026, the membership of the committee was as follows:

Portfolio	Incumbent	Period
Chief Commissioner	Ali Shaath	2026–present
Acting Energy & Transport	Ali Shaath	2026–present
Agriculture	Abdul Karim Ashour	2026–present
Education	Jaber Al-Daour	2026–present
Finance	Bashir Al-Rais Ali Barhoum	2026–present
Health	Ayed Yaghi	2026–present
Land and Housing	Osama Al Saadawi	2026–present
Interior	Sami Nasman	2026–present
Justice	Adnan Abu Warda	2026–present
Land Authority	Arabi Abu Shaaban	2026–present
Municipal Affairs and Water	Ali Barhoum	2026–present
Social and Women's Affairs	Hana Tarazi	2026–present
Religious Affairs	Rami Halas	2026–present
Communications and Digital Services	Omar Shamali	2026–present
Economy, Industry, and Trade	Ayed Awni Abu-Ramadan	2026–present
Tribal Affairs	Husni Al-Mughni	2026–present

== Aims, powers, and limitations ==
Shaath released a mission statement on 18 January 2026, which says that the committee will focus on establishing security control, restoring basic services, maintaining peace, and fixing the economy.

However, in practice the committee's powers are limited to civilian affairs, and Hamas would therefore continue to retain de facto security control over Gaza. The militant group recently enhanced its presence on its side of the Yellow Line to show that it alone can help the committee and maintain security. However, the Board of Peace, which is supposed to supervise the committee, includes staunchly pro-Israel figures and wants to disarm Hamas. Following a 26 January meeting between Shaath and BoP member Tony Blair, it was clarified that the NCAG would have no role in the disarmament of armed groups. A Gazan source described the situation in this way: "Shaath may have the key to the car... but it is a Hamas car".

The committee has no political powers to represent Gazans or establish international relations. It exists outside the framework of the Palestinian Authority, which grants all official documents to Gazans and manages education, health, relief, and other sectors there to varying degrees.

== Symbols ==
At the signing ceremony for the committee's mission statement, the Palestinian flag was displayed. The committee had used a range of different logo prototypes on its social media profiles, many of which featured a rising phoenix. A new prototype appeared on 2 February 2026, which was similar to the coat of arms used by the Palestinian Authority, featuring an escutcheon in the form of the Palestinian flag supported by the Eagle of Saladin. However, in the committee's emblem, the eagle holds a scroll with the English language abbreviation "NCAG", while in the coat of arms of the PA, the scroll reads "Palestinian Authority" in Arabic. The Eagle of Saladin also features in the coats of arms of Egypt and Iraq. The choice of design was criticized by Israeli prime minister Benjamin Netanyahu. In response to criticism, the committee stated that it is still testing a range of visual concepts. The final version of the logo was unveiled on 19 February 2026 and features an escutcheon in the form of the Palestinian flag supported by the Eagle of Saladin holding a scroll with the full name of the committee in Arabic, surrounded by olive branches.

== See also ==
- Cabinet of Palestine
- Gaza Strip under Resolution 2803
