= Board of Peace =

International organization led by Donald Trump

- Logo

- States that have accepted invitations to participate on the Board of Peace
- Headquarters: United States Institute of Peace Headquarters, Washington, D.C.
- Official languages: English
- Type: International organization
- Members: 27 member states: Albania; Argentina; Armenia; Azerbaijan; Bahrain; Bulgaria; Cambodia; Egypt; El Salvador; Hungary; Indonesia; Israel; Jordan; Kazakhstan; Kosovo; Kuwait; Mongolia; Morocco; Pakistan; Paraguay; Qatar; Saudi Arabia; Turkey; United Arab Emirates; United States; Uzbekistan; Vietnam

Leaders
  - Chairman-for-life: Donald Trump
  - Special Advisor(s): Josh Gruenbaum; Aryeh Lightstone

Establishment
  - Announced: 29 September 2025
  - Mandated: 17 November 2025
  - Charter signed: 22 January 2026
- Website boardofpeace.org

The Board of Peace (BoP), or the Peace Board, is an international organization with the stated purpose of promoting peacebuilding around the world. Established by United States President Donald Trump and led by the government of the United States, the board is named in United Nations Security Council Resolution 2803 as a body tasked with overseeing the processes of the Gaza peace plan. The Board of Peace was proposed in September 2025 and formally established on the side-lines of the 56th World Economic Forum in January 2026.

Resolution 2803 welcomed the board to aid with reconstruction efforts in the Gaza Strip, via the National Committee for the Administration of Gaza (NCAG), and authorized it to deploy a temporary peacekeeping force. Participating countries are required to contribute US$1 billion to the organization to renew membership after the first three years. As of 2026, 25 of the 62 invited countries have signed the board's charter. The board's launch failed to attract enthusiasm from most world leaders, and it did not gain support from a number of Western countries.

Several policy analysts and officials have expressed concerns about the board's governance model, raising concerns over the decision-making authority concentrated in its chair, Donald Trump, who has indicated he intends to remain chairman for life. European nations have expressed concern over the board usurping the role of the United Nations (UN) and exceeding its stated purpose to aid the Gaza Strip. Trump has stated that the BoP could potentially replace the UN, while also expressing continued support for the latter, and has defended the BoP's reputation, describing it as "the most prestigious Board ever assembled, at any time, any place". By May 2026, the BoP had no funds in its official World Bank account, despite $17 billion in pledges by member states. Donations have gone into a J. P. Morgan account with no oversight.

== Background ==
Following the destruction of the Gaza Strip during the Gaza war, former British Prime Minister Tony Blair initially proposed placing the Strip under international administration in August 2025. United States President Donald Trump presented a similar plan in late September 2025 which was partially accepted by both the Israeli government and Hamas the following month.

The United Nations Security Council adopted United Nations Security Council Resolution 2803 on 17 November 2025 welcoming the establishment of the BoP. Resolution 2803 authorized the board to deploy an International Stabilization Force to the Gaza Strip. The US Congress played no role in authorizing the project, and it was described by an MS NOW opinion writer as the latest in a series of attempted power grabs by Trump. Following the entry into force of the Gaza peace agreement two days earlier, Blair met Hussein al-Sheikh (the Vice President of Palestine) on 12 October 2025 in Jordan to discuss the reconstruction in the Gaza Strip. That evening, Trump declared "the war is over" and that the BoP would be formed quickly.

== History ==
In early January 2026, it was reported that Nikolay Mladenov (former United Nations Special Coordinator for the Middle East Peace Process) had been chosen to serve as BoP director-general. Mladenov subsequently held meetings with al-Sheikh and Israeli Prime Minister Benjamin Netanyahu. On 11 January 2026, it was reported that Trump was expected to announce within the week the individuals whom he would appoint to the BoP. In response, Hamas spokesperson Hazem Kassem called for the expedited establishment of the NCAG.

With the commencement of the second phase of the Gaza Peace Agreement on 14 January 2026, it was reported that the United States had sent invitations to several countries to join the board and that it would have its first meeting on the side-lines of the World Economic Forum summit the following week. Trump announced the formation of the board on 15 January 2026 via a post on Truth Social, which said, "It is my Great Honor to announce that THE BOARD OF PEACE has been formed. The Members of the Board will be announced shortly, but I can say with certainty that it is the Greatest and Most Prestigious Board ever assembled at any time, any place."

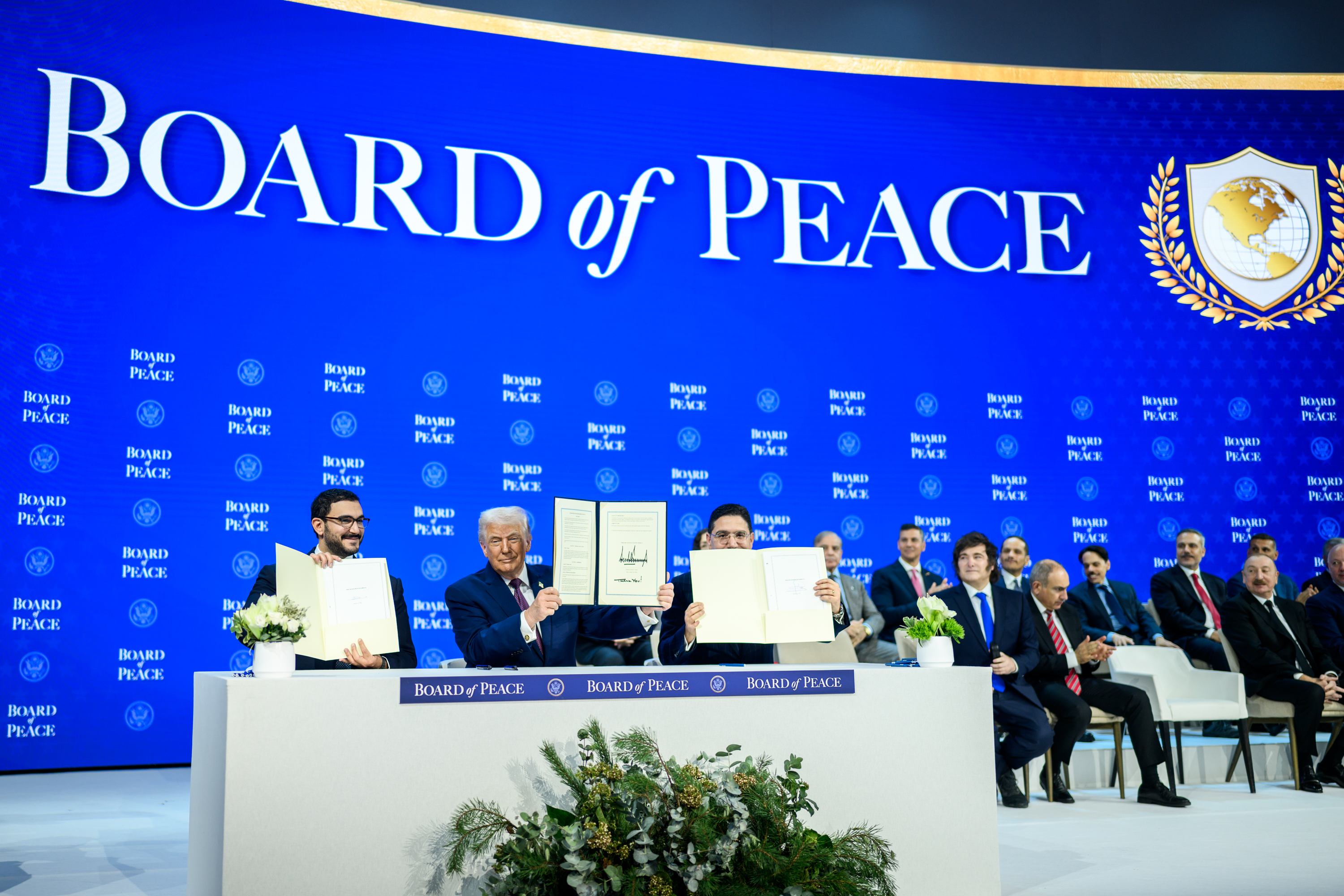
Chairman President Donald Trump attends the BoP Charter announcement and signing ceremony at the World Economic Forum, 22 January 2026

On 17 January 2026, Argentine president Javier Milei and Argentine ambassador to the United States Alec Oxenford announced that Trump had formally invited Argentina to join the Board and become a founding member. Milei posted on X (formerly Twitter) that he thanked Trump for the invitation, calling it an "honor" and reaffirming that Argentina "stand[s] with the countries" that "confront terrorism head-on" and "defend life and property".

Turkish President Recep Tayyip Erdoğan and Canadian Prime Minister Mark Carney were also invited by Trump, with Carney confirming his participation. Albanian Prime Minister Edi Rama posted on Facebook that Albania had been personally invited to join the Board and become a founding member, describing it as major international recognition and a sign of the country's growing international standing.

On 20 January 2026, President Trump referenced the "Board of Peace", citing that "the United Nations never helped [him]" as a reason for its existence and claiming that it "might" replace the UN. On 22 January 2026, Trump hosted a signing ceremony for the founding charter of the BoP on the side-lines of the 56th World Economic Forum in Davos. Leaders and foreign ministers of 19 countries, in addition to the United States, attended the BoP signing ceremony in Davos and signed the founding charter.

Israeli Prime Minister Benjamin Netanyahu chose not to attend the ceremony, citing his concern over arrest by Swiss authorities, which had stated that they were "obliged to cooperate" with the International Criminal Court arrest warrant regarding his alleged war crimes. On 7 February, it was reported that the first session of the Board of Peace was scheduled for 19 February, and will deal with dismantling Hamas military infrastructures.

During the 19 February 2026 summit, Albania, Indonesia, Kazakhstan, Kosovo, and Morocco pledged to send troops for an International Stabilization Force consisting of 20,000 soldiers, while Egypt and Jordan agreed to train the police, which are expected to number 12,000. Furthermore, the United States pledged $10 billion for the board's efforts while nine other member states (Note: Azerbaijan, Bahrain, Kazakhstan, Kuwait, Morocco, Qatar, Saudi Arabia, United Arab Emirates, and Uzbekistan) pledged another $7 billion.

Amid escalating Middle East tensions, Indonesia paused its engagement with the Board of Peace, as domestic calls for withdrawal intensified following the US–Israel attacks on Iran.

On 15 May, the Board of Peace issued its first progress report to the UN Security Council. The report's main conclusion was that the lack of progress was due to Hamas' unwillingness to disarm.

On 27 June 2026 The Guardian released a story about a draft resolution of the Board of Peace, which Omar Shakir of DAWN said could potentially lead to them having complete immunity from any prosecution for crimes in Gaza and enable to seize any land or property for their own use without recompense. This he said would "Far from signaling an end to genocide, apartheid and occupation, this document suggests entrenching some of its ugliest signature characteristics. This risks not only complicity, but direct perpetration of grave abuses."

On 30 June 2026, the Board of Peace was reported to have scheduled a pilot scheme of moving Gaza civilians into humanitarian zones protected by a multilateral force. The aim is to leave Hamas with "no people, no land, and no resources". Ahmed al-Tanani of the Arab Center for Research and Policy Studies said that Hamas is demanding the mediators to provide real guarantees to prevent humanitarian projects turning into a "cover for genocide."

== Structure ==
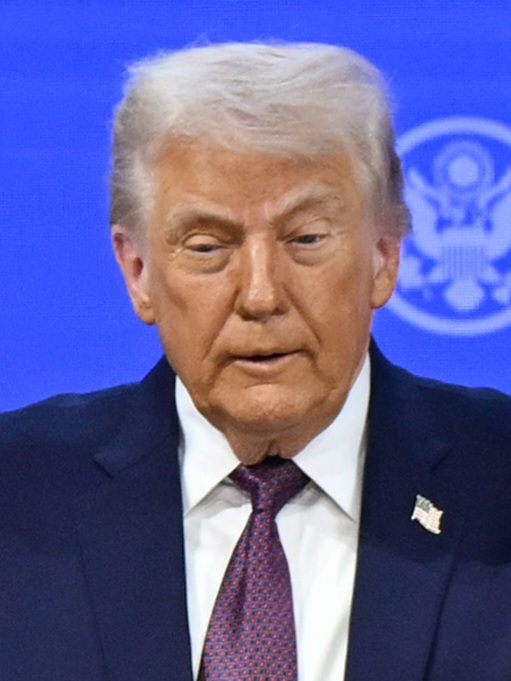
Chairman-for-life President Donald Trump (pictured at the BoP Charter signing ceremony)

The charter of the Board of Peace outlines a multi-level structure for the organization, which includes:

- Donald Trump, designated as chairman for life.
- The board proper, mainly comprising national leaders. About sixty were invited by Trump.
- The Board of Peace Executive Board, with a focus on diplomacy and investment. Seven members were appointed by Trump.
- The Gaza Executive Board, to direct the NCAG. Its head, Nikolay Mladenov, who was appointed to the board alongside ten others, is titled the High Representative for Gaza.

=== Chairman ===
Trump is explicitly named in the BoP's charter as its chairman. He is not subject to term limits and holds the sole authority to nominate his designated successor. According to the charter, as the chairman, he is exclusively authorized to invite countries to join the BoP. In that capacity, he also has the exclusive authority to create, modify, or dissolve subsidiary entities of the board. All revisions to the charter, as well as administrative directives issued by the BoP, are subject to his approval. Trump's chairmanship is independent of his presidency of the United States, and he has indicated that he wants to remain chairman for life.

=== Board of Peace Executive Board ===
The members of the Board of Peace Executive Board were announced on 17 January 2026. They are:

- Nikolay Mladenov – High Representative for Gaza, former United Nations Special Coordinator for the Middle East Peace Process
- Marco Rubio – United States Secretary of State
- Steve Witkoff – United States Special Envoy to the Middle East
- Jared Kushner – Donald Trump's son-in-law
- Tony Blair – Former Prime Minister of the United Kingdom
- Marc Rowan – CEO of Apollo Global Management
- Ajay Banga – President of the World Bank Group
- Robert Gabriel Jr. – American political advisor

=== Gaza Executive Board ===
A Gaza Executive Board supports the High Representative for Gaza and the NCAG. Its members, also announced on 17 January 2026, are:

- Steve Witkoff – United States Special Envoy to the Middle East
- Jared Kushner – Donald Trump's son-in-law
- Hakan Fidan – Minister of Foreign Affairs of Turkey
- Ali al-Thawadi – Minister for Strategic Affairs of Qatar
- Hassan Rashad – Director of the General Intelligence Service of Egypt
- Tony Blair – Former Prime Minister of the United Kingdom
- Marc Rowan – CEO of Apollo Global Management
- Reem Al Hashimy – Minister of State for International Cooperation of the United Arab Emirates
- Nikolay Mladenov – High Representative for Gaza
- Yakir Gabay – Israeli businessman
- Sigrid Kaag – United Nations Special Coordinator for the Middle East Peace Process

=== Funding ===
By May 2026, the BoP had no funds in its official World Bank account, despite $17 billion in pledges by member states. Donations have gone into a J.P. Morgan account which is not obligated to report its financial position to contributors and board members. $20 million contributed by Morocco were used to fund the office of Nickolay Mladenov and salaries for the committee the BoP formed to govern Gaza. $100 million donated by the United Arab Emirates for the training of a Gaza police force were frozen, and the program was on hold.

== Membership status ==
Around 60 countries received invitations from Trump to join the BoP as founding members. No countries from Sub-Saharan Africa received invitations. Countries wishing to be permanent members of the BoP must pay US$1 billion into a fund controlled by Trump; otherwise, each country serves a three-year term which may be renewed at his discretion.

=== Members ===
The following states signed the charter of the BoP. All except Albania, Cambodia, Egypt, El Salvador, Israel, Kuwait and Vietnam signed it at the inaugural meeting on January 22, 2026, and became founding members.

- Albania
- Argentina
- Armenia
- Azerbaijan
- Bahrain
- Bulgaria
- Cambodia
- Egypt
- El Salvador
- Hungary
- Indonesia
- Israel
- Jordan
- Kazakhstan
- Kosovo
- Kuwait
- Mongolia
- Morocco
- Pakistan
- Paraguay
- Qatar
- Saudi Arabia
- Turkey
- United Arab Emirates
- United States
- Uzbekistan
- Vietnam

Belarus intended to accept the invitation but their delegation did not receive U.S. visas to attend the inaugural meeting and is therefore not a member:

- Belarus

=== Other invitees ===
==== Observers at the February 19, 2026, meeting ====
The following states and the European Union attended the first meeting of the Board of Peace as observers.

- Austria
- Croatia
- Cyprus
- Czech Republic
- Finland
- Germany
- Greece
- India
- Italy
- Japan
- Mexico
- Netherlands
- Norway
- Oman
- Poland
- Romania
- Slovakia
- South Korea
- Switzerland
- Thailand
- United Kingdom

==== Invitees who did not participate at the January inaugural meeting ====
The following states were invited but did not respond or participate as observers:

- Australia
- Brazil
- China
- Philippines
- Portugal
- Russia
- Singapore

The following state received an invitation that was subsequently rescinded:

- Canada (Note: Prime Minister Mark Carney agreed in principle to join the board, but ruled out paying for permanent membership. On 22 January 2026, Trump withdrew the invitation without giving a reason.)

The following states declined Trump's invitation to participate:

- France
- Ireland
- New Zealand
- Slovenia
- Spain
- Sweden
- Vatican City
- Ukraine

=== Countries, other entities that have declined to join ===
Leaders of Brazil, Mexico, the United Kingdom, France, Germany, Norway, Sweden, and the European Union said they will not join the board; the Vatican also declined to join, saying that "efforts to handle crisis situations should be managed by the United Nations".

== Meetings ==
=== List of meetings ===
Meetings of the Board of Peace
| Date | Location | Chair | Notes |
|---|---|---|---|
| 22 January 2026 | Davos, Switzerland | Chairman President Donald Trump | The charter establishing the board was signed by Trump and 25 other leaders. The plan included provisions for the construction of 100,000 housing units in Rafah as well as a "New Gaza," and stressed the importance of security and the demilitarization of Hamas. |
| 19 February 2026 | Washington, D.C., United States | Chairman President Donald Trump | The United States pledged $10 billion for the board's efforts, while nine member states (Note: Azerbaijan, Bahrain, Kazakhstan, Kuwait, Morocco, Qatar, Saudi Arabia, United Arab Emirates, and Uzbekistan) agreed to contribute $7 billion. The armed forces to be deployed in Gaza, starting with Rafah, will consist of 12,000 police and 20,000 ISF soldiers drawn from Albania, Indonesia, Kazakhstan, Kosovo, and Morocco, while Egypt and Jordan will train the police. Trump blamed solely Hamas for Gaza's destruction and threatened Iran amid the U.S. military buildup in the Middle East. FIFA pledged $50 million for a football stadium in the Gaza Strip, along with money for a FIFA academy and 55 football fields. |
| 24 September 2026 | New York City, United States | Chairman President Donald Trump | The Board of Peace announced a $2.45bn Gaza recovery plan to be spread across 66 programmes over six months, and directed at housing, diesel generation and waste removal, among other needs. |

== Headquarters ==
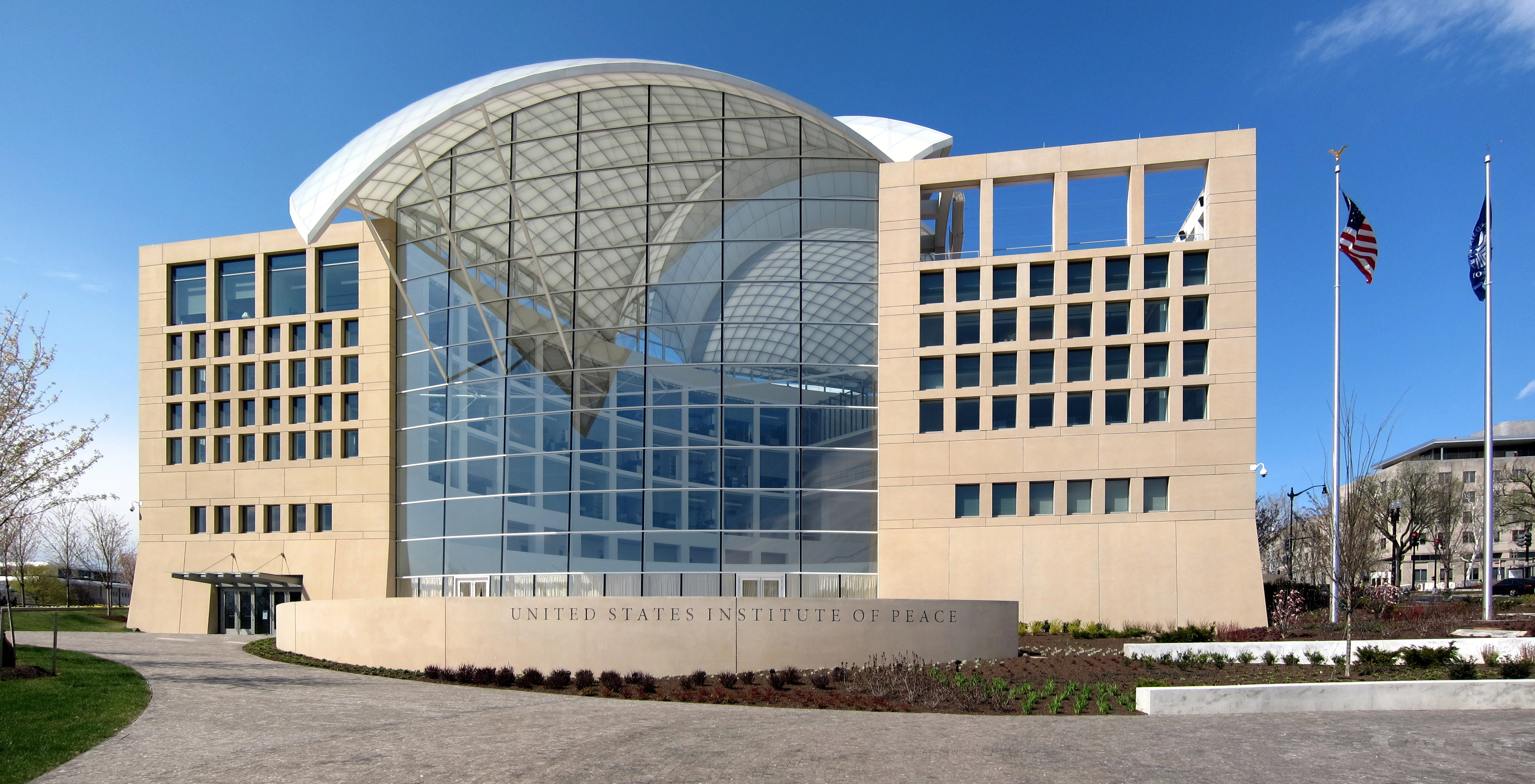
The headquarters of the United States Institute of Peace, where the board is seated

According to the BoP's charter, the Government of the United States serves as its official depository. In late January 2026, Trump designated the headquarters of the United States Institute of Peace, which he had taken over and renamed the "Donald J. Trump Institute of Peace", in Washington D.C. as the seat of the board. The institute's name and legal status were provisionally as dictated by the US government, pending an appeal it had filed against a federal judge's decision that the takeover was illegal.

== Symbols ==
The charter of the BoP states that it shall have an official seal approved by its chairman. A logo, used at the inaugural meeting on 22 January 2026, features a globe showing most of the United States along with Canada and Mexico, the northern portions of South America, and a small portion of Africa, while omitting Europe, Asia, and Oceania entirely. The globe is superimposed on a shield flanked by olive branches, all rendered in a gold color scheme. Them logo is displayed on a white field when a flag is needed to represent the organization.

Unlike the United Nations' emblem, which uses an azimuthal equidistant projection centered on the North Pole to avoid privileging any single landmass, the Board of Peace emblem places North America—and specifically the contiguous United States—at the visual apex of the globe. Critics and observers have characterized this orientation as an explicitly Americentric departure from traditional internationalist iconography. It includes Trumpian territorial demands: Venezuela, Canada and Greenland.

The design of the BoP logo has been widely mocked on social media. As an allegedly AI-generated derivative work of the Emblem of the United Nations, it has been described as "AI slop". A senior policy fellow at the European Council on Foreign Relations has described the logo as a "US-first western hemisphere flanked by rip-off UN olive branches burnished in Trumpian gold".

== Reception ==
The board has failed to attract enthusiasm from most world leaders. It did not gain support from a number of Western countries, notably the United Kingdom, France and Norway, with Keir Starmer calling Vladimir Putin's role "concerning". Some European Union ambassadors reportedly raised "serious doubts" and said that they would examine the legal framework before taking a position.

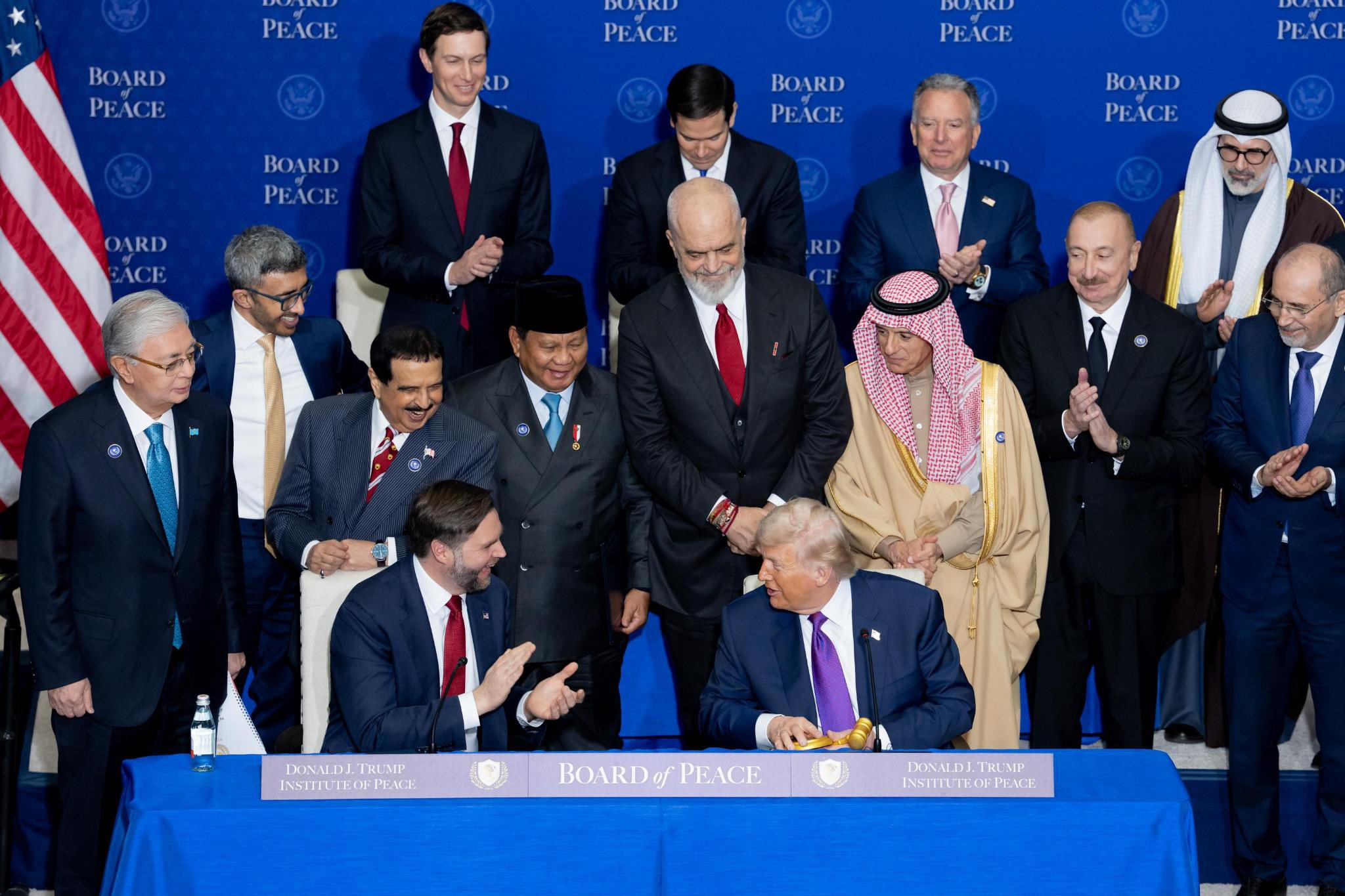
Trump, Indonesian President Prabowo Subianto, Azerbaijani President Ilham Aliyev, and other leaders at the Board of Peace meeting, 20 February 2026

France voiced concern that it seeks to usurp the role of the United Nations. In response to France stating its intention to "not answer favourably" to Trump's invitation to join his "BoP", Trump threatened 200 percent tariffs on French wine and champagne. He also remarked of Emmanuel Macron, "Nobody wants him because he's going to be out of office very soon."

A Canadian government source expressed to the media that Canada would not pay for a seat on Trump's proposed board of peace, adding that Prime Minister Mark Carney intended to accept the invitation but not under the terms outlined by Trump. Finance Minister François-Philippe Champagne later publicly confirmed that the federal government would not pay the "$1 billion US price tag". However, Trump rescinded Canada's invitation days after Carney delivered a speech at Davos warning of an "era of great power rivalry" and arguing that the US-led world order had ended. Canadians for Justice and Peace in the Middle East said that Carney's participation would have conferred "undeserved legitimacy" on the board, adding that Canadians expected clear opposition to what it described as "Trump's power grab".

Similarly, Brazil, under President Luiz Inácio Lula da Silva, viewed the proposal with caution, expressing concern that it could concentrate excessive power in the US presidency and overshadow the role of the UN.

Norway too declined to join; its state secretary, Kristoffer Thoner, said the proposal "raises a number of questions that require further dialogue with the United States". Sweden did not issue a formal response but PM Ulf Kristersson reportedly stated on the sidelines of the 2026 World Economic Forum that the country would not sign up to the board over its textual content. Slovenia's PM Robert Golob declined the invitation because the body "dangerously interferes with the broader international order".

Portuguese foreign minister Paulo Rangel declared that the Portuguese government was awaiting clarification from the Trump Administration, expressing doubts as "the way the charter is written is somewhat ambiguous as to whether it could have a scope other than just [Gaza]", while saying that the signing of international treaties "may involve internal procedures that are not compatible with just saying yes overnight". Italian Prime Minister Giorgia Meloni said that participation in such a board would be incompatible with the country's constitution. Volodymyr Zelenskyy expressed difficulty for Ukraine to join a board alongside Russia. UK Foreign Secretary Yvette Cooper cited similar reason.

German officials described the board as a "counter-draft" to the UN and were surprised that it proposed a permanent international organization to address global conflicts instead of focusing solely on a Gaza ceasefire. The board has been described as a vanity project by the Sydney Morning Herald and "a fledgling club of autocrats" by the Financial Times.

The Guardian called it "a Trump-dominated pay-to-play club: a global version of his Mar-a-Lago court aimed at supplanting the UN itself", arguing that the body ultimately outlined bore little resemblance to what the United Nations Security Council believed it was endorsing. According to The Guardian, a charter circulated to national capitals two months after the resolution's adoption made no reference to Gaza, instead presenting the BoP as a permanent global institution. The article noted that most of the document focused on internal rules granting sweeping authority to the chairman—Donald Trump, the only individual named—including the exclusive power to appoint and dismiss members, set agendas, and issue resolutions, while other members could obtain permanent status only by paying a US$1 billion fee, still leaving effective control concentrated in Trump's hands. Bloomberg described this as Trump holding the board's "ultimate decision-making power". Sania Faisal El-Husseini, a professor of international relations at the Arab-American University in Palestine, noted that the organization "is not an international body with legal personality".

Indonesian participation in the BoP was met with several protests at home. Former Vice Minister of Foreign Affairs Dino Patti Djalal raised his skepticism on BoP's efforts to enforce peace with Palestine citing the lack of participation from Palestine and Trump's megalomaniacal attitude while recommending Prabowo Subianto to keep an option for Indonesia to leave whenever the BoP violates Indonesia's free and active foreign policy. Djalal protested the planned deposit of US$1 billion as "nonsense" because it was far larger than Indonesia's funding to ASEAN. Indonesian Ulama Council urged Prabowo to reconsider Indonesia's participation in the BoP and criticize the BoP as a neocolonial project in favor of Israel. After Prabowo summoned all foreign ministers and vice ministers, Islamic organizations and think tanks to clarify Indonesia's position, Djalal changed his opinion stating that BoP is the only "realistic" option while advising caution. Former minister Hassan Wirajuda states that despite the worries that Trump may play a very unpredictable move, Wirajuda hoped that Indonesia along with the other Muslim majority countries inside the BoP can act as a counterbalance to Trump. Foreign Affairs Minister Sugiono admits that Prabowo's decision to join the BoP will generate controversies, but these will diminish if everyone considers different perspectives. Former Governor of Jakarta Anies Baswedan criticize Indonesia's participation as violating Indonesia's foreign policy principles and urged the government to leave the organization after Israel and United States attacked Iran.

Elon Musk questioned the BoP during remarks at the World Economic Forum, joking about the homophony of "peace" and "piece" while referring to "a little piece of Greenland, a little piece of Venezuela", before adding that "all we want is peace". Mary Robinson, a former chair of The Elders, described the board as a "delusion of power" and said that its charter did not mention a UN mandate nor contain the word "Gaza", which had been the original mandate approved by the UN.

At the 2026 Munich Security Conference, EU High Representative Kaja Kallas said that the Board of Peace does not reflect the UN security council resolution, which "provided for a Board of Peace for Gaza, but it also provided for it to be limited in time until 2027, it provided for the Palestinians to have a say, and it referred to Gaza, whereas the statute of the Board of Peace makes no reference to any of these things".

== See also ==
- 2025 Donald Trump Gaza Strip takeover proposal
- Gaza Strip under Resolution 2803
- Israeli–Palestinian peace process
- National Committee for the Administration of Gaza
- Shield of the Americas, another organization founded and chaired by Donald Trump
