= Gaza Strip under Resolution 2803 =

Gaza Strip قطاع غزة (Qita' Ghazzah)
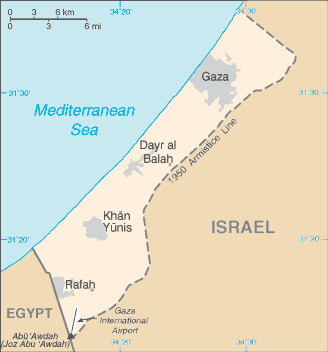
- The Gaza Strip
- Country: Palestine
- Gaza peace plan: 10 October 2025
- Resolution 2803: 17 November 2025
- Administration established (Note: Board of Peace established on the 15 January and the National Committee for the Administration of Gaza (government body) established on the 16 January, while Ali Shaath already became Chief Commissioner on 14 January.): 14–16 January 2026
- Administrative centre: Cairo, Egypt (temporarily)

Government
  - Type: United Nations–mandated transitional administration
  - Chairman of the Board of Peace: Donald Trump
  - Chief Commissioner: Dr. Ali Shaath

Area
  - Total: 356 km^{2} (137 sq mi)

Population
  - Total: 2,050,000

Resolution 2803 adopted by the United Nations Security Council on 17 November 2025 contains provisions for the transitional governance of the Gaza Strip in the aftermath of the Gaza war. The resolution, incorporating the Gaza peace plan, authorises an international body, known as the Board of Peace, to support the administration of the Gaza Strip, empowers the board to appoint a Palestinian National Committee for the Administration of Gaza to manage day-to day governance, and allows for the deployment of an International Stabilization Force (ISF) into the territory.

The administration is modelled on earlier United Nations mandated transitional authorities such as those in West New Guinea (UNTEA), Cambodia (UNTAC), Eastern Slavonia (UNTAES), Kosovo (UNMIK) and East Timor (UNTAET).

The Palestinian Authority welcomed the adoption of Resolution 2803 and has said it is ready to support its implementation.

== History ==
The Gaza strip had been part of the Ottoman Empire since the 16th century and came under the British Mandate of Palestine in 1920. Following the 1948 Arab–Israeli War the territory came under the control of All-Palestine Protectorate before becoming occupied by Israeli forces during the 1967 Six-Day War. The Gaza Strip came under the administration of the Palestinian Authority in 1994 as part of the Oslo Accords and was administered by Hamas forces after they seized control in 2007.

The Gaza war began in October 2023 following a series of coordinated armed attacks carried out by Hamas and several other Palestinian militant groups in southern Israel on 7 October 2023.

=== Initial proposal ===
Former British prime minister Tony Blair, through his think tank the Tony Blair Institute for Global Change, began developing a post-war plan for the Gaza Strip in July 2025 and discussed the idea with US president Donald Trump and his adviser Jared Kushner at a meeting at the White House on 27 August 2025.

=== Gaza peace plan ===
US president Donald Trump shared a draft 20-point peace plan with Arab and Muslim majority countries on the sidelines of the 80th session of the United Nations General Assembly in September 2025. Article 9 of the Trump deal incorporated Blair's proposals for a local executive committee overseen by an international board, the Board of Peace, and Article 15 describes plans for a multinational peacekeeping force and locally recruited civilian police service.

Trump presented a final version of his plan at a press conference with Israeli Prime Minister Benjamin Netanyahu at the White House on 29 September 2025. The Palestinian Authority welcomed the proposal affirming their commitment to a "modern, democratic, and non-militarized Palestinian state". Hamas later announced that they would be willing to release all Israeli hostages, to hand over the administration of the Gaza Strip to an independent body of Palestinian technocrats and expressed a willingness to negotiate on Trump's proposed plan. Indirect negotiations between Israel and Hamas started in Sharm el Sheikh, Egypt on 6 October.

=== October 2025 Gaza ceasefire ===
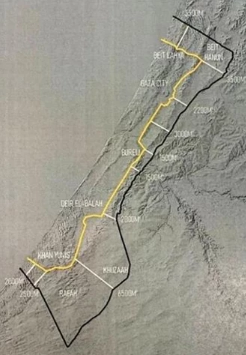
The boundary between Israeli- and Hamas-controlled areas is shown in yellow.

On the evening of 8 October 2025, Trump announced that an agreement had been reached on the first phase of the Gaza agreement, which would lead to the cessation of hostilities, the release of Israeli hostages, the release of some Palestinian prisoners, the partial withdrawal of Israeli forces to a predetermined Yellow Line, and the entry of humanitarian aid into the Gaza Strip. The first phase of the agreement was signed by both parties the following day and came into effect on 10 October 2025 with the cessation of hostilities.

=== Security Council Resolution 2803 ===
A draft United Nations Security Council resolution was circulated by the United States on 3 November 2025 which would give a two year mandate to the International Security Force and set up the Board of Peace. The draft underwent two further revisions before being adopted as United Nations Security Council Resolution 2803 on 17 November 2025.

=== Hamas opposition ===
Hamas, which at the time that the resolution passed controlled slightly under half of the Gaza Strip (Hamas controlled the region between the Yellow Line and the Mediterranean Sea) as stipulated by the Gaza peace plan, came out in opposition of Resolution 2803, stating it “imposes an international guardianship mechanism". Continued Hamas control in Gaza is a significant obstacle to a de facto establishment of an international administration, with many countries reportedly fearing that their troops will end up having to fight Hamas forces. However, Article 17 of the Gaza peace plan allows for its implementation in areas outside of Hamas control in the event of Hamas delaying or rejecting the plan.

== Administration ==
=== Board of Peace ===
A body known as the Board of Peace has been authorised by Resolution 2803 to support with the administration, reconstruction and economic recovery of the Gaza Strip. United States president Donald Trump has named himself as its chairman. The formal establishment of the board was announced on 15 January 2026 by US president Donald Trump. The Gaza Executive Board and High Representative for Gaza supports the work of the National Committee for the Administration of Gaza was on behalf of the wider Board of Peace.

=== National Committee for the Administration of Gaza ===
Resolution 2803 empowers the Board of Peace to supervise and support a "Palestinian technocratic, apolitical committee of competent Palestinians from the [Gaza] Strip, which shall be responsible for day-to-day operations of Gaza's civil service and administration". The committee, formally known as the National Committee for the Administration of Gaza, met for the first time on 16 January 2026 with Ali Shaath as its chair.

=== Local government ===
The Gaza Strip is divided into five governorates; Gaza, Khan Yunis, North Gaza, Deir al-Balah and Rafah which are further divided into 25 municipalities. The Gaza peace plan states that the National Committee for the Administration of Gaza is responsible for the day-to-day running of public services and municipalities. Prior to the Gaza war, Palestinian refugee camps in the Gaza Strip were managed by the United Nations Relief and Works Agency for Palestine Refugees in the Near East (UNRWA).

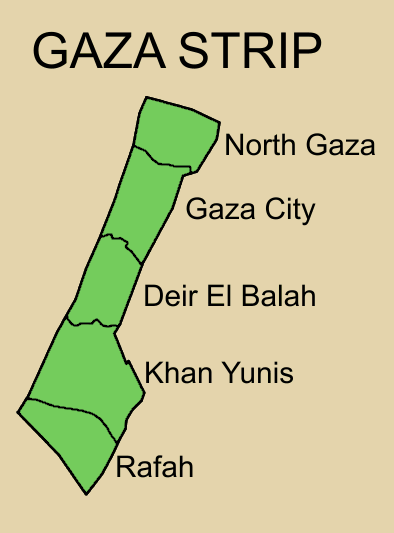
Governorates in the Gaza Strip

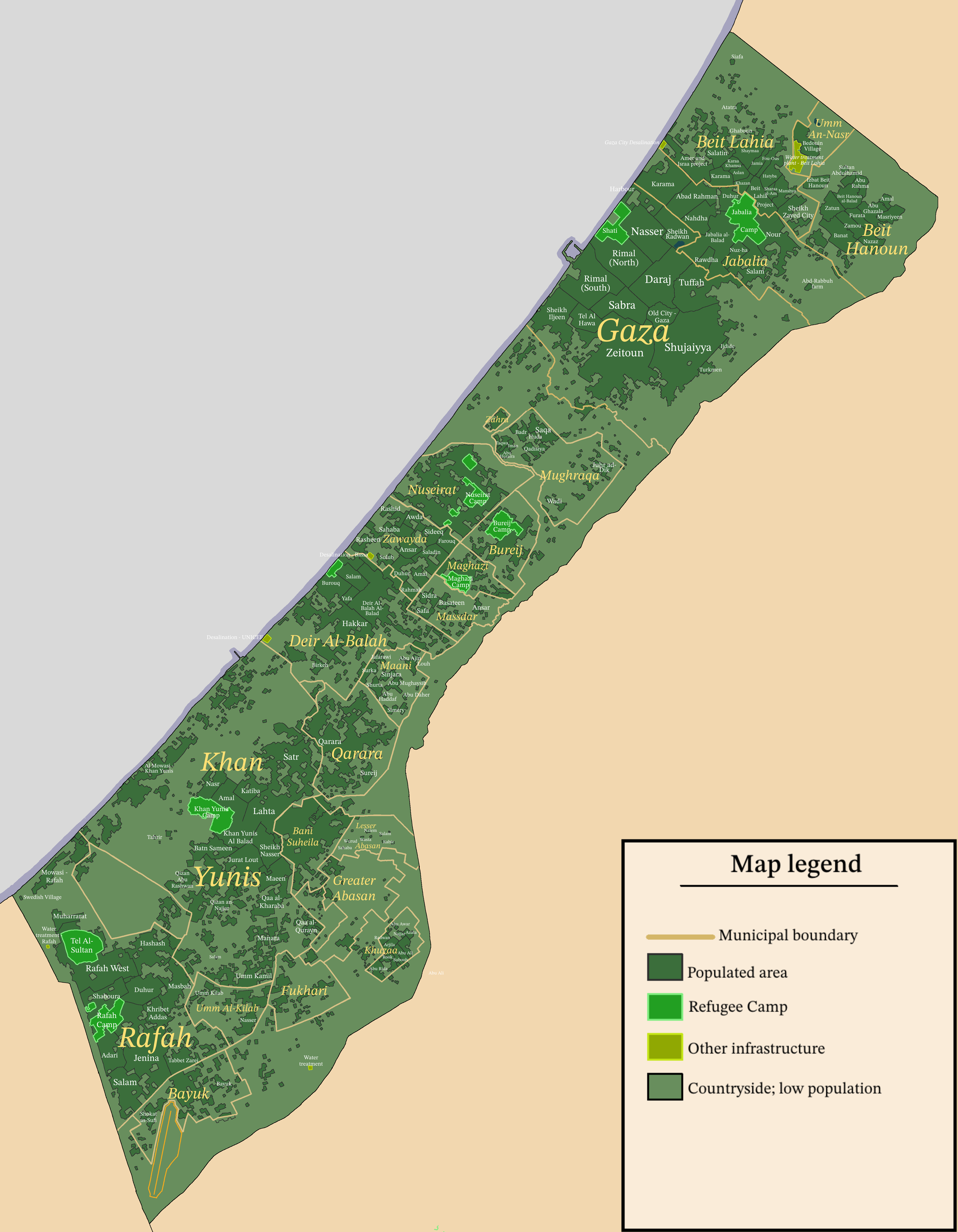
Municipalities in the Gaza Strip

== Security and law enforcement ==
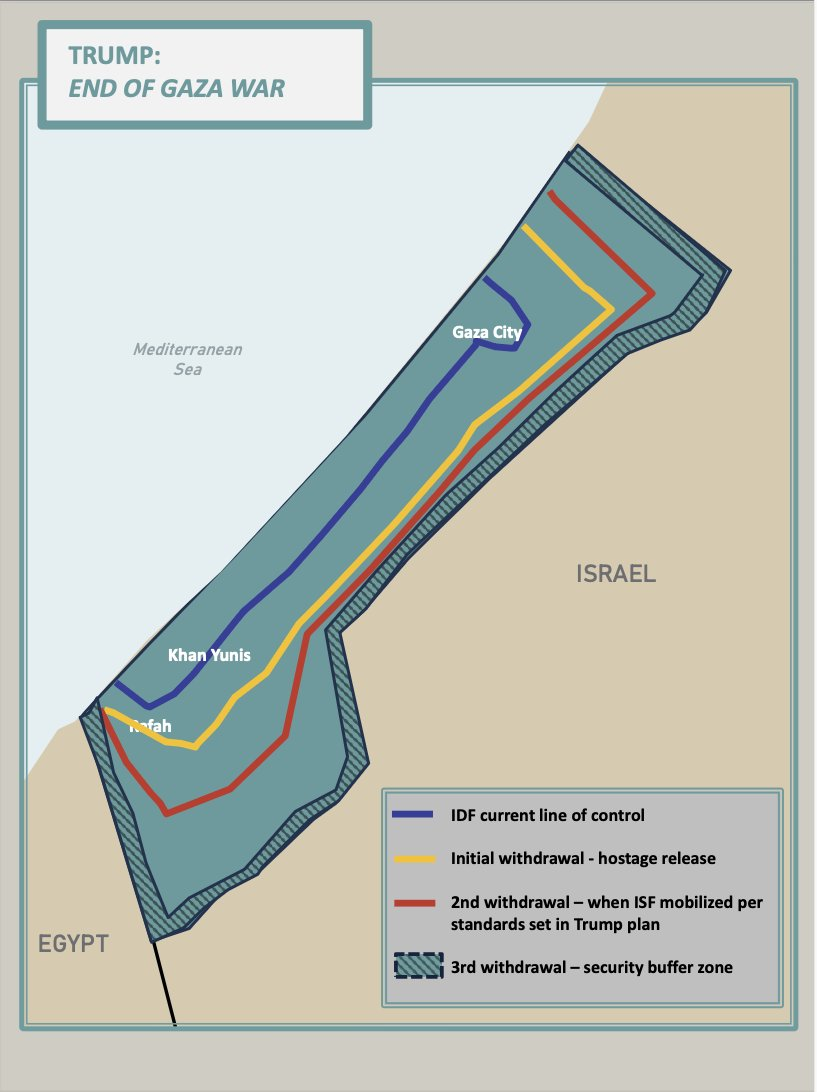
Map of proposed phased withdrawal of the Israeli armed forces from the Gaza Strip

=== International Stabilization Force ===
Resolution 2803 authorises the deployment of an International Stabilization Force, a temporary multinational peacekeeping force to provide strategic stability and operational protection in the Gaza Strip during the transitional period. The plan would see the Israeli armed forces withdraw from most of the Gaza Strip once the International Stabilization Force is deployed.

=== Civil police ===
Resolution 2803 empowers the Board of Peace, with the support of an International Stabilization Force, to "train and provide support to the vetted Palestinian police forces" in the Gaza Strip.

=== International Gaza Support Center ===
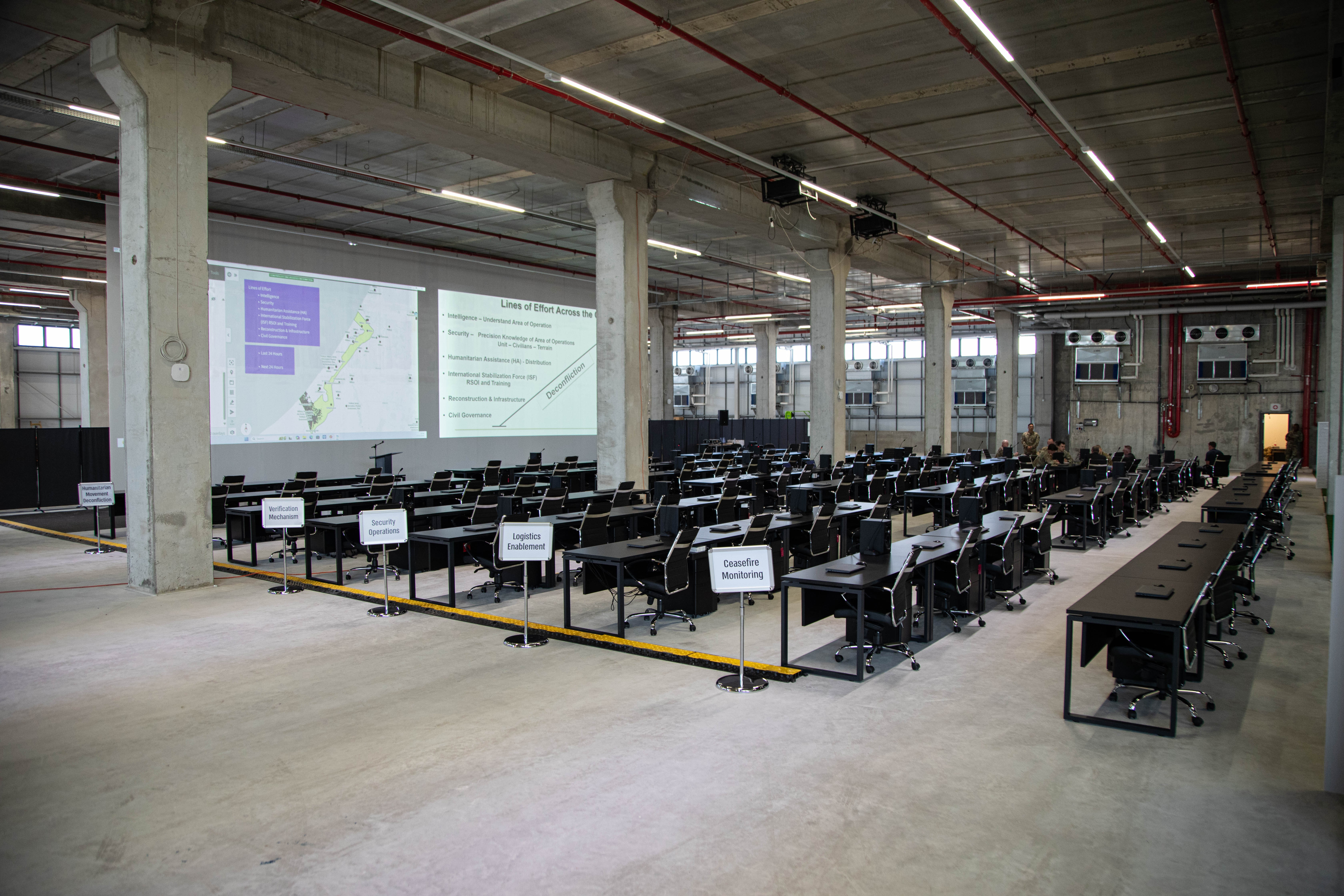
Civil-Military Coordination Center (CMCC) Kiryat Gat, Israel, in October 2025

A International Gaza Support Center, initially known as the Civil-Military Coordination Center (CMCC), under the leadership of Brad Cooper, head of US Central Command was set up shortly after the ceasefire agreement came into effect on 10 October 2025. The center aims to help facilitate the flow of humanitarian, logistical, and security assistance from international counterparts into Gaza.

== International presence ==
=== European Union ===
The European Union (EU) has two overseas operations in the Palestinian territories: the European Union Border Assistance Mission to Rafah (EUBAM Rafah) and the European Union Mission for the Support of Palestinian Police and Rule of Law (EUPOL COPPS). On 19 November 2025, the EU offered to train 3,000 Gaza police officers through the EUPOL COPPS mission.

=== United Nations ===
United Nations agencies, including the United Nations Office for the Coordination of Humanitarian Affairs, UNICEF, World Food Programme, United Nations High Commissioner for Refugees and the World Health Organization are supporting the delivery of humanitarian aid into the Gaza Strip. The United Nations Special Coordinator for the Middle East Peace Process coordinates the humanitarian and development work of UN agencies and programmes in the West Bank and Gaza Strip. Prior to the Gaza war, Palestinian refugee camps in the Gaza Strip were managed by the United Nations Relief and Works Agency.

=== World Bank Group ===
Under the terms of the Gaza peace plan, financing for the reconstruction of the Gaza Strip is to come come from a trust fund backed by the World Bank.

=== Other international NGOs ===
Other international non-governmental organisations supporting aid and reconstruction efforts in the Gaza Strip include the International Red Cross and Red Crescent Movement and Save the Children.

== See also ==
- List of territories administered by the United Nations
- Project New Gaza
- Israeli–Palestinian peace process
- Two-state solution

=== Similar governmental bodies ===
- United Nations Administered West New Guinea
- United Nations Administered Cambodia
- United Nations Administered East Timor
- United Nations Administered Kosovo
