= Yellow Line (Gaza) =

Demarcation line halving Gaza as part of the October 2025 peace plan

Yellow Line الخط الأصفر הקו הצהוב
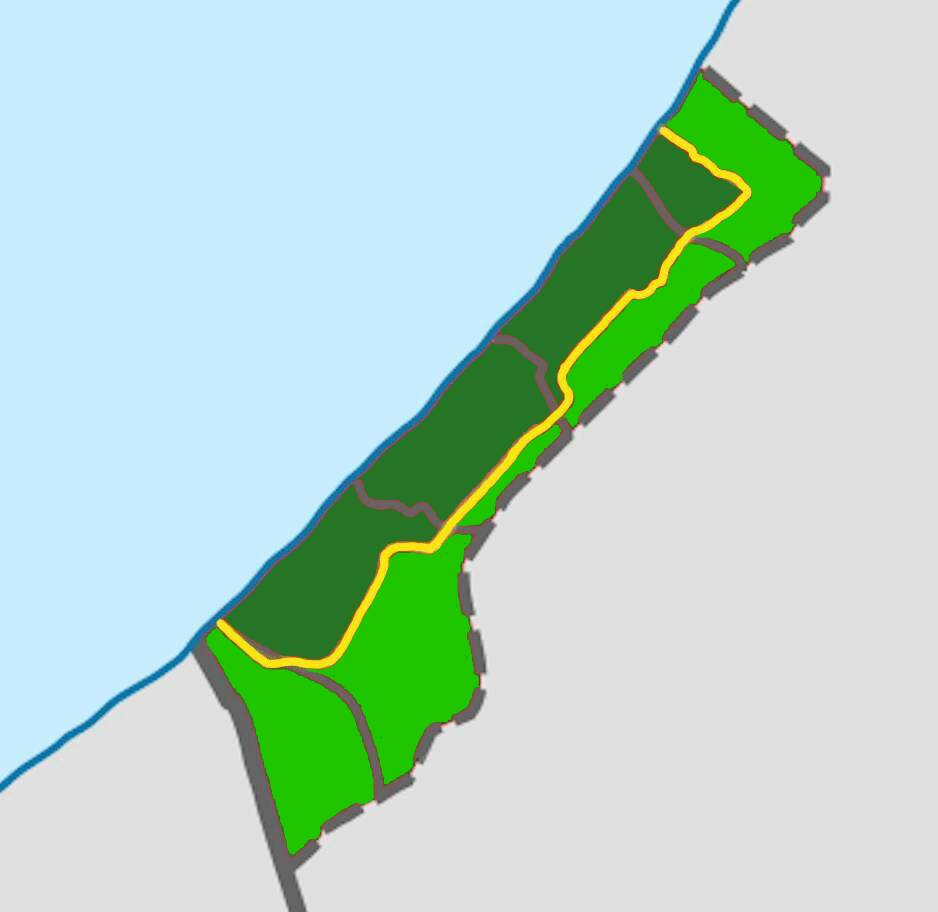
- The Yellow Line and zones of control in Gaza: Yellow Line Territory controlled by Hamas (Note: The Gaza Strip experienced a widespread societal breakdown during the war that resulted in the near-collapse of Hamas's rule and the emergence of a power vacuum filled by various armed groups. Immediately following the 10 October 2025 ceasefire, Hamas worked to reassert its authority and initiated a widespread crackdown on local anti-Hamas armed groups west of the Yellow Line. By 21 October, the IDF evaluated that Hamas had reestablished political and security control in its portion of Gaza down to the municipal level and had effectively eliminated those rival groups.) Territory controlled by Israel

Characteristics
- Entities: Hamas government in Gaza; State of Israel (Israeli occupation of the Gaza Strip); Popular Forces administration in the Gaza Strip; Counter-Terrorism Strike Force administration in the Gaza Strip; Shuja'iyya Popular Defense Forces administration in the Gaza Strip
- Length: 45 kilometres (28 mi)

History
- Established: October 2025
- Treaties: Gaza peace plan

The Yellow Line is a demarcation line that has divided the Gaza Strip in two since the October 2025 implementation of the Gaza peace plan intended to end the Gaza war. The line originally separated 47% of the territory in the western area, which is Palestinian-controlled, from the 53% of the Gaza Strip controlled by Israel. Gazans have been displaced to the area west of the line. Since its initial creation, Israel has moved the yellow line blocks further into Gaza.

In May 2026, Israel said that it had increased its control to 60% of the Gaza Strip, and seeks to expand that figure to 70%.

== Background ==
As part of the broader, ongoing Israeli–Palestinian conflict, the Gaza Strip was occupied by Israel during the Six-Day War in 1967. Although Israel maintains that it ended its occupation of Gaza through a disengagement in 2005, international law has continued to regard the Gaza Strip as illegally occupied territory. Periodic conflicts between Israel and Palestinian armed groups in Gaza, including Hamas, culminated in the October 7 attacks in 2023, triggering the Gaza war and genocide. The Gaza peace plan aims to end the war through a ceasefire and phased withdrawal of Israeli forces.

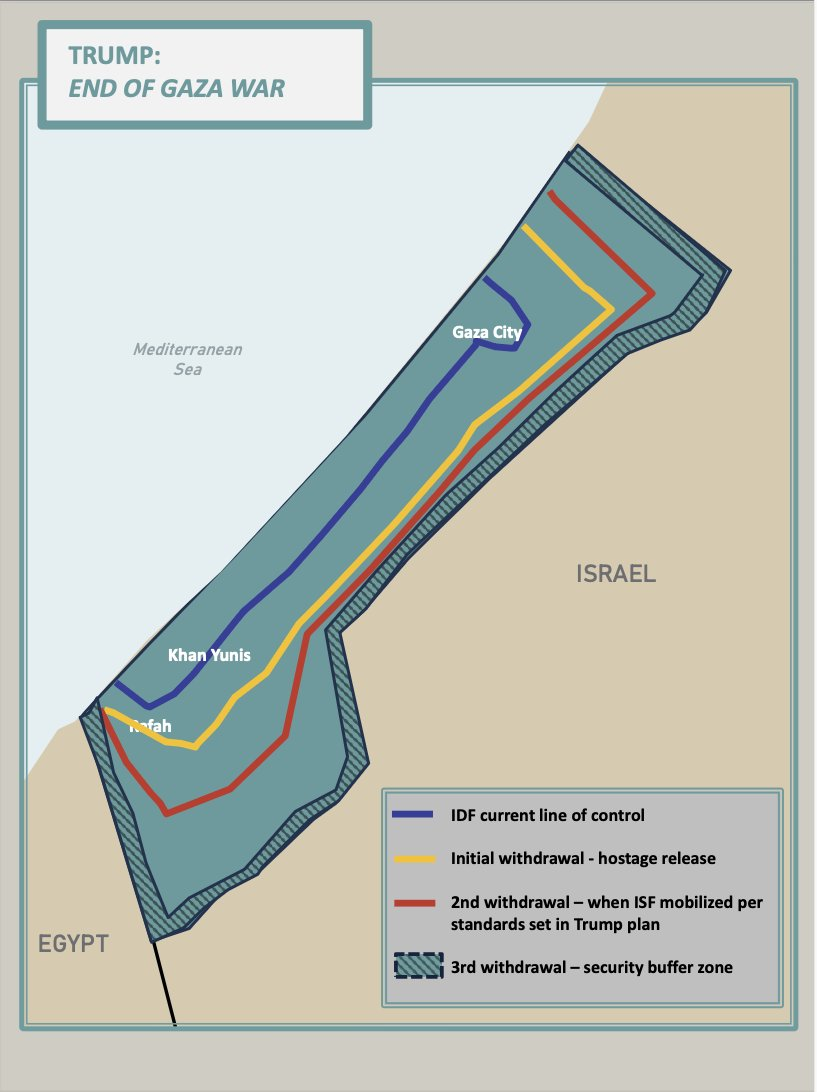
The notional concept of the line as it appeared in the original draft of the Gaza peace plan, with the blue line representing existing conditions (at the time of the original draft), and the yellow line representing the first of three withdrawals by the IDF.

The map of the Yellow Line as part of the Gaza peace plan was first released by United States president Donald Trump on his social media platform Truth Social. On 10 October 2025, the Gaza peace plan came into effect. This peace plan envisioned 3 phases, the first of which contained the Israel Defense Forces withdrawing to the Yellow Line. The second phase could include the IDF withdrawing to a Red Line further east, but that phase is not yet negotiated. Both the second and third phases are yet to be negotiated between Israel and Hamas, and had not occurred as of 13 October.

== Description ==
The Yellow Line stretches for about 45 kilometres (28 mi) and splits the Gaza Strip into two sections. The area east of the line, covering 53% of the Gaza Strip's territory, is under Israeli military control, while the area west of the line, covering 47% of the Gaza Strip, is controlled by Hamas. (Note: The Gaza Strip is 365 km^{2} in area.) The US has referred to the Palestinian-controlled western area as the "red zone" and the Israeli-controlled eastern area as the "green zone".

Israel prevents Palestinians from crossing east of the line, including those displaced from this area during the war, and has killed Palestinians it alleges to have been approaching the line. Israel has declared all areas of the Gaza Strip outside of the Yellow Line to be a free-fire zone, regardless of whether the boundary has been marked on the ground. Israel has also built concrete outposts to fortify its positions along the line. The demarcation line is currently partially marked by yellow-painted concrete blocks laid down by the Israeli military; as of 28 October 2025, around 10–20% of that work had been completed. Israel began constructing berms along the line in December 2025.

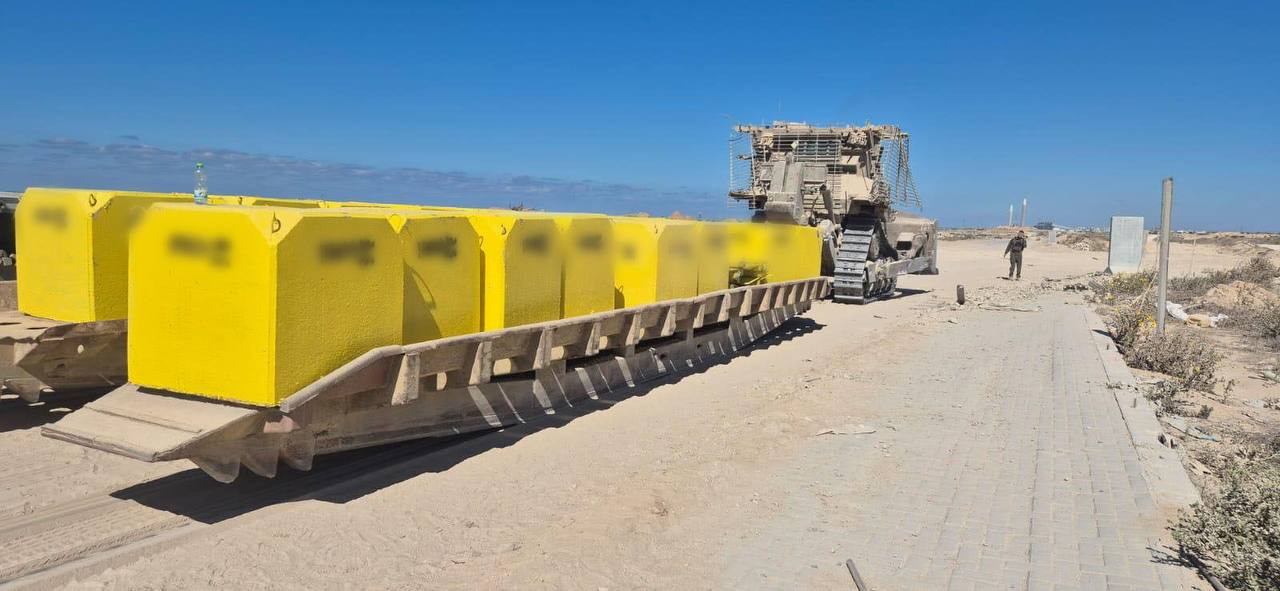
IDF staging yellow-painted concrete blocks for demarcating the Yellow Line (October 2025)

Satellite images show that Israel has placed markers outside of the boundary indicated on the agreed ceasefire maps, sometimes by hundreds of meters. In mid-December, Haaretz reported that Israeli markers demarcating the Yellow Line were being moved west surreptitiously and without warning.

In January 2026, based on satellite imagery, BBC Verify reported that Israel moved the yellow blocks in several areas deeper into the Gaza Strip, causing confusion for Palestinians. According to the report, satellite images showed that Israeli troops moved at least seven blocks in Tuffah, Gaza City between 27 November and 25 December 2025, with the markers moved around 295 meters deeper into the strip. Andreas Krieg, a professor and Middle East expert from King's College London, called the movement of the blocks as a "tool for territorial engineering".

In late April 2026, Israel reportedly planned the establishment of an "Orange Line", after military maps showed an expanded restricted area adding 11% of Gaza's territory beyond the "Yellow Line". Reuters additionally reported that Israel was effectively in control of at least 64% of the territory.

In May 2026, Israeli prime minister Benjamin Netanyahu stated that Israel extended its control to 60% of the Gaza Strip. Netanyahu said that he ordered the IDF to extend its control to 70% of the Gaza Strip.

On 21 July 2026, based on satellite imagery provided by Planet Labs, the Associated Press reported that the berms constructed by the Israeli military now spanned over 23 kilometres (14 mi), separating the portion of the Strip under Israeli control from the rest of the territory. On 28 July 2026, Reuters reported that residents in Deir al-Balah, Khan Younis, Gaza City, and northern Rafah stated that Israeli forces had advanced the yellow blocks over the prior 10 days.

== Impact ==
The vast majority of Gaza's population was forcibly displaced during the 2023 war. As of November 2025, their ability to return home is limited both by the widespread destruction of homes themselves, and by Israel preventing Palestinians' return to those parts of Gaza that are on the eastern, Israeli-controlled, side of the Yellow Line.

As of 2025, the vast majority of the Gaza Strip's population of 2 million people is located in the Palestinian-controlled western portion of Gaza. Estimates vary as to the number of people remaining east of the line. A report from October 2025 stated that hundreds of Palestinians lived in the Israeli-controlled eastern portion, including some Gazans who spoke out against Hamas during the war. Another estimate states that less than 2% of Gazans currently live east of the Yellow Line. Most of Gaza's agricultural land, as well as the border crossing with Egypt, are under Israeli control.

The number of Gazans who lived east of the Yellow Line was in the hundreds of thousands in 2023 (for example, in 2017, more than 200,000 people lived in Rafah including Rafah Camp, and more than 50,000 in Beit Hanoun). The depopulation of this area is a recent phenomenon that occurred since 2023 during the Gaza War, as Israel issued evacuation orders, and due to actions of the Israeli military that forced the inhabitants of that area to leave.

On 2 December 2025, Israeli military forces destroyed residential structures in eastern Gaza City located on the Israeli-controlled side of the Yellow Line. By January 2026, the Gaza Health Ministry reported that 77 Palestinians were killed by Israeli forces near the Yellow Line, including 62 of them who crossed the line.

== Analysis ==
Some Palestinians in Gaza expressed concerns in October 2025 that the Yellow Line, intended as a temporary ceasefire line, may become a permanent border. In November 2025, Wall Street Journal commentators observed that the Yellow Line is becoming increasingly entrenched.

In December 2025, Israeli Chief of the General Staff Eyal Zamir referred to the Yellow Line as a "new border line" for Israel, telling IDF forces that Israel intended to hold onto its current military positions in Gaza.

== See also ==
- Gaza Strip under Resolution 2803
- Green Line (1949)
- Blue Line (Lebanon, 2000)
- Purple Line (1967 War)
