= 56th World Economic Forum =

2026 conference in Davos, Switzerland

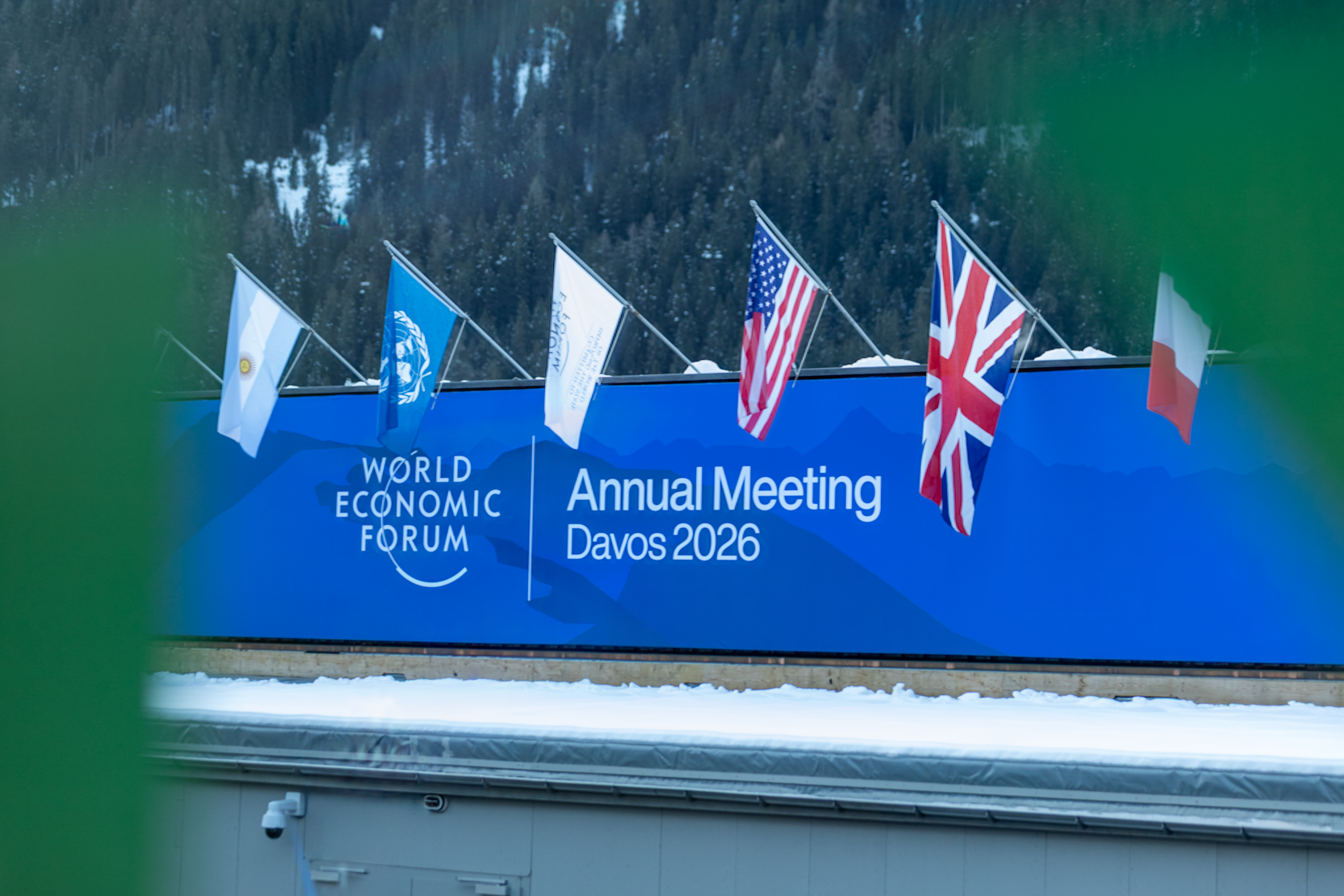
- Dates: 19–23 January 2026
- City: Davos, Switzerland

The 56th World Economic Forum, also known as Davos 2026, was held from 19 to 23 January 2026 in Davos, Switzerland. Occurring at a time of heightened tensions between the United States and its NATO allies, including Canada, Greenland, and Europe, especially over the Greenland crisis, there were major speeches by world leaders including Mark Carney, Ursula von der Leyen and Donald Trump. Other events at the forum included the inaugural meeting of the Board of Peace.

== Background ==
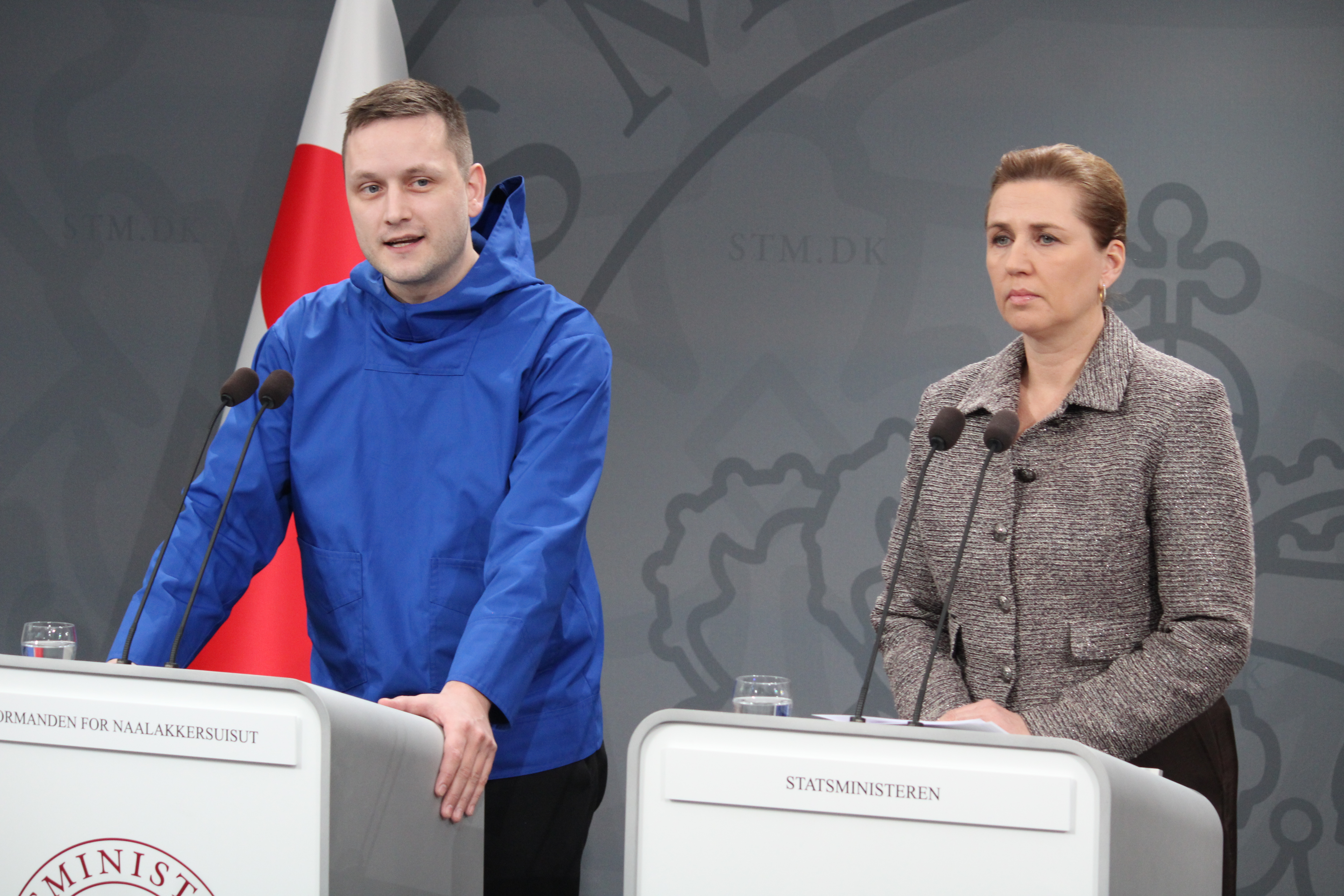
Greenlandic leader Jens Frederik-Nielsen announcing "We choose Denmark" at a press conference with Mette Frederiksen in response to Trump's threats to invade or annex the country, 13 January 2026

The World Economic Forum is an international think tank based in Switzerland. It hosts an annual conference in Davos, a Swiss Alpine resort town, with a significant number of government leaders from around the world as well as prominent businessmen and celebrities often in attendance. The 56th annual meeting was held in late January 2026. The 56th World Economic Forum was held at a time of significant global tensions, particularly surrounding the foreign policies of United States president Donald Trump, such as the Greenland crisis.

Iranian Foreign Minister Abbas Araghchi's invitation to the World Economic Forum in Davos was revoked in response to the government's violent crackdown on domestic protests. Araghchi blamed Israel and the U.S. for the cancellation, claiming the decision was based on "lies and political pressure" from the "Israeli regime and its backers".

Israeli Prime Minister Benjamin Netanyahu skipped the Davos summit due to fears of arrest. Switzerland, as a signatory to the Rome Statute, is legally obliged to enforce the International Criminal Court (ICC) warrants issued in November 2024 against Netanyahu and former Defense Minister Yoav Gallant. Israeli President Isaac Herzog attended the forum in Netanyahu's place, criticizing the warrants as "politically motivated" and describing them as a "reward for terror." He argued it is "shameful" and "unacceptable" that international legal actions are preventing senior Israeli officials from attending global summits.

Spanish Prime Minister Pedro Sánchez canceled his planned trip to Davos to visit the site of a fatal train collision in Adamuz, southern Spain, which resulted in over 40 fatalities.

== Themes ==
The five themes for the conference in 2026 were:

1. How can we cooperate in a more contested world?
2. How can we unlock new sources of growth?
3. How can we better invest in people?
4. How can we deploy innovation at scale and responsibly?
5. How can we build prosperity within planetary boundaries?

== Notable speeches ==
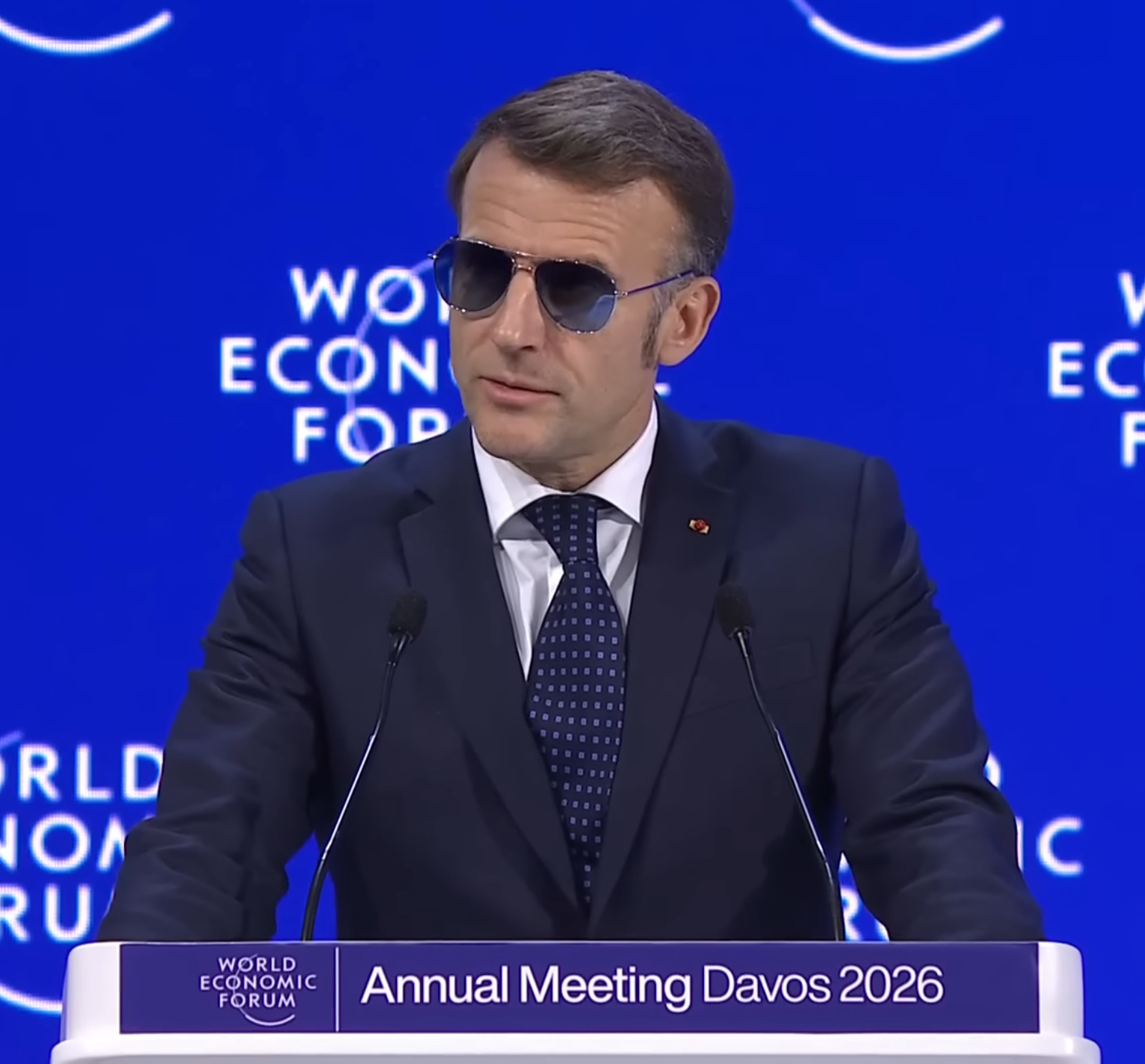
French President Emmanuel Macron at the WEF

Special addresses by ten major leaders were the featured sessions on the three main days of the conference. In the order of running, the speakers were:

1. Ursula von der Leyen, President of the European Commission
2. He Lifeng, Vice Premier of China
3. Alexander Stubb, President of Finland
4. Emmanuel Macron, President of France
5. Mark Carney, Prime Minister of Canada
6. Abdel Fattah el-Sisi, President of Egypt
7. Donald Trump, President of the United States
8. Javier Milei, President of Argentina
9. Friedrich Merz, Chancellor of Germany
10. Prabowo Subianto, President of Indonesia
11. Volodymyr Zelenskyy, President of Ukraine

=== Mark Carney ===
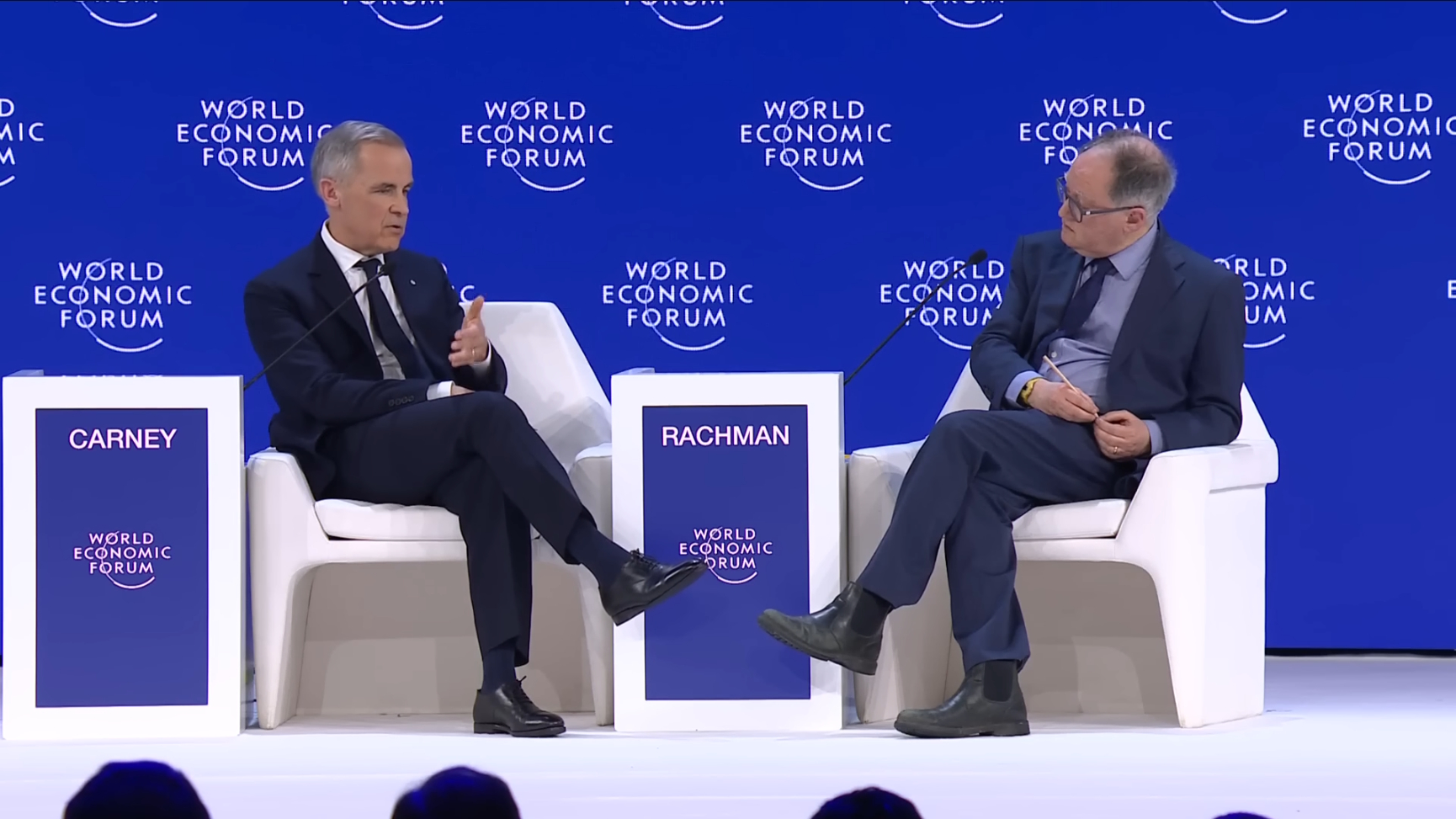
Gideon Rachman interviewing Canadian Prime Minister Mark Carney at the WEF

Canadian Prime Minister Mark Carney noted that the "rules-based international order" was partly a fiction, as the strongest often exempt themselves from rules when convenient.

Carney's speech emphasized the importance of middle powers in the face of a "rupture in world order" and stated that "geopolitics is submitted to no limits". Carney noted a change from the perception of a "rules-based international order" to a geopolitical situation where "great powers have begun using economic integration as weapons, tariffs as leverage, financial infrastructure as coercion, [and] supply chains as vulnerabilities to be exploited." Carney called for middle powers to unite against this perceived geopolitical shift and stated that such powers have "most to gain from genuine cooperation".

Carney's speech, while not directly mentioning Trump, has been interpreted as a response to Trump's claims over Greenland and amplified fears over proposals made by Trump to annex Canada, with Canadian consumers limiting travel to and imports from America and prioritizing Canadian-made goods due to such threats.

=== Volodymyr Zelenskyy ===
Ukrainian President Zelenskyy voiced strong support for the anti-government protests in Iran. He criticized the international community for remaining passive as the protests were suppressed, describing the crackdown as "drowned in blood." Zelenskyy warned that if the Iranian regime survives this crackdown, it sends a "clear signal to every bully" that they can stay in power by killing enough people.

=== Emmanuel Macron ===
During his speech at the forum on 20 January 2026, French President Emmanuel Macron emphasized the importance of increasing Chinese foreign direct investment (FDI) in key European sectors to promote economic growth and facilitate technology transfer. He urged China to move beyond simply exporting products to Europe and instead focus on local manufacturing and physical presence on the continent.

=== Bart De Wever ===
Belgian Prime Minister Bart De Wever warned that Europe risks becoming a "miserable slave" to the United States if it does not unite. He accused Donald Trump of "crossing red lines," specifically citing threats related to Greenland.

=== Donald Trump ===
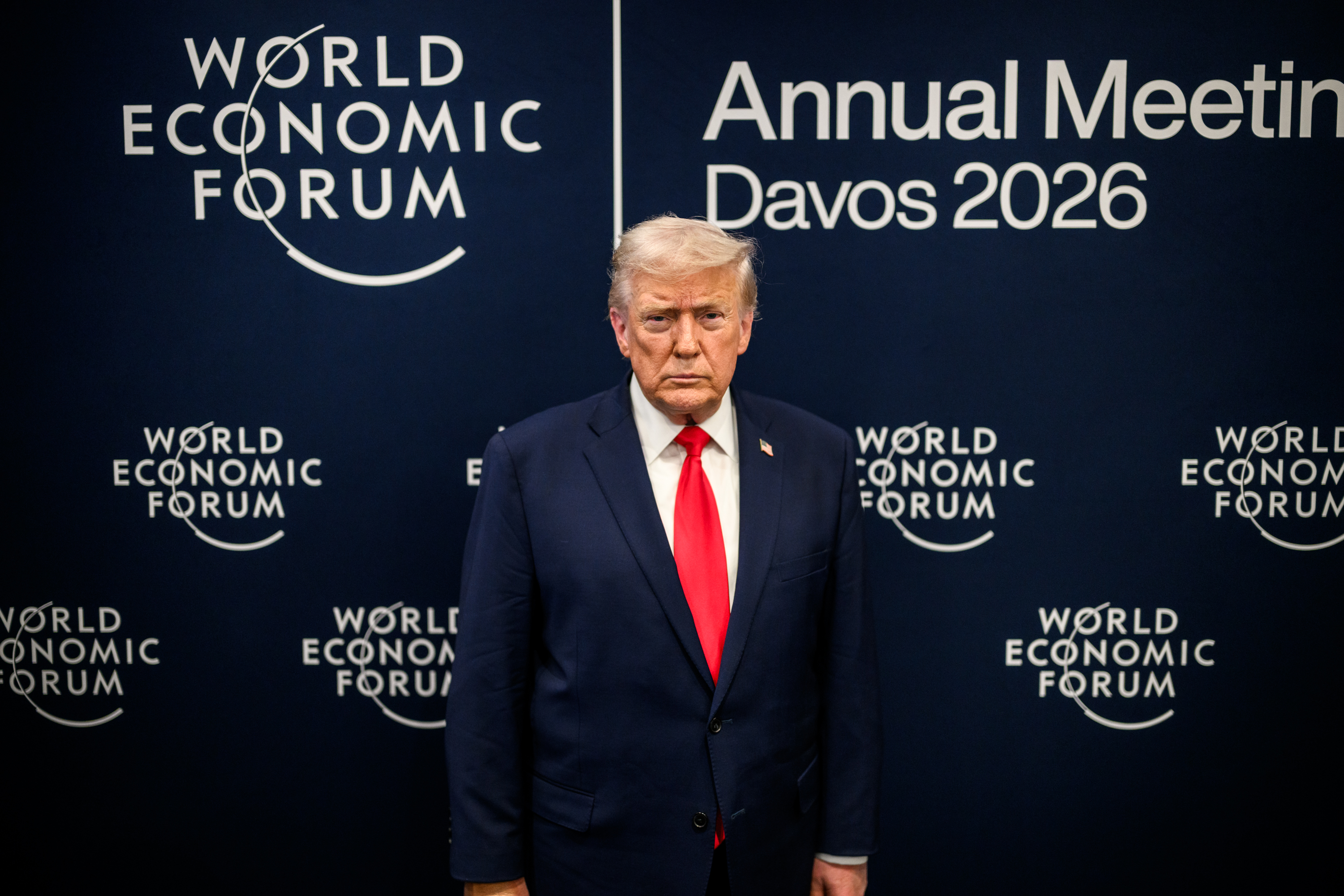
President Donald Trump at Davos

President of the United States Donald Trump addressed the forum on 21 January. Trump began his speech by describing the forum as "a who's who," before saying that he had brought "truly phenomenal news from America." He claimed that the US was "in the midst of the fastest and most dramatic economic turnaround in our country's history... Just over one year ago, under the radical left Democrats, we were a dead country. Now we are the hottest country anywhere in the world." He continued by saying that the United States was "the economic engine on the planet... You all follow us down and you follow us up."

Trump then said that he would describe how he had done this so that other world leaders could follow his example. He stated that Western governments had followed a consensus on achieving economic growth through government spending, mass immigration, and foreign imports, a consensus that was having the effect that "many parts of our world are being destroyed before our very eyes, and the leaders don't even understand what's happening. And the ones that do understand aren't doing anything about it." He then listed a wide range of measures his government was taking, including reducing the size of the civil service, cutting taxes domestically while imposing tariffs on imports, slashing government funding and regulations, making international trade agreements, ramping up domestic oil and gas production, building new nuclear power plants, and the 2026 United States intervention in Venezuela. He repeatedly attacked Joe Biden and the European left, while also warning against pursuing environment-friendly policies, calling them "perhaps the greatest hoax in history."

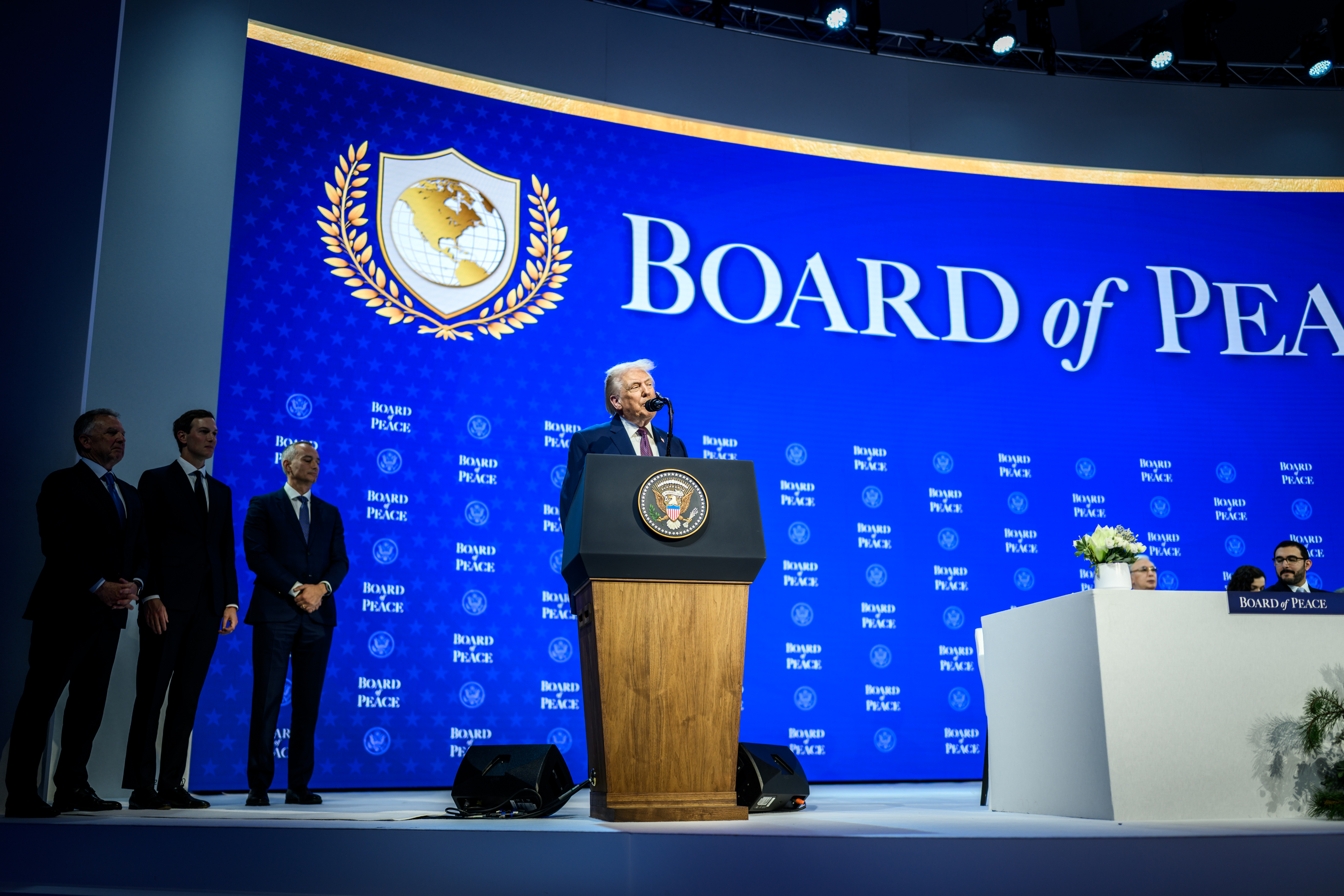
Donald Trump addressing the Board of Peace during the World Economic Forum in Davos on 22 January 2026

Trump subsequently stated that "we believe deeply in the bonds we share with Europe as a civilization," pointing towards his own European ancestry, and repeated his claim that Europeans were "destroying themselves, these beautiful, beautiful places." He then used the example of Greenland to illustrate his point, saying that only the United States could defend Greenland. He stated that World War II showed this, saying that Denmark needed the United States to save them from the German occupation and that "without us, right now you'd all be speaking German and a little Japanese perhaps. After the war, we gave Greenland back to Denmark. How stupid were we to do that? But we did it. But we gave it back. But how ungrateful are they now?" Trump then returned to the topic of the intervention in Venezuela to further show that only the United States could defend Greenland, before saying that Greenland was part of North America and was therefore "our territory. It is therefore a core national security interest of the United States of America. And in fact, it's been our policy for hundreds of years to prevent outside threats from entering our hemisphere." He continued by saying that "the United States is treated very unfairly by NATO," claiming that the 2022 Russian invasion of Ukraine would not have happened if the 2020 American presidential election had not been "rigged." He then returned to the topic of Greenland and pledged not to use force to take over the island, saying that "all the United States is asking for is a place called Greenland."

Trump continued his speech by stating that, under his administration, the American military had become even more powerful and was "bringing back battleships." He then returned to the topic of Greenland, saying that the United States was asking for ownership because "you need the ownership to defend it." He subsequently referred to his proposed Golden Dome missile defence system before referring negatively to Carney's speech, saying that "Canada lives because of the United States. Remember that Mark, the next time you make your statements." Trump then returned to the topic of Ukraine, saying that it was "a bloodbath over there" and that both Russian and Ukrainian presidents Vladimir Putin and Volodymyr Zelenskyy wanted to reach a peace agreement. He added that his diplomacy on Ukraine was helping Europe, but that, following comments the American ambassador made about taking over Iceland, "until the last few days, when I told them about Iceland, they loved me. They called me daddy right last time. Very smart man said he's our daddy. He's running it. I was like running it. I went from running it to being a terrible human being. But now what I'm asking for is a piece of ice, cold and poorly located that can play a vital role in world peace and world protection."

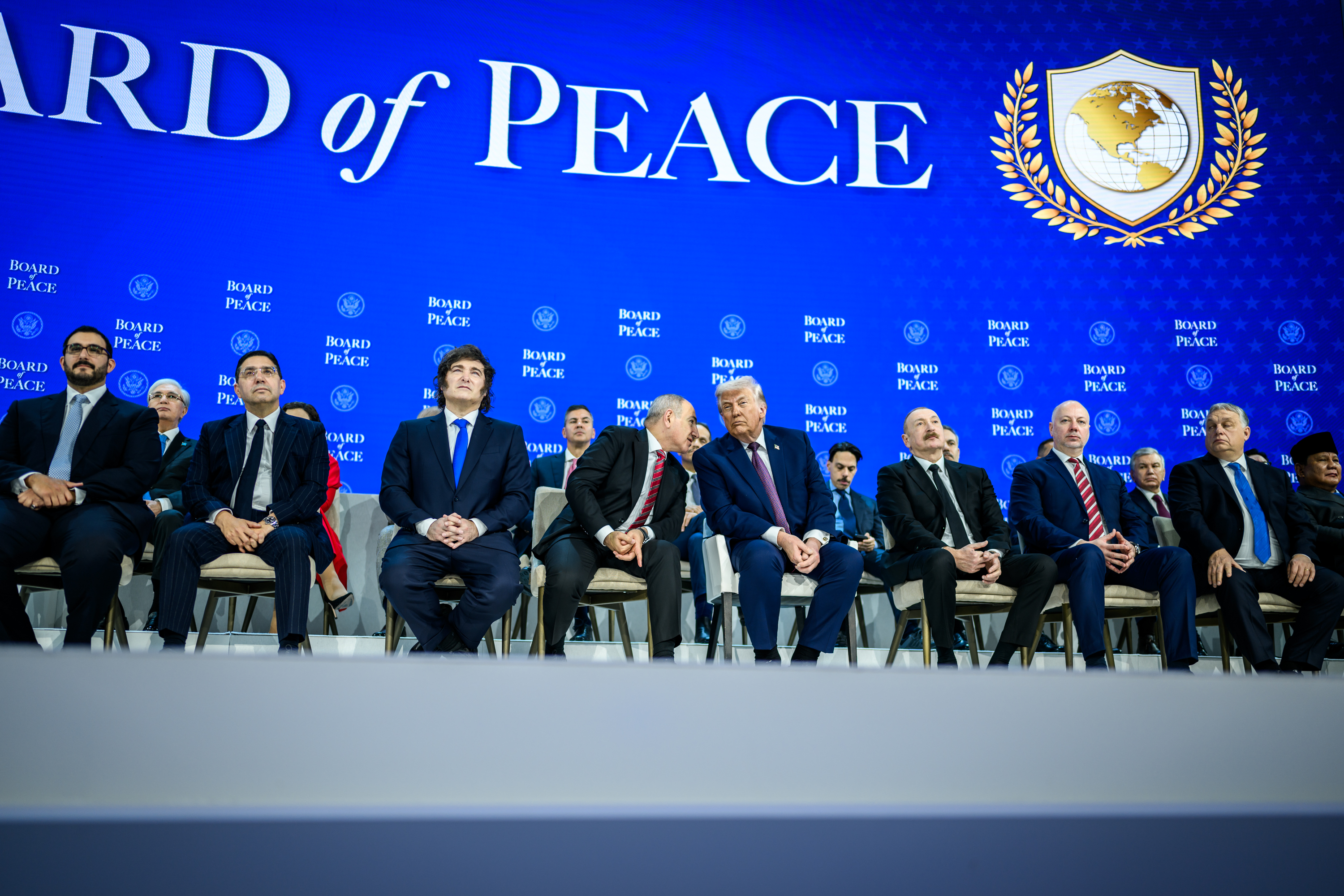
Trump attends the Board of Peace Charter announcement and signing ceremony at the World Economic Forum, 22 January 2026

Trump then briefly talked about American fighter jets, including the under-development Boeing F-47 and the 2025 United States strikes on Iranian nuclear sites, before returning to the topic of Greenland, saying that "we want a piece of ice for world protection, and they won't give it. We've never asked for anything else. And we could have kept that piece of land and we didn't sell. They have a choice. You can say yes, and we will be very appreciative. Or you can say no and we will remember." He subsequently repeated his claims about the performance of the American economy under his leadership, while attacking Biden's economic performance. He then discussed pharmaceutical prices in the United States and the disparity in prices between the US and Europe, saying that "basically America was subsidizing every nation in the world because presidents allowed them to get away with it." Following that, he discussed the housing market in the United States, pledging that "America will not become a nation of renters" and that he would issue an executive order "banning large institutional investors from buying single family homes." He then briefly discussed cryptocurrencies, pledging to make the United States "the crypto capital of the world," and then discussed Chair of the Federal Reserve Jerome Powell, calling him "terrible" and accusing him of disloyalty. After that, he discussed placing tariffs on Swiss watches, before talking again about the performance of the American economy under his administration, and then about Operation Metro Surge and the 2025–2026 domestic military deployments in the United States, saying that "ICE gets beat up by stupid people from leadership in Minnesota. We actually are helping Minnesota so much, but they don't appreciate it. Most places do." He subsequently discussed Somalians, including both the 2020s Minnesota fraud scandals, representative Ilhan Omar, and piracy off the coast of Somalia, saying that Somalians "turned out to be higher IQ than we thought. I always say these are low IQ people. How do they go into Minnesota and steal all that money?"

Trump concluded his speech by saying that "many of you in this room are true pioneers... the future is unlimited. And to a large part, because of you. And we have to protect you, and we have to cherish you," adding that "the United States is back bigger, stronger, better than ever before."

== Reception ==
=== In Davos ===
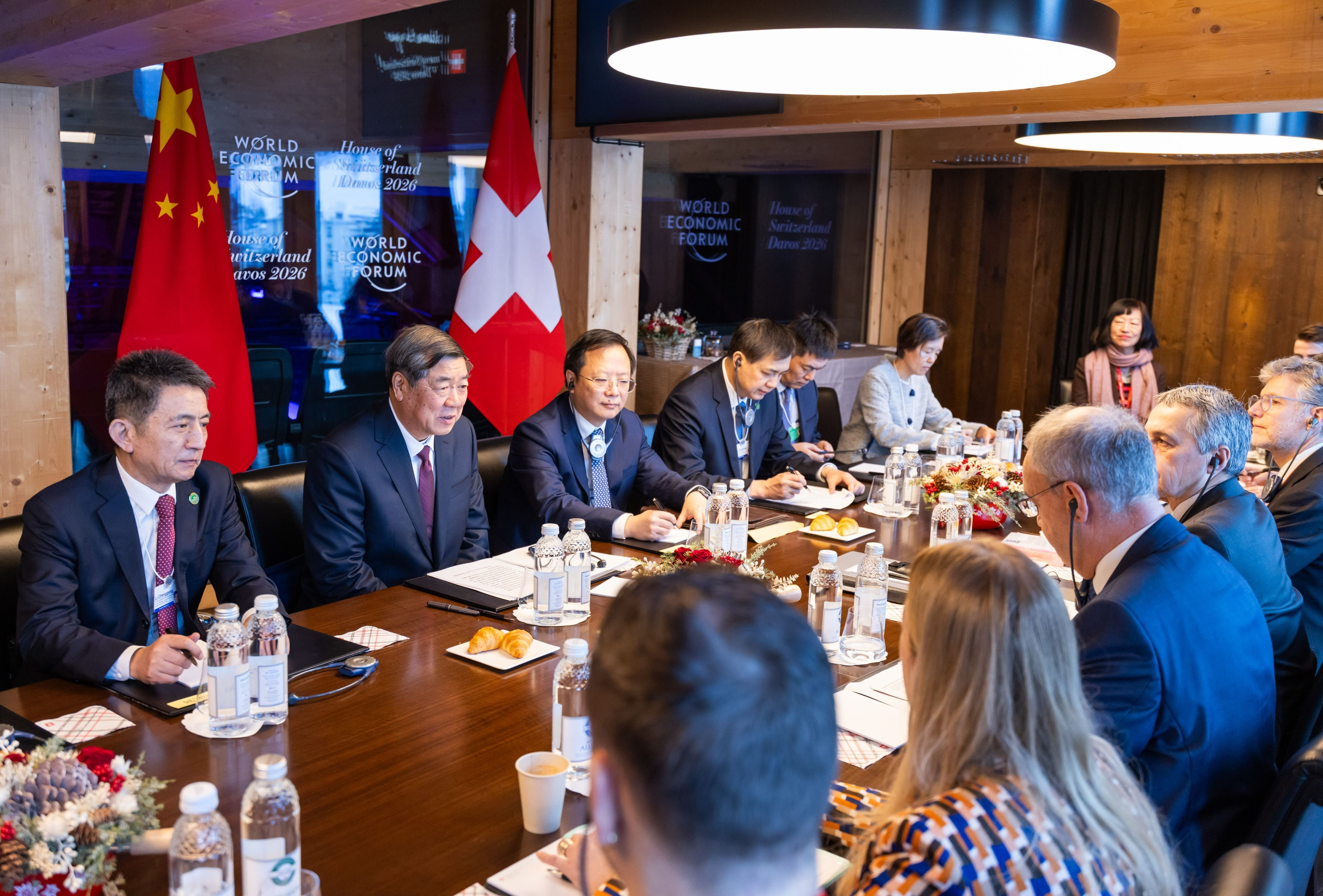
Swiss President Guy Parmelin with Chinese Vice Premier He Lifeng at Davos, 20 January 2026

Adam Cancryn and Kevin Liptak of CNN wrote that, although the hall for Trump's speech was significantly packed, the audience "grew more restless and uncomfortable as the speech wound on, sitting largely in silence and offering only tepid applause at the end of the marathon remarks."

Hundreds of Kurds organized protests in Davos to raise international awareness of the ongoing military offensive carried out by the Syrian transitional government against Kurdish-controlled regions in northeastern Syria.

=== In the United States ===
Governor of California Gavin Newsom (who was in attendance and mentioned by Trump by name) described Trump's speech as "bad," additionally claiming that pressure from Trump's administration had led to a speaking appearance he had been scheduled to make at Davos being cancelled.

=== Elsewhere ===
Treasurer of Australia Jim Chalmers described Carney's speech as "stunning," saying that it was "widely shared and discussed" among the Australian government. Former Australian Prime Minister Malcolm Turnbull also applauded Carney's speech, saying that "if you are integrated with the United States economically or you are dependent on the United States, Trump will use that as a vulnerability and exploit it."

Leader of the right-wing Reform UK Nigel Farage stated that he agreed with Trump that the world would be a better place if the United States took over Greenland, but that the right of Greenlanders to self-determination should be respected.

== Analysis ==
Former high-ranking Canadian diplomat Jeremy Kinsman stated that Carney's speech was "the most consequential speech on global affairs I have ever heard from a Canadian PM." Senator and former diplomat Peter Boehm stated that the speech was the most important foreign policy speech by a Canadian politician since Secretary of State for External Affairs Louis St. Laurent 1947 speech defining Canada's post-World War II foreign policy. Stewart Prest of the University of British Columbia wrote that Carney's speech was "a remarkable departure from Canada's usual approach to its relationship its neighbour to the south," adding that "the speech was remarkably blunt in its rebuke of America's foreign policy."

The speeches by Carney and Trump were widely compared in the media. Ravi Agrawal of Foreign Policy wrote that the conference "has turned out to be a tale of two speeches," contrasting Trump's "rambling and bullying of his country's closest allies" with Carney's "eloquent exposition of the dangers of a world where might makes right." Mark Shanahan of the University of Surrey wrote that "the style and tone" of the two speeches "could not have been more different," saying that "one leader donned the cloak of statesmanship at Davos this week. It wasn't Donald Trump."

According to Eli Stokols and Diana Nerozzi of Politico Europe, although Trump's statement that he would not invade Greenland was met with relief, his speech "did little to reverse a deepening sentiment among NATO leaders and other longtime allies that they can no longer consider the United States — for 80 years the linchpin of the transatlantic alliance — a reliable ally."
