= Ali Shaath =

Chair of the interim government of Gaza

- علي شعث
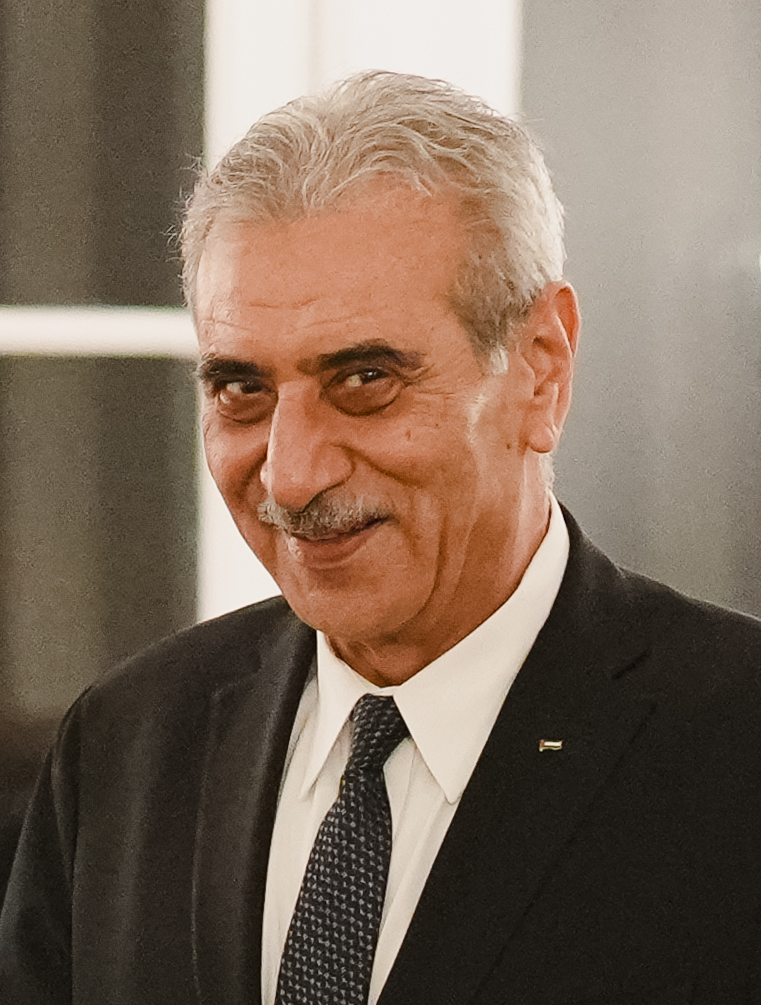

Chief Commissioner of the National Committee for the Administration of Gaza
- Incumbent
- Assumed office January 14, 2026
- Preceded by: Office established

Personal details
- Born: 14 July 1958 (age 68) Khan Yunis, Gaza Strip, Palestine
- Education: Ain Shams University; Queen's University Belfast

Ali Shaath (Arabic: علي شعث; born July 14, 1958) is a Palestinian official and civil engineer. He had been named as Chief Commissioner of the National Committee for the Administration of Gaza. Before this he served as an apolitical technocrat in the Palestinian Authority.

== Chief Commissioner National Committee ==
On January 14, 2026, Shaath was named as Chief Commissioner of the National Committee for the Administration of Gaza in a joint statement by Qatari, Egyptian and Turkish mediators of the Gaza peace plan. He has held several positions in the Palestinian Authority, including in relation to transportation and planning. As Chair of the NCAG, he is expected to oversee the provision of humanitarian aid and reconstruction of the Gaza Strip following heavy Israeli bombardment during the Gaza war and genocide.

In a statement, Shaath stated that the committee would focus on establishing security in the Gaza Strip and restoring infrastructure destroyed during the war, including electricity, water, healthcare, and education.

== Biography ==
Shaath was born on July 14, 1958 in Khan Younis to politically connected clan with extensive ties to Palestinian President Mahmoud Abbas. He first studied civil engineering in Cairo, before earning a PhD in infrastructure engineering from Queen's University Belfast. His academic background has positioned him as a lifelong apolitical technocrat. He then went on to hold several governmental posts withing the Palestinian Authority such as: undersecretary at the Ministry of Planning, deputy minister of the Ministry of Planning, as well as positions withing the Ministries of Communication and Transport.

== Politics ==
Shaath is a supporter of a two-state solution to the Israel-Palestine Conflict. In a 2011 radio interview Shaath expressed a belief in a Palestinian desire for peace, he also argued Jews who wanted Palestinian citizenship could in the future be able to live and buy land in the Palestinian Authority, where Israeli civilians are currently banned from entering or purchasing land.

== See also ==
- Gaza Strip under Resolution 2803
- National Committee for the Administration of Gaza
