= Saeid Golkar =

Iranian-American political scientist

Academic background
- Education: University of Tehran (PhD)
- Thesis: بررسی وابط دولت و دانشگاه در ایران پس از انقلاب ۱۳۵۷-۱۳۸۴ (Analyzing the Relation of the State and University in Post-Revolution Iran 1979-2004) (2008)

Academic work
- Era: Contemporary era
- Discipline: Political science
- Institutions: University of Tennessee at Chattanooga

Saeid Golkar (Persian: سعید گلکار) is an Iranian-American political scientist, and UC Foundation Associate Professor at the University of Tennessee at Chattanooga, Senior Fellow at the Tony Blair Institute for Global Change, and Senior Policy Advisor at United Against Nuclear Iran (UANI).

== Biography ==
Saeid Golkar was born in Iran, where he earned a Ph.D. in political science from the University of Tehran. In 2010, he immigrated to the United States and served as a professor and researcher at Stanford and Northwestern. Later, he was appointed associate professor in the Department of Political Science at the University of Tennessee at Chattanooga.

Golkar previously served as a Visiting Fellow at The Washington Institute for Near East Policy. He has published articles covering post-revolutionary Iran through the institute.

== Research focus and main views ==
Golkar specializes in the politics of authoritarian regimes, with a particular focus on Iran. His research examines the mechanisms of social control employed by the Iranian state, especially through paramilitary organizations such as the Basij.

Golkar argues that the Basij is a socio-political network permeating all aspects of Iranian life, and that Basij serves as a tool for political repression and social indoctrination. According to Golkar, the Basij's main function is to ensure regime stability through intimidation, and highlights that many Iranians join the Basij for reasons such as economic benefits, preferential access to education, and employment opportunities, rather than out of ideological commitment.

His book has been described as a “groundbreaking contribution to the understanding of Iranian politics”, and was honored with The Washington Institute's Silver Medal Book Prize.

== Publications ==
- Golkar, Saeid. Captive Society: The Basij Militia and Social Control in Post-revolutionary Iran. Woodrow Wilson Center Press/Columbia University Press, 2015.
- Golkar, Saeid (2026-06-09). Dictators and the Higher Education Dilemma: State Power and the University in Modern Iran. Rutgers University Press. ISBN 978-1-9788-4269-4.
