= Gaza International Transitional Authority =

International administration for the Gaza Strip proposed by Tony Blair in 2025

The Gaza International Transitional Authority (GITA; Arabic: السلطة الانتقالية الدولية في غزة, romanized: alsultat alaintiqaliat alduwaliat fi ghaza) was a body proposed in September 2025 by former British prime minister Tony Blair to administer the Gaza Strip in the aftermath of the Gaza war.

Many of Blair's proposals were incorporated into the Gaza peace plan presented by United States president Donald Trump on 29 September 2025 which was accepted by Hamas and Israel on 8 October and authorized by the United Nations Security Council on 17 November 2025 through Resolution 2803.

== Background ==
The Gaza war began in October 2023 following a series of coordinated armed attacks carried out by Hamas and several other Palestinian militant groups in southern Israel on 7 October 2023.

Former British prime minister Tony Blair, through his think tank the Tony Blair Institute for Global Change, began developing a post-war plan for the Gaza Strip in July 2025 and discussed the idea with US president Donald Trump and his adviser Jared Kushner at a meeting at the White House on 27 August 2025.

News of Blair's proposals was first reported by the Times of Israel on 18 September 2025. On 25 September 2025, it was reported that Blair himself was interested in being a member of the authority's Board and has also been suggested as a potential chair.

US president Donald Trump shared a draft 20-point Gaza peace plan with Arab and Muslim majority countries on the sidelines of the 80th session of the United Nations General Assembly in September 2025. Article 9 of the Trump deal incorporates Blair's proposals for a local executive committee overseen by an international board, and Article 15 describes plans for a multinational peacekeeping force and locally recruited civilian police service.

Trump's plan was agreed by Hamas and the Israeli government on 8 October 2025 and a ceasefire came into effect two days later. It was endorsed by the United Nations through Resolution 2803 which welcomed the formation of the Board of Peace, authorizes the deployment of the International Stabilization Force and empowers a Palestinian executive committee to manage the day-to-day governance of the Gaza Strip.

The proposal was modelled on earlier transitional administrations mandated by the United Nations in West New Guinea (UNTEA), Cambodia (UNTAC), Eastern Slavonia (UNTAES), Kosovo (UNMIK) and East Timor (UNTAET).

== Proposed structure ==
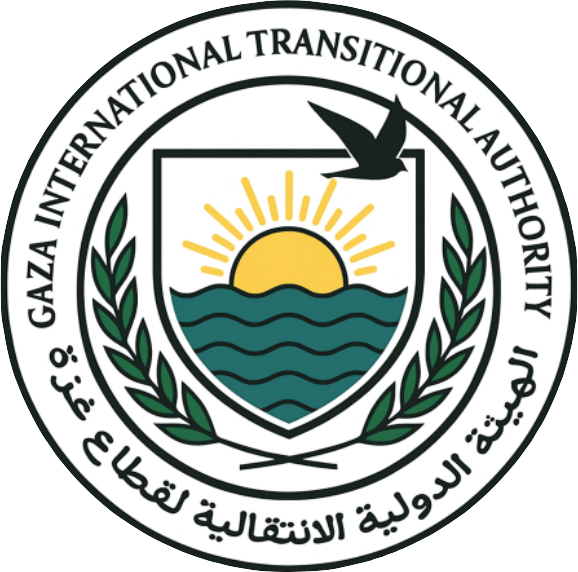
Proposed logo of the GITA

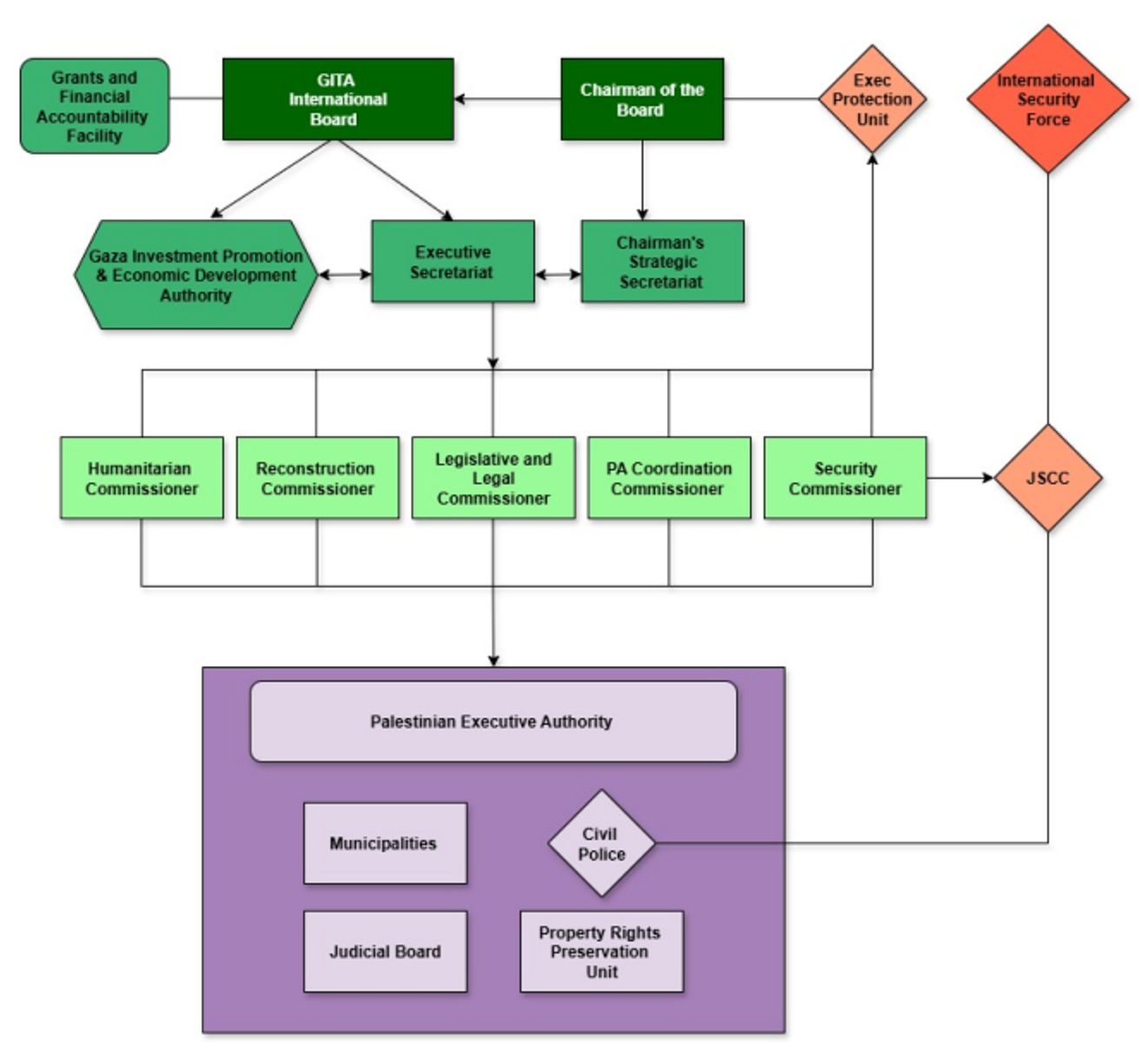
Gaza International Transitional Authority proposed structure

The proposed authority would be the "supreme political and legal authority" in the Gaza Strip. The Palestinian Authority would be able to appoint a co-ordination commissioner to liaise with the transitional authority. Hamas would be disarmed and would play no role in the administration of the Gaza Strip.

=== International Board ===
The authority would be led by a Gaza International Board which could include representatives from the United Nations, the international community, and Palestinian civil society. The board would be able to issue binding decisions, approve legislation, make appointments, and provide strategic direction to the authority. The work of the Chairman would be supported by a Chairman's Strategic Secretariat of up to 25 members and the authority as a whole would be supported by an Executive Secretariat.

=== Oversight Commissioners ===
The authority would appoint five Oversight Commissioners to oversee humanitarian affairs, reconstruction, legislation & legal affairs, security, relations with the Palestinian Authority.

=== Executive Authority ===
Responsibility for the day-to-day governance and service delivery in the Gaza Strip would be undertaken by the Executive Authority, with a committee of independent Palestinian technocrats leading health, education, finance, infrastructure, judiciary, and welfare ministries led by a Chief Executive appointed by the Board.

=== Local government ===
The Gaza Strip is divided into five governorates; Gaza, Khan Yunis, North Gaza, Deir al-Balah and Rafah which are further divided into 25 municipalities. Under the proposals, local-level services would continue to be provided by the municipalities, with mayors and municipal administrators nominated by the Executive Authority. Palestinian refugee camps in the Gaza Strip are managed by the United Nations Relief and Works Agency for Palestine Refugees in the Near East.

=== Property Rights Unit ===
Under the proposals, the Palestinian population of the Gaza Strip would not be displaced and would be able to remain within the territory, with the authority establishing a Property Rights Unit to ensure people who temporarily leave Gaza can return and retain their property rights.

=== Judiciary ===
An independent judicial system would be put in place and is to be overseen by a Judicial Board led by an Arab jurist.

== Security and law enforcement ==
Under the proposal, a multinational peacekeeping force and a locally recruited civilian police force would be deployed into the Gaza Strip, accompanied by a withdrawal of the Israeli armed forces from the territory.

=== International Stabilization Force ===
An Arab-led multinational peacekeeping force, the International Stabilization Force, would be deployed to provide strategic stability and operational protection in Gaza during the transitional period. The IDF could be withdrawn from most of the Gaza Strip once the International Stabilization Force has been deployed.

=== Executive Protection Unit ===
The Executive Protection Unit, staffed by "elite personnel from Arab and international contributors", would be established to provide security for the authority's leadership.

=== Civil police ===
A Gaza civil police force comprised "professionally vetted and nonpartisan" officers would maintain public order and protect civilians.

== Humanitarian aid and reconstruction ==
=== Humanitarian aid ===
Under the proposal, full aid is to be immediately sent into the Gaza Strip through United Nations agencies, the Red Crescent and other international institutions not associated with Israel or Palestine. The Rafah crossing would be opened in both directions, similar to its operation during the January–March 2025 ceasefire.

=== Reconstruction ===
Tony Blair's initial draft called for a Gaza Investment Promotion and Economic Development Authority (GIPEDA) to manage economic development in the Gaza Strip.

== See also ==
- Gaza Strip under Resolution 2803
- Board of Peace
- Israeli–Palestinian peace process
- Two-state solution
