= Gaza peace plan =

2025 Israel–Hamas ceasefire agreement

Comprehensive Plan to End the Gaza Conflict
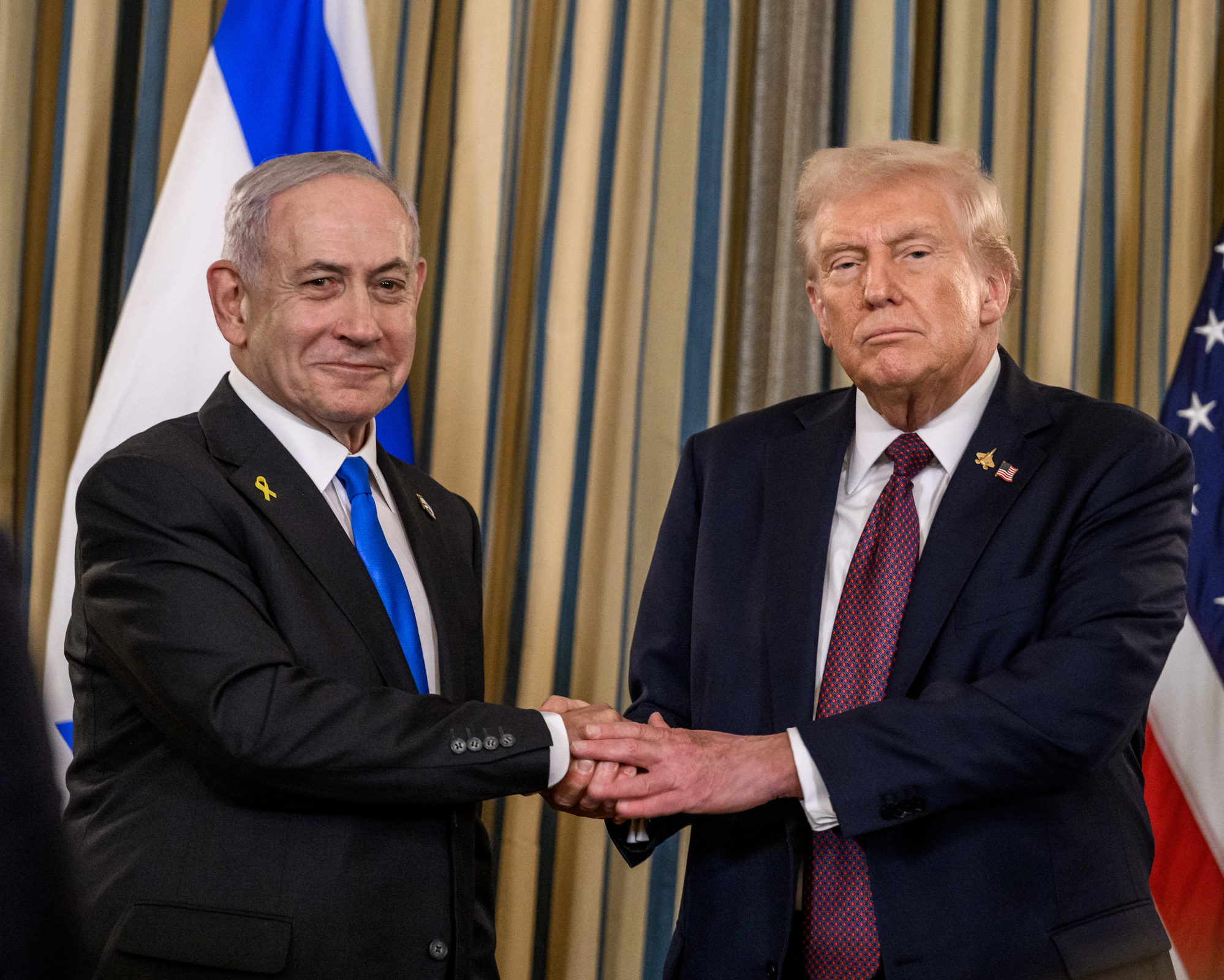
- Israeli prime minister Benjamin Netanyahu and U.S. president Donald Trump during the introduction of the proposal
- Context: Ending the Gaza war; Ending the Gaza war hostage crisis; Reconstructing the Gaza Strip; Israeli–Palestinian peace process
- Drafted: September 29, 2025
- Signed: October 9, 2025
- Effective: October 10, 2025
- Mediators: United States; Qatar; Turkey; Egypt
- Parties: Israel; Hamas
- Citations: Annex 1 to United Nations Security Council Resolution 2803

The Gaza peace plan, officially the Comprehensive Plan to End the Gaza Conflict, is a multilateral agreement between Israel and Hamas that aims to address the ongoing Gaza war, as well as the broader Middle Eastern crisis. Led by United States president Donald Trump, it was negotiated in consultation with many Arab and Muslim countries. The plan was announced by Trump on September 29, 2025, during a press conference at the White House alongside Israeli prime minister Benjamin Netanyahu. It was signed on October 9, coming into effect the following day, and was endorsed by the United Nations Security Council on November 17. Despite the agreement, hostilities have continued.

After the 2005 Israeli disengagement from the Gaza Strip, Hamas won elections in 2006 and formed a government, first alone and then in a grand coalition with Fatah, but later seized Gaza in 2007. Since then, repeated clashes with Israel have escalated into major conflicts, culminating in the October 7 attacks by Hamas in 2023, which triggered a large-scale Israeli military campaign that has been internationally recognized as genocidal. Interim ceasefires in late 2023 and early 2025 collapsed.

The Gaza peace plan calls for an immediate ceasefire, the return of all hostages, prisoner exchanges, the demilitarization of the Gaza Strip, the deployment of the International Stabilization Force, transitional governance by Palestinian technocrats under international supervision, large-scale reconstruction, and a conditional pathway toward acceptance of Palestinian self-determination and recognition of Palestinian statehood. The plan was met with support from many countries around the world, including France, Germany, Russia, Italy, Spain, the United Arab Emirates, Egypt, Turkey, Qatar, Jordan, Indonesia, Pakistan, Canada, and the United Kingdom. The State of Palestine was not involved in the negotiations, although the governing Palestinian Authority expressed support for the deal.

Prior to Trump's announcement of the plan, Hamas has maintained that it will not disarm without the establishment of an independent Palestinian state. Upon revealing the peace proposal, Trump gave Hamas a deadline of October 5, 2025, to accept. On October 3, in response to the proposal, Hamas agreed to release any remaining hostages in Gaza and to "hand over the administration of the Gaza Strip to a Palestinian body of independent technocrats", though it did not agree to disarm or to forgo influence in Gaza.

On October 8, Israel and Hamas reached an agreement to begin the first phase of the deal. Under this phase, all living hostages were to be released in exchange for 2,000 Palestinian prisoners, including 250 serving life sentences, within 72 hours of the withdrawal of Israeli forces to the predesignated Yellow Line. The first phase went into effect on October 10, 2025. There have been numerous violations since, including Israeli encroachment of the Gaza Strip beyond the agreed-upon Yellow Line, as well as the killing of more than 1,145 Palestinians. In October 2026, an independent United Nations commission concluded that Israel has continued its genocide despite the ceasefire agreement.

The commencement of the second phase of the plan was announced by US Special Envoy Steve Witkoff on 14 January 2026, but as of May 2026, negotiations have remained stalled due to repeated Israeli attacks since ‌the October ceasefire and disagreements over Hamas disarmament. On 6 July, Hamas proposed the resignation of its civil administration under the Gaza peace plan, breaking the limbo that had existed since January 2026.

== Background ==
Intermittent discussions are held by various parties and proposals put forward in an attempt to resolve the Israeli–Palestinian conflict through a peace process. Since the 1970s, there has been a parallel effort made to find terms upon which peace can be agreed to in both this conflict and the wider Arab–Israeli conflict. Notably, the Camp David Accords between Egypt and Israel included discussions on plans for Palestinian autonomy, but did not include any Palestinian representatives. The autonomy plan was not implemented, but its stipulations were represented to a large extent in the Oslo Accords.

Despite the failure of the peace process to produce a final agreement, the international consensus has for decades supported a two-state solution to the conflict, based on United Nations Security Council Resolution 242 and 338. This includes the establishment of an independent Palestinian state under the pre-1967 borders including East Jerusalem and a resolution to the refugee question based on the Palestinian right of return (in accordance with United Nations General Assembly Resolution 194, though Israel disputes this interpretation). This is in contrast to the current situation under the Oslo Accords in which the Palestinian territories are divided into areas of varying jurisdiction between Israeli military control and the Palestinian National Authority (PA), with the PA only having partial self-rule in Area A of the West Bank and in the Gaza Strip. A final settlement as stipulated by the Oslo Accords has yet to be reached.

=== Background to and beginning of the Gaza war ===
As part of the Israeli–Palestinian conflict, Gaza has been occupied by Israel since 1967 along with the West Bank and East Jerusalem. The International Court of Justice has ruled the occupation of Palestinian territory is illegal under international law. Following the 2005 Israeli disengagement from the Gaza Strip, control of the area was transferred to the Palestinian Authority (PA). Hamas, a Palestinian nationalist Islamist political and militant group, won the majority of seats in the Palestinian legislative election in January 2006. Israel frequently instated blockades on imports of goods to Gaza in 2006, including before and during the election; (Note: Wolfensohn, who was the special envoy of the Quartet at that time, makes the connection between the nonfulfillment of the border-crossings agreement and the election results. He also points out it was not the only reason of such election results.) while a blockade on exports cut off Gaza's existing industries (textiles, furniture, greenhouse berry farming) from foreign markets. The blockade was tightened after Hamas captured Israeli soldier Gilad Shalit in June 2006.

Hamas formed a government, first alone (early 2006) and then in a grand coalition with Fatah (March 2007) while still being the majority party. In a battle in June 2007, Hamas ousted the remaining Fatah officials and took sole control of the Gaza Strip. Meanwhile, in the West Bank, PA President Mahmoud Abbas (of Fatah) officially dismissed the government and, by a decree, formed a new one which did not include Hamas; this government was recognized by Israel as representing the PA. (Note: Israel does not recognize Palestine, or the PA, as an independent state. Per the Oslo II Accords, the PA can exercise limited powers in selected areas of the West Bank.) Hamas's takeover led Israel and Egypt to impose a blockade on Gaza, also in response to the thousands of rockets and mortar Hamas fired into Israeli territory; the number of munitions fired by Israel on Gaza remained consistently higher in 2006 than the number of munitions fired from Gaza on Israeli territory. Over the years, Israel and Hamas have engaged in several conflicts, including in 2006, 2008-2009, 2012, 2014 and 2021 (of which at least the first three were prompted by Israel either assassinating a Palestinian militant leader in Gaza or sending foot soldiers into Gaza); during these conflicts Hamas intensified its rocket attacks against Israel, and Israel attacked the Gaza Strip with aerial bombing and artillery shelling.

In October 2023, Hamas launched the October 7 attacks infiltrating Israel from Gaza via multiple routes. The attack began with thousands of rockets fired into Israel and was followed by massacres in multiple border towns, kibbutzim and at the Nova music festival. The attack killed 1,195 people, mostly civilians. Hamas militants also took around 251 hostages and captives. The assault prompted significant Israeli military retaliation, escalating into the Gaza war, which involved a large-scale invasion and bombardment of the Gaza Strip by the Israel Defense Forces (IDF). More than 68,000 Palestinians have been killed in the conflict, mostly civilians. A wide scholarly consensus has concluded that Israel's conduct during the war amounts to genocide in Gaza. (Note: See Gaza genocide § Academic and legal discourse)

=== November 2023 ceasefire ===
On November 24, 2023, after a long fighting period between Israel and Hamas, a ceasefire was achieved due to efforts of Qatar, Egypt, and the United States. At first the ceasefire was meant to last 4 days with the release of 50 Israeli hostages and 150 Palestinian prisoners, while more humanitarian aid was sent into Gaza. The ceasefire was extended twice based on further hostage releases but ultimately ended on December 1 after both sides accused each other of violations.

=== January 2025: second ceasefire starts ===
On January 19, 2025, another ceasefire between Israel and Hamas began, after an agreement reached on January 15 following months of negotiation mediated once again by the United States, Qatar, and Egypt. The ceasefire had three stages; the first stage saw the release of 33 Israeli hostages in exchange for about 1,900 Palestinian prisoners. During that time Israeli troops withdrew from populated areas in Gaza, while humanitarian aid was sent in along with displaced Palestinians returning home. During the first stage of the ceasefire, talks were supposed to begin between both parties about the specifics of a more permanent cessation of hostilities in the second and third stages. In the second stage, all living hostages would have been released by Hamas, and Israel would have released more Palestinian prisoners and completely withdraw its forces from Gaza. The third stage would involve, among others, an exchange of the bodies of dead hostages for the bodies of dead Palestinians.

The terms of the second and third stage were written into the agreement, but the agreement nevertheless said that talks will continue on the details of the second and third stage.

Hamas wanted the agreement to guarantee that the second and third stage will actually happen; and that, until then, the initial ceasefire will remain in force. Israel wanted the agreement to say that mediators (but not necessarily Hamas or Israel) will make every effort that talks about the details of the second and third stage will continue; in case they do not continue, the initial ceasefire, and all other terms of the first stage, would automatically expire after six weeks.

According to information about the contents of the January 2025 agreement published by the Israeli media, the final text of the agreement was based on the Israeli proposal, including the mechanism allowing the ceasefire to expire. This led pro-Israeli commenters to argue that Israel did not violate the ceasefire when it resumed the war in March 2025.

On January 20, 2025, U.S. President Joe Biden's presidential term ended, and he left completion of the ceasefire agreement in the hands of his successor, Donald Trump. Both Trump and Israeli Prime Minister Benjamin Netanyahu lead political parties described as right-wing, and though the two leaders had disagreements, Trump was seen at the time as more likely to favor Israel and give it permission to do as it pleased with Palestinian territory.

=== February 2025 Gaza Strip proposal ===
On February 4, 2025, United States president Donald Trump proposed a US takeover of the Gaza Strip and the relocation of its Palestinian inhabitants. Officially known as the Gaza Reconstitution, Economic Acceleration and Transformation Trust (or GREAT Trust), the proposal was announced by Trump during a press conference between him and Israeli prime minister Benjamin Netanyahu, and occurred during a ceasefire in the Gaza war, fought between Israel and Hamas-led Palestinian militants. Trump expressed his vision to redevelop the territory into the "Riviera of the Middle East".

The proposal called for the forced displacement of approximately two million Palestinians to neighboring lands, and would also have required the removal of over 50 million tonnes of debris and unexploded ordnance. When asked how the territory would be acquired, Trump claimed the US would "take it". The proposal received negative receptions from several nations and organizations, contrasting with strong support from Netanyahu.

=== March 2025: second ceasefire collapses ===
After completion of the agreement's first phase, Israel proposed extending the first stage. Hamas rejected this saying the ceasefire should proceed to the second phase as originally agreed. On March 18, 2025, Israel launched a surprise attack on the Gaza Strip, ending the ceasefire. The United States and Israel blamed Hamas for the collapse of the ceasefire by refusing to release additional hostages while Hamas accused Israel of causing the collapse of the ceasefire.

=== September 2025 proposal and subsequent statements ===
White House proposal on September 29, 2025

At the White House press conference on September 29, 2025, U.S. president Donald Trump stated that the United States would play an active role in ensuring Israel's security following a new ceasefire agreement. He emphasized that if Hamas accepted the deal, all hostages, both living and deceased, would be released almost immediately. Trump also expressed his intention to end the war and noted that he was "hearing that Hamas wants to get this done".

Trump stated that Israel withdrew from Gaza in 2005 in an effort to promote peace, stating, "They said, You take it. This is our contribution to peace. But that didn't work out." Trump further mentioned that during his meeting with Israeli prime minister Benjamin Netanyahu, Netanyahu had clearly opposed the establishment of a Palestinian state and criticized other countries that had "foolishly" recognized one. He added that Israel and other nations were "beyond very close" to reaching a deal to end the war, thanking Netanyahu for his efforts. Trump reiterated that the agreement would involve Arab countries and could lead to broader peace in the Middle East.

Trump called the 20-point plan an "extremely fair proposal" and urged Hamas to accept it, expressing confidence that a positive response would be forthcoming, though he affirmed Israel's right to act if Hamas rejected the deal. On October 3, 2025, Trump gave Hamas a deadline of October 5, 2025, 18:00 Washington D.C. time (22:00 GMT), to accept the proposed agreement. In an interview to CNN the next day, Trump threatened Hamas, stating that if it refused to give up control of Gaza it would face "complete obliteration".

On October 8, in a Fox News interview, Trump said there was a "set of circumstances" that enabled the agreement, including Israeli and American strikes in Iran aimed at destroying its nuclear program. The immediate triggering event that reportedly caused Trump to force Israel to end the war was the Israeli attack on Doha, which violated Qatar's territorial integrity in a failed attempt to kill Hamas negotiators. European and Arab countries also strongly backed the proposal, with Arab countries having close commercial and diplomatic ties to Trump, more European countries promising to recognize Palestine as a state, and increasing global opinion criticising the Gaza genocide. Due to domestic political differences, Trump felt freer to put pressure on Israel, and in the months of his second term, Israel had achieved all of its major military objectives in Iran, Lebanon, and Gaza.

Several commenters argued that the timing of the deal was motivated by Trump's desire to win a Nobel Peace Prize. The 2025 prize, announced on October 10, 2025, was not awarded to Trump. It was awarded to María Corina Machado, a Venezuelan opposition leader, who said she was grateful for what Trump was doing "around the world for peace". Machado also stated she believes Trump "absolutely" deserves a Nobel Peace Prize of his own for "incredible events that are taking place currently in the world"; according to CNN, she was "referring to Trump's efforts to broker peace in the Middle East". Since January 2025, Trump has expressed his wish to be awarded the prize. Political scientist Scott Lucas opined that Trump was "desperate" to obtain the prize because former US president Barack Obama won the 2009 prize. Trump justified his qualification for the prize by claiming to have "ended seven wars". On October 9, Nina Graeger of Peace Research Institute Oslo argued that Trump had "not yet made a substantial enough contribution to peace to win the prize". She stated that it was "too early" to judge if Trump's involvement in the Gaza war would "lead to lasting peace". Graeger stated that Trump's withdrawals from international agreements, his proposed acquisition of Greenland, and his "infringements on basic democratic rights" in the US weakened his case.

== Outline ==
The plan's 20 points are as follows:

1. Gaza will be a deradicalized terror-free zone that does not pose a threat to its neighbors.
2. Gaza will be redeveloped for the benefit of the people of Gaza, who have suffered more than enough.
3. If both sides agree to this proposal, the war will immediately end. Israeli forces will withdraw to the agreed upon line to prepare for a hostage release. During this time, all military operations, including aerial and artillery bombardment, will be suspended, and battle lines will remain frozen until conditions are met for the complete staged withdrawal.
4. Within 72 hours of Israel publicly accepting this agreement, all hostages, alive and deceased, will be returned.
5. Once all hostages are released, Israel will release 250 life sentence prisoners plus 1700 Gazans who were detained after October 7, 2023, including all women and children detained in that context. For every Israeli hostage whose remains are released, Israel will release the remains of 15 deceased Gazans.
6. Once all hostages are returned, Hamas members who commit to peaceful co-existence and to decommission their weapons will be given amnesty. Members of Hamas who wish to leave Gaza will be provided safe passage to receiving countries.
7. Upon acceptance of this agreement, full aid will be immediately sent into the Gaza Strip. At a minimum, aid quantities will be consistent with what was included in the January 19, 2025, agreement regarding humanitarian aid, including rehabilitation of infrastructure (water, electricity, sewage), rehabilitation of hospitals and bakeries, and entry of necessary equipment to remove rubble and open roads.
8. Entry of distribution and aid in the Gaza Strip will proceed without interference from the two parties through the United Nations and its agencies, and the Red Crescent, in addition to other international institutions not associated in any manner with either party. Opening the Rafah crossing in both directions will be subject to the same mechanism implemented under the January 19, 2025, agreement.
9. Gaza will be governed under the temporary transitional governance of a technocratic, apolitical Palestinian committee, responsible for delivering the day-to-day running of public services and municipalities for the people in Gaza. This committee will be made up of qualified Palestinians and international experts, with oversight and supervision by a new international transitional body, the "Board of Peace", which will be headed and chaired by President Donald J. Trump, with other members and heads of State to be announced, including former prime minister Tony Blair. This body will set the framework and handle the funding for the redevelopment of Gaza until such time as the Palestinian Authority has completed its reform program, as outlined in various proposals, including President Trump's peace plan in 2020 and the Saudi-French proposal, and can securely and effectively take back control of Gaza. This body will call on best international standards to create modern and efficient governance that serves the people of Gaza and is conducive to attracting investment.
10. A Trump economic development plan to rebuild and energize Gaza will be created by convening a panel of experts who have helped birth some of the thriving modern miracle cities in the Middle East. Many thoughtful investment proposals and exciting development ideas have been crafted by well-meaning international groups, and will be considered to synthesize the security and governance frameworks to attract and facilitate these investments that will create jobs, opportunity, and hope for future Gaza.
11. A special economic zone will be established with preferred tariff and access rates to be negotiated with participating countries.
12. No one will be forced to leave Gaza, and those who wish to leave will be free to do so and free to return. We will encourage people to stay and offer them the opportunity to build a better Gaza.
13. Hamas and other factions agree to not have any role in the governance of Gaza, directly, indirectly, or in any form. All military, terror, and offensive infrastructure, including tunnels and weapon production facilities, will be destroyed and not rebuilt. There will be a process of demilitarization of Gaza under the supervision of independent monitors, which will include placing weapons permanently beyond use through an agreed process of decommissioning, and supported by an internationally funded buy back and reintegration program all verified by the independent monitors. New Gaza will be fully committed to building a prosperous economy and to peaceful coexistence with their neighbors.
14. A guarantee will be provided by regional partners to ensure that Hamas, and the factions, comply with their obligations and that New Gaza poses no threat to its neighbors or its people.
15. The United States will work with Arab and international partners to develop a temporary International Stabilization Force (ISF) to immediately deploy in Gaza. The ISF will train and provide support to vetted Palestinian police forces in Gaza, and will consult with Jordan and Egypt who have extensive experience in this field. This force will be the long-term internal security solution. The ISF will work with Israel and Egypt to help secure border areas, along with newly trained Palestinian police forces. It is critical to prevent munitions from entering Gaza and to facilitate the rapid and secure flow of goods to rebuild and revitalize Gaza. A deconfliction mechanism will be agreed upon by the parties.
16. Israel will not occupy or annex Gaza. As the ISF establishes control and stability, the Israel Defense Forces (IDF) will withdraw based on standards, milestones, and timeframes linked to demilitarization that will be agreed upon between the IDF, ISF, the guarantors, and the United States, with the objective of a secure Gaza that no longer poses a threat to Israel, Egypt, or its citizens. Practically, the IDF will progressively hand over the Gaza territory it occupies to the ISF according to an agreement they will make with the transitional authority until they are withdrawn completely from Gaza, save for a security perimeter presence that will remain until Gaza is properly secure from any resurgent terror threat.
17. In the event Hamas delays or rejects this proposal, the above, including the scaled-up aid operation, will proceed in the terror-free areas handed over from the IDF to the ISF.
18. An interfaith dialogue process will be established based on the values of tolerance and peaceful co-existence to try and change mindsets and narratives of Palestinians and Israelis by emphasizing the benefits that can be derived from peace.
19. While Gaza re-development advances and when the PA reform program is faithfully carried out, the conditions may finally be in place for a credible pathway to Palestinian self-determination and statehood, which we recognize as the aspiration of the Palestinian people.
20. The United States will establish a dialogue between Israel and the Palestinians to agree on a political horizon for peaceful and prosperous co-existence.

== Components ==
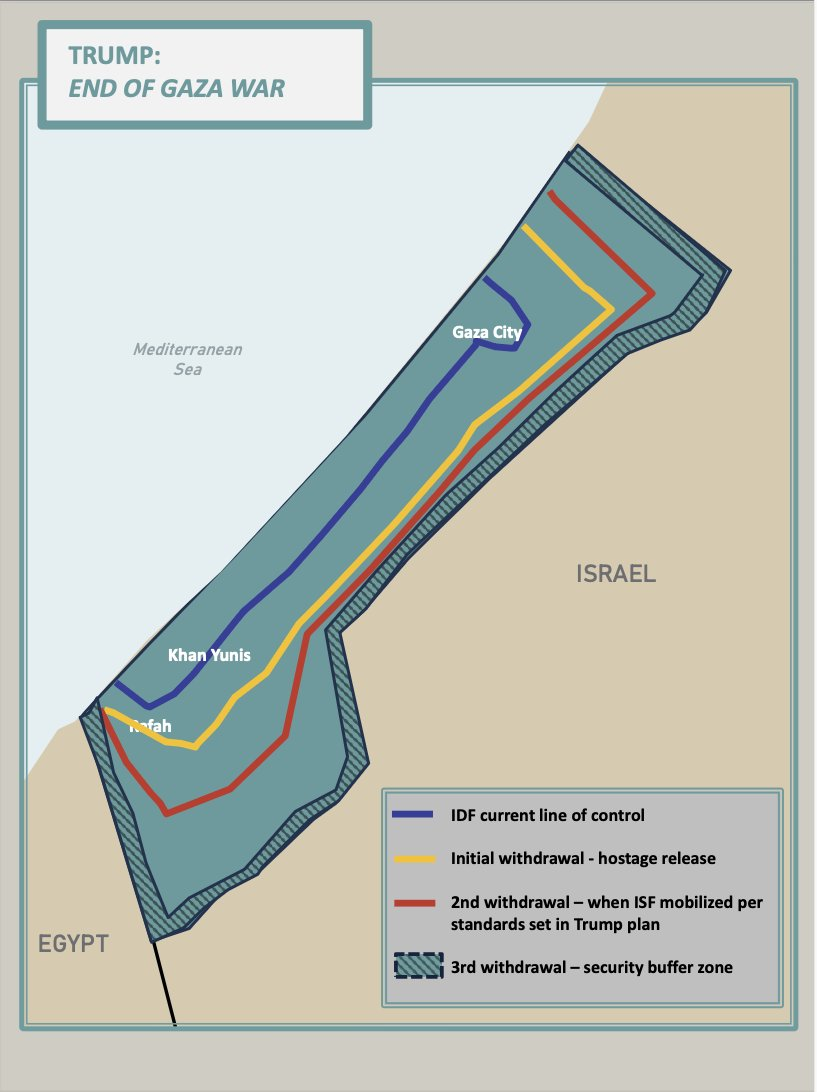
Map of the Trump plan for the ending of the Gaza war (more detailed version of the phase one withdrawal line shown on map below)

=== Phase 1: immediate ceasefire and humanitarian actions ===
The plan mandated an immediate cessation of hostilities, with all military operations suspended and frontlines frozen. All Israeli hostages, alive and deceased, were to be returned within 72 hours. Palestinian prisoners were to be released proportionally, including 250 life sentence prisoners and 1,700 individuals arrested since the war began. For every Israeli hostage whose remains are released, Israel will release the remains of 15 deceased Gazans.

=== Phase 2: demilitarization, security measures, governance and reconstruction ===
The proposed strategy includes the destruction of Hamas's offensive weaponry, such as tunnels and military infrastructure, to neutralize their capacity for further violence. The statement says that Gaza will be "a de-radicalized terror-free zone that does not pose a threat to its neighbors". It also offers amnesty to Hamas members who commit to peaceful coexistence, with safe passage provided for those opting for exile. Additionally, a temporary international stabilization force, composed of U.S., Arab, and European personnel, would be deployed to oversee security and facilitate the training of a Palestinian police force, ensuring long-term stability and peace.

A National Committee for the Administration of Gaza, led by Palestinian technocrats and supported by an international Board of Peace, is planned to be established in to manage day-to-day governance and oversee the rebuilding and repair of infrastructure. Humanitarian aid is to be delivered without interference, with international organizations such as the United Nations and the Red Crescent overseeing its distribution to ensure fairness and efficiency. Additionally, efforts are planned to encourage Palestinians to remain in Gaza, offering support to those choosing to stay and rebuild their communities.

On January 21, 2026, during the World Economic Forum in Davos, President Donald Trump stated that Hamas must disarm and release all remaining hostage remains "within weeks" or be "blown away very quickly". This ultimatum was issued a day before the formal signing ceremony for the Board of Peace, a Trump-chaired international organization established to oversee the reconstruction and governance of Gaza , potentially serving as an alternative to United Nations mediation.

=== Recognition of Palestinian statehood ===
The strategy includes the acknowledgment of Palestine as a state, contingent upon successful reconstruction efforts and necessary reforms within the Palestinian Authority. To pave the way for long-term peace, a dialogue would be initiated between Israel and the Palestinians to establish a political framework that promotes peaceful coexistence and mutual understanding. Although the plan recognizes the Palestinian state as a possibility that is "the aspiration of the Palestinian people", it does not say that the United States would recognize Palestine as a state.

== Negotiations ==
=== Phase one (partial implementation) ===
On September 30, Donald Trump's proposal was forwarded to Hamas. Trump stated that the group had "three or four days" to respond to the plan. Hamas announced that they were studying the proposal "in good faith".

On October 2, reports emerged that Hamas's political leadership in Qatar were open to accepting the proposed deal and asked for additional clauses for international guarantees concerning Israel's withdrawal from the Gaza Strip and the safety of its leadership. However, Hamas's leader in the Gaza Strip itself, Izz al-Din al-Haddad, reportedly had objections to the proposal. An investigation by the New York Times found widespread support for the plan amongst civilians in the Gaza Strip, with many urging Hamas to accept the deal. The Egyptian and Qatari governments continued working to convince Hamas to accept the proposal. Hamas pushed to secure the release of Marwan Barghouti, but Israel refused.

On October 3, Trump gave Hamas a deadline of Sunday October 5, 2025, 22:00 GMT, to accept the proposed deal. Later that day, Hamas announced that they would release all Israeli hostages, living and deceased, and they expressed willingness to negotiate on Trump's proposed plan, though they did not agree to disarm or forgo influence in Gaza. Trump responded by saying that he believed that Hamas was "ready for lasting peace", and urged Israel to "immediately stop bombing Gaza" to allow for the safe release of hostages. Despite Trump's request for it to stop, Israel continued its bombing up to October 5, killing 70 Palestinians, stating, in one of those strikes, that it targeted a Hamas militant who posed a threat to its forces, expressing regret for harm to uninvolved civilians, and saying it "works to mitigate harm to uninvolved civilians as much as possible".

On October 4, Israeli prime minister Benjamin Netanyahu ordered the armed forces to halt their offensive in Gaza City in response to Trump's demands. It was reported that talks between Palestinian factions, including Hamas, regarding the future governance of Gaza would take place in Cairo. US Special Envoy to the Middle East, Steve Witkoff, and Jared Kushner were reported to be heading to Cairo to finalise the technical details of the hostage release and discuss the lasting peace deal. Indirect talks between Israel and Hamas were planned to take place over the next few days in Egypt. Later that evening, Trump posted on social media that Israel "has agreed to the initial withdrawal line" and that when Hamas confirms, a ceasefire will "be IMMEDIATELY effective".

On October 5, it was reported that the talks would be held in Sharm el Sheikh. The Israeli delegation would be led by Strategic Affairs Minister Ron Dermer and the Hamas delegation led by Khalil Al-Hayya. Trump stated that the talks may take "a couple of days" and called for "everyone to move fast", adding, "I am told that the first phase should be completed this week."

On October 6, negotiators from Israel and Hamas began indirect talks in Sharm el-Sheikh, Egypt to discuss the release of the remaining Israeli hostages and Palestinian prisoner exchange mediated by Egyptian, Qatari, Turkish and US officials. The talks lasted for around four hours and ended on a positive note, with a road map agreed for further talks the following day.

Two rounds of negotiations were held on October 7, with sources describing "progress" being made. US envoys Jared Kushner and Steve Witkoff and Qatari prime minister Mohammed bin Abdulrahman bin Jassim Al Thani were expected to join the talks on October 8. A five-point agenda for further talks, covering ending the war, prisoner and hostage exchange, Israeli withdrawal, humanitarian assistance and post-war was agreed.

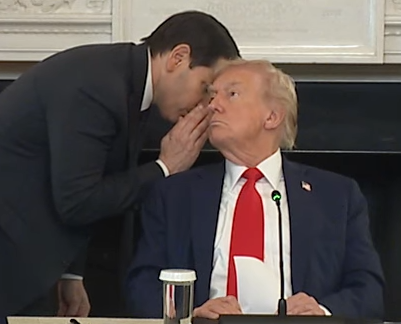
Secretary Rubio briefing President Trump that Israel and Hamas have signed off on the peace deal; October 8, 2025

On October 8, Trump was handed a handwritten note from secretary of state Marco Rubio during a live television appearance stating an agreement was "very close" and that he would need to "approve a Truth social post soon so you can announce deal first". Shortly thereafter, reports emerged that an agreement had been reached and would be signed the following day. Trump subsequently confirmed that an agreement on the first phase of the deal had been approved by both sides, posting on social media that, "I am very proud to announce that Israel and Hamas have both signed off on the first Phase of our Peace Plan." The agreement was signed in Egypt at 12 noon local time on October 9. Hostages were to be freed over the weekend or early the following week, with Hamas releasing 20 living hostages in exchange for Israel's release of 2,000 Palestinian prisoners, including 250 serving life sentences and 1,700 prisoners that had been detained since the war began.

On October 13, Hamas released the 20 living hostages and Israel began to release the Palestinian prisoners.

=== Phase two (proposed) ===
Vice president of the Palestinian Authority, Hussein al-Sheikh, met with Tony Blair on October 12, 2025, to discuss the ceasefire and reconstruction in the Gaza Strip.

An international summit on the next phase of the peace plan was convened on October 13 in Sharm El Shaikh, Egypt. Prior to the summit, Trump stated that negotiations for phase two of the peace plan had begun.

On October 14, Egyptian foreign minister Badr Abdelatty stated that fifteen Palestinian technocrats had been chosen to lead a post-war interim administration for the Gaza Strip. He added that the list had been agreed by all Palestinian factions, including Hamas, and had been vetted by Israel.

On October 24, Hamas announced it is willing to relinquish control of the Gaza Strip. On November 8, vice-president of the Palestinian Authority, Hussein al-Sheikh, stated that the Palestinian Authority and Hamas had agreed that any future Palestinian technical government for the Gaza Strip would be led by a minister suggested by the Palestinian Authority with health minister and former mayor of Gaza, Maged Abu Ramadan, being named as a possible candidate.

US Special Envoy to the Middle East, Steve Witkoff, and Trump adviser Jared Kushner arrived in Israel on October 20 and were joined by US vice-president JD Vance the following day.

The European Union together with the Palestinian Authority convened the first summit of the newly formed "Palestine Donor Group" in Brussels on November 20.

Palestinian factions including Hamas, Islamic Jihad, Popular Front, Democratic Front, Popular Resistance Committees, National Initiative, and the Democratic Reform Movement (Dahlan Movement) started meeting in Cairo on November 24 to discuss a draft "protocol of action of the international force".

On November 17, the UN Security Council approved a resolution proposed by the United States regarding a transitional government and the establishment of an International Stabilization Force (ISF) in Gaza.

=== 2026 developments ===
A disarmament plan was presented to Hamas by the Board of Peace in March 2026. In April, Israel stated they will not move forward without progress on Hamas disarmament. A Hamas spokesperson rejected the plan and said it was "unacceptable" for Israel to demand disarmament from them in a "crude manner" and that it was a "double standard" to only ask concessions from Palestineans. They accused Nickolay Mladenov of having bias towards Israel and added that they will not discuss the second phase unless Israel first fully implements the terms of the first phase, which includes a hostage-prisoner exchange, increased humanitarian aid to the Gaza Strip, and the partial withdrawal of Israeli forces. They also requested strong guarantees to ensure an independent sovereign Palestinian state.

On 5 May 2026, The Times of Israel reported a letter from Mladenov that was addressed to the head of the Palestinian technocratic government. The document suggested the "Board of Peace" did not intend to hold Israel to the terms of the ceasefire if Hamas won't accept the panel's proposed disarmament framework. Israel has reportedly carried out almost daily strikes throughout Gaza since the ceasefire and had justified them by claiming they were strikes against "imminent" threats to their forces.

A May 2026 report from The Jerusalem Post said that Israel had told Mladenov that they will not withdraw from the Yellow Line within Gaza. An Israeli security source, speaking to KAN News, stated that if Hamas continues to not disarm, then the IDF will restart the fighting in Gaza to "complete their mission".

== Implementation ==
The first part of the peace plan, titled the "Implementation Steps for President Trump's Proposal for a Comprehensive End of Gaza War", was signed by Israel and Hamas on October 9, 2025, in Sharm el Sheikh, Egypt. The agreed to text was as follows:

Implementation Steps for President Trump's Proposal for a "Comprehensive End of Gaza War"

Implementation steps:

1. President Trump announces the end to the war in the Gaza Strip, and that the parties have agreed to implement the necessary steps to that end.
2. The war will immediately end upon the approval of the Israeli government. All military operations, including aerial and artillery bombardment and targeting operations will be suspended. During the 72-hour period, aerial surveillance will be suspended over the areas which IDF forces have withdrawn from.
3. Immediate commencement of full entry of humanitarian aid and relief as determined in the Proposal, and at a minimum in consistence with the 19 January 2025 agreement regarding humanitarian aid. Humanitarian aid and relief implementation steps are attached herewith.
4. The IDF will withdraw to the lines agreed upon, as per map X attached herewith, and this will be completed after President Trump's announcement and within 24 hours of Israeli government's approval. The IDF will not return to areas it has withdrawn from, as long as Hamas fully implements the agreement.
5. Within 72 hours of the withdrawal of Israeli forces, all Israeli hostages, living and deceased, held in Gaza will be released (list attached).
  1. As soon as the IDF completes the withdrawal, Hamas will commence investigating the status of the hostages and collect all information pertaining to them. Hamas will provide feedback on its findings through the information-sharing mechanism under 5.e below. Israel will provide information on the Palestinian prisoners and detainees from the Gaza Strip held in Israel.
  2. Within the 72 hours, Hamas will release all living hostages, including those held by the Palestinian factions in Gaza.
  3. Within the 72 hours, Hamas will release the remains of the deceased hostages in its possession and those in the possession of the Palestinian factions in Gaza.
  4. Hamas will share, within the 72 hours, all the information it obtained relating to any remaining deceased hostages through the information-sharing mechanism in paragraph (e) below. Israel will provide information on the remains of the deceased Gazans held by Israel.
  5. Establishment of an information-sharing mechanism between the two sides through the mediators and the ICRC, to exchange information and intelligence on any remaining deceased hostages that were not retrieved within the 72 hours or remains of Gazans held by Israel. The mechanism shall ensure that the remains of all the hostages are fully and safely exhumed and released. Hamas shall exert maximum effort to ensure the fulfillment of these commitments as soon as possible.
  6. As Hamas releases all the hostages, Israel will release in parallel the corresponding number of Palestinian prisoners as per the attached lists.
  7. The exchange of hostages and prisoners will be done according to the mechanism agreed upon through the mediators and through the ICRC without any public ceremonies or media coverage.
6. A task force will be formed of representatives from the United States, Qatar, Egypt, Turkey, and other countries agreed upon by the parties, to follow-up on the implementation with the two sides and coordinate with them.

=== Phase one agreed timeline ===
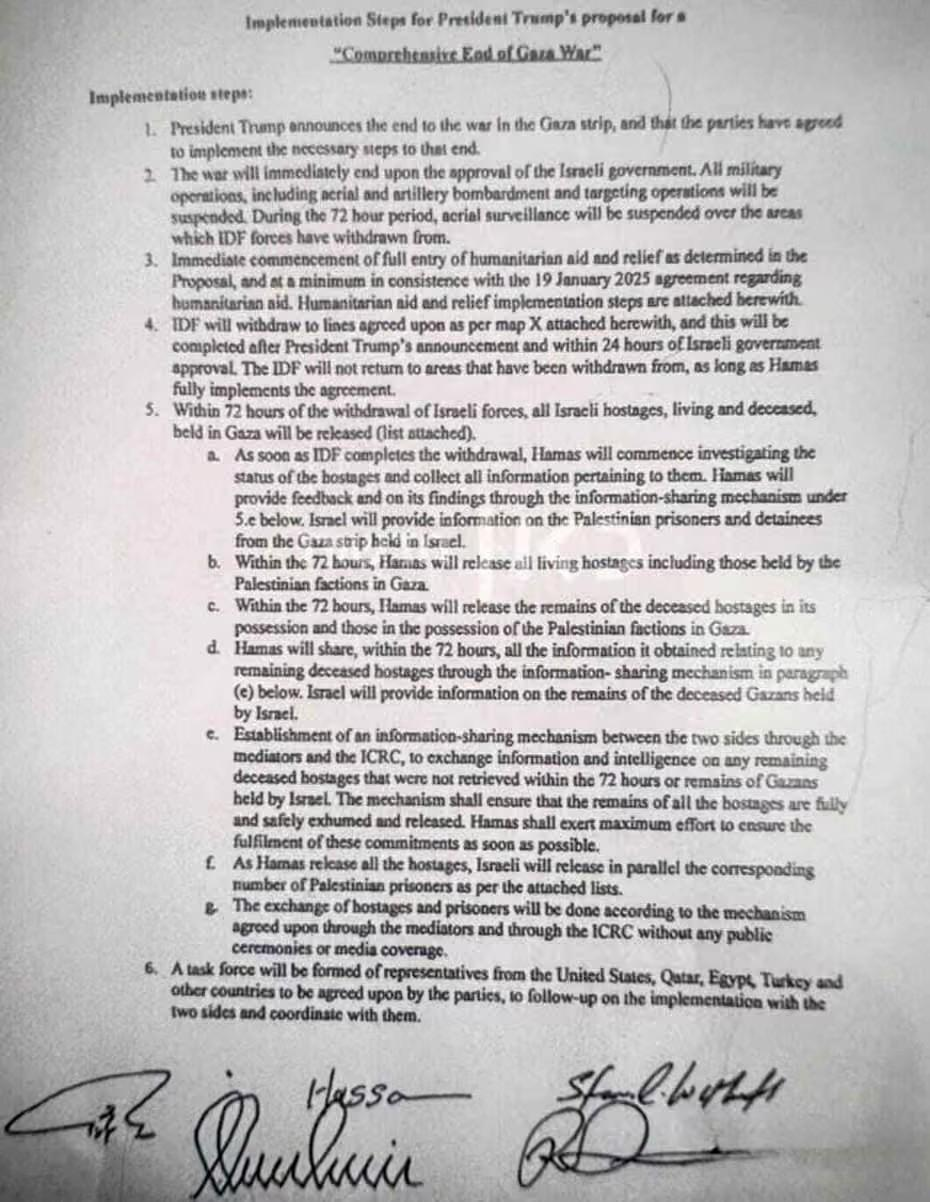
Implementation Steps for President Trump's Proposal for a Comprehensive End of Gaza War

The timeline is as follows:

- US president Donald Trump announces the end of the war in the Gaza Strip
- Hostilities will cease once the agreement is approved by the Israeli cabinet
- Entry of humanitarian aid into the Gaza Strip will commence upon the cessation of hostilities
- Israeli armed forces will commence withdrawing to the lines agreed upon approval of the agreement (the Yellow Line) with this process being completed within 24 hours
- All living hostages should be released within 72 hours of the completion of the withdrawal of Israeli forces
- All remains of deceased hostages within Hamas's possession should be returned within 72 hours of the completion of the withdrawal of Israeli forces
- Palestinian prisoners to be released in parallel with the release of Israeli hostages
- A task force including representatives from the United States, Qatar, Egypt, Turkey and other countries is to be formed to monitor on the implementation of the agreement.

=== Cessation of hostilities ===
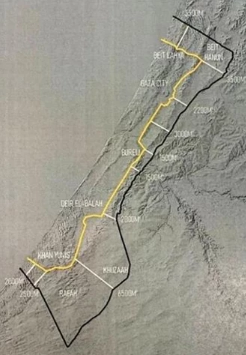
Phase one withdrawal line shown in yellow, called the Yellow Line

The Israeli cabinet approved the agreement in the early hours of October 10, 2025. Subsequently, the Israeli armed forces began withdrawing from parts of the Gaza Strip to agreed-upon deployment lines, also known as the Yellow Line. The withdrawal was completed at 12 noon local time on October 10, at which point the ceasefire formally came into effect. The United States began establishing a joint control centre under the leadership of Brad Cooper, head of US Central Command, to monitor the cessation of hostilities.

On October 11, Brad Cooper, Steve Witkoff, and Jared Kushner travelled into the Gaza Strip to verify Israel's compliance with the first phase of the agreement.

On October 12, Hamas announced it was prepared to transfer the 20 living hostages to Israel. In response, Netanyahu stated, "Israel is prepared and ready for the immediate reception of all our hostages." Israeli sources indicated they believed Hamas would release the hostages before midnight on Sunday so that they would be under Israeli care when Trump arrived in Israel on Monday morning. Coordinator for Hostages and Missing Persons Gal Hirsch said the most "realistic" time for the hostages' return is 6 or 7 a.m. on Monday, though there are reports they could return earlier. That evening, Trump declared that "The war is over" and that the Board of Peace and interim administration would be formed quickly.

=== Release of hostages ===
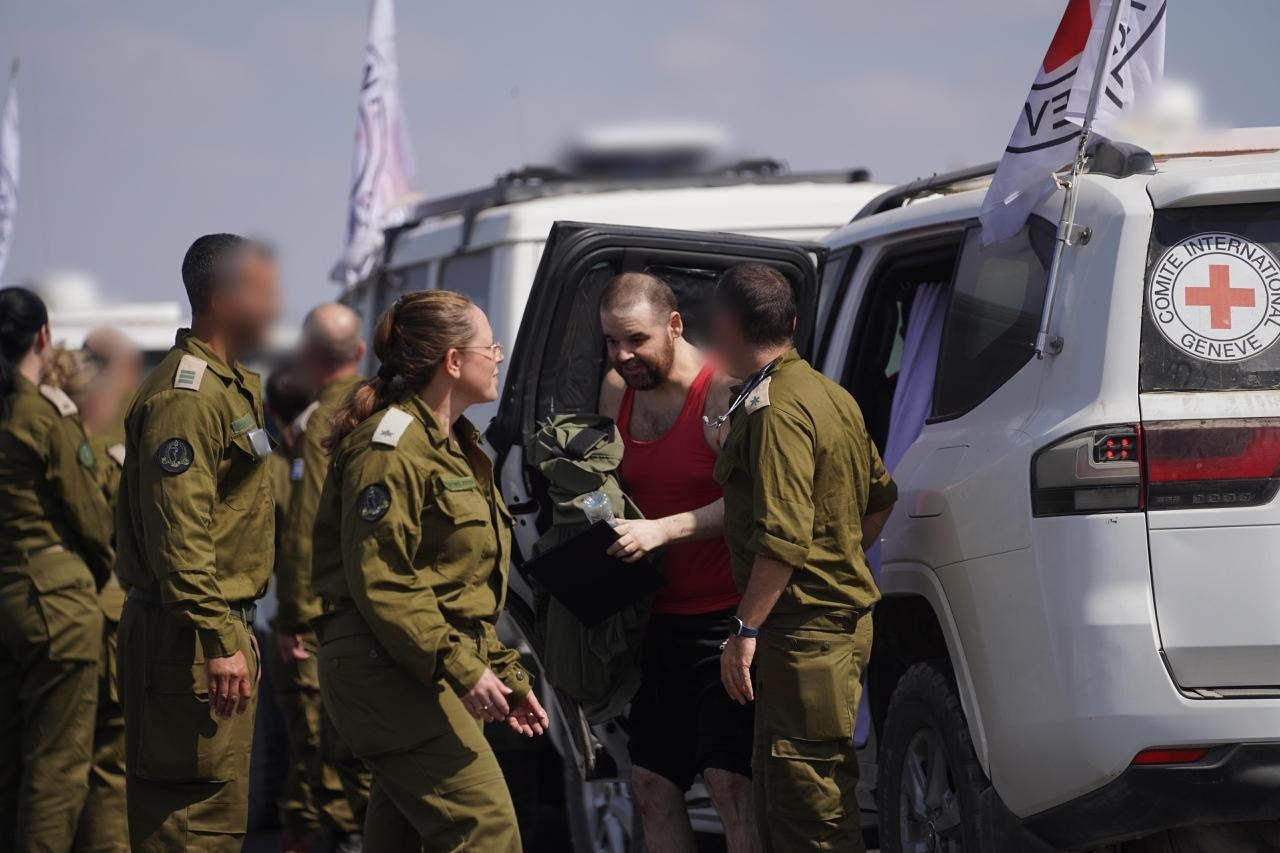
Eitan Horn being released to the Israel Defense Forces on October 13, 2025

On October 13 at 8 a.m., in Gaza City, Hamas released 7 hostages to the Red Cross and then into the custody of IDF troops. Around 11 a.m., in the southern Gaza Strip, Hamas released the additional 13 living hostages to the Red Cross and then into the custody of IDF troops. Hamas ultimately decided to return the remains of four of the dead hostages later on October 13, despite agreeing to release all 28. According to Israeli officials the released hostages were aged 22–48, and included a pair of twin brothers and IDF soldiers. Hamas permitted certain hostages to conduct video calls with their families shortly prior to their release. Following their release, the hostages were transported to medical facilities, including Sheba Medical Center in Tel Hashomer, for evaluation and treatment. They faced a range of health issues, including malnutrition, loss of muscle and fat, shrapnel injuries, burns, and other physical trauma. Some also experienced complications from overfeeding shortly before their release after months of starvation.

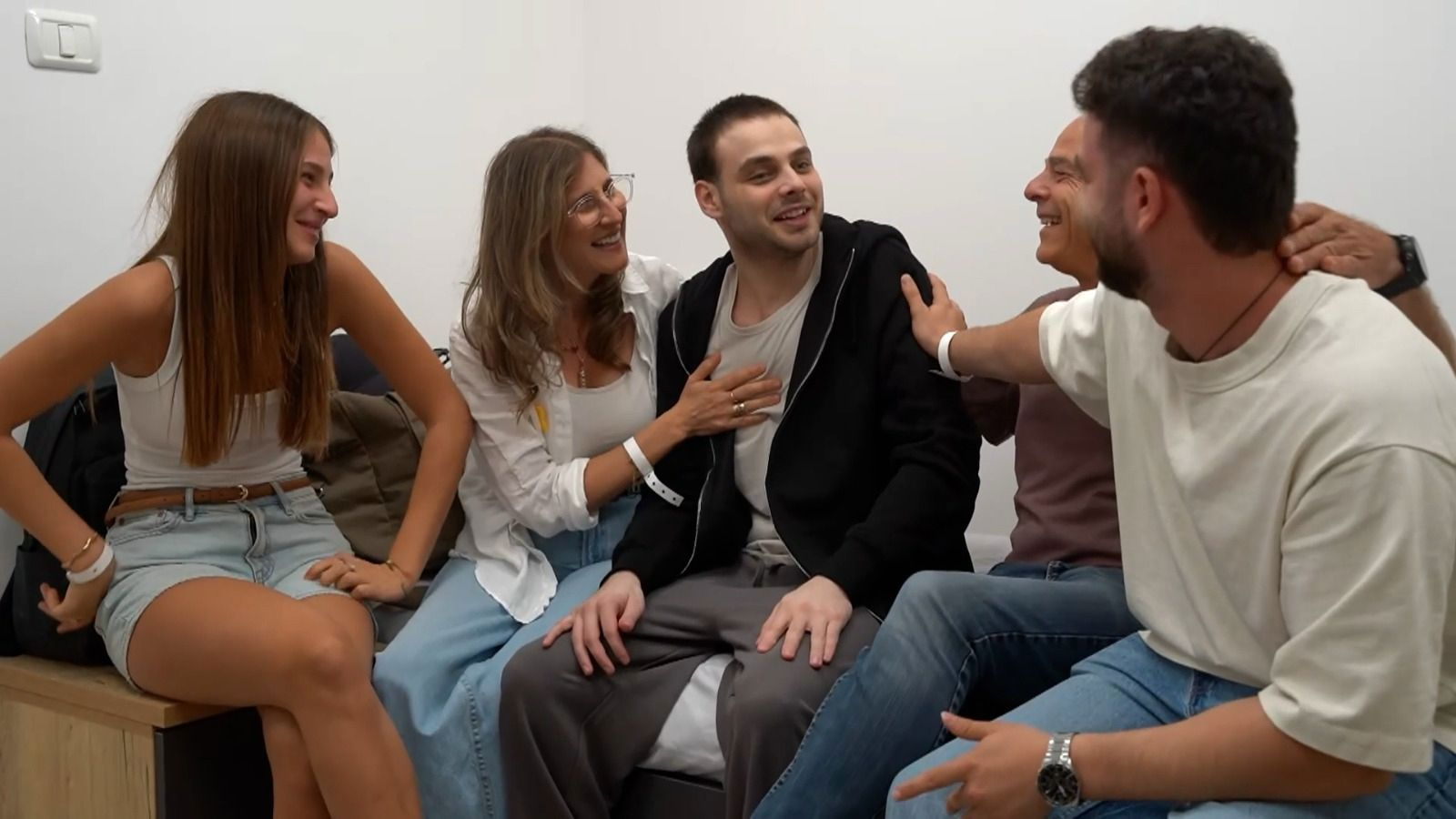
Former hostage Alon Ohel meets his family for the first time after his release from Hamas captivity, October 13, 2025.

Later on October 13, 2025, during a ceremony in Gaza, the Israel Defense Forces received the caskets containing the bodies of four deceased hostages and then brought the caskets out of Gaza and into Israel after crossing the Gaza-Israel border. The deceased hostages were reportedly aged between 22 and 53, and included a Nepalese agriculture student and an IDF soldier. On October 15, Israeli officials reported that one of the returned bodies was not that of a hostage.

As of October 25, Hamas had returned the remains of only 15 deceased hostages, while the remains of 13 others remained in its possession that it is obligated to return under the agreement. Trump issued a statement acknowledging that Hamas may not know the location of some remains, but noted that there are several to which the group has access and is nevertheless withholding. He warned Hamas that it would be held responsible if the ceasefire collapses and stated that he would closely monitor the group's compliance with the agreement over the next 48 hours.

On October 30, Hamas returned to Israel the remains of two deceased hostages, who were abducted from their homes and killed in Hamas captivity. Israeli authorities confirmed their identities the same day. As of that date, the remains of 11 additional deceased hostages were still being held in Gaza, and Israel said Hamas is "required to fulfill its commitments to the mediators and return them as part of the implementation of the agreement".

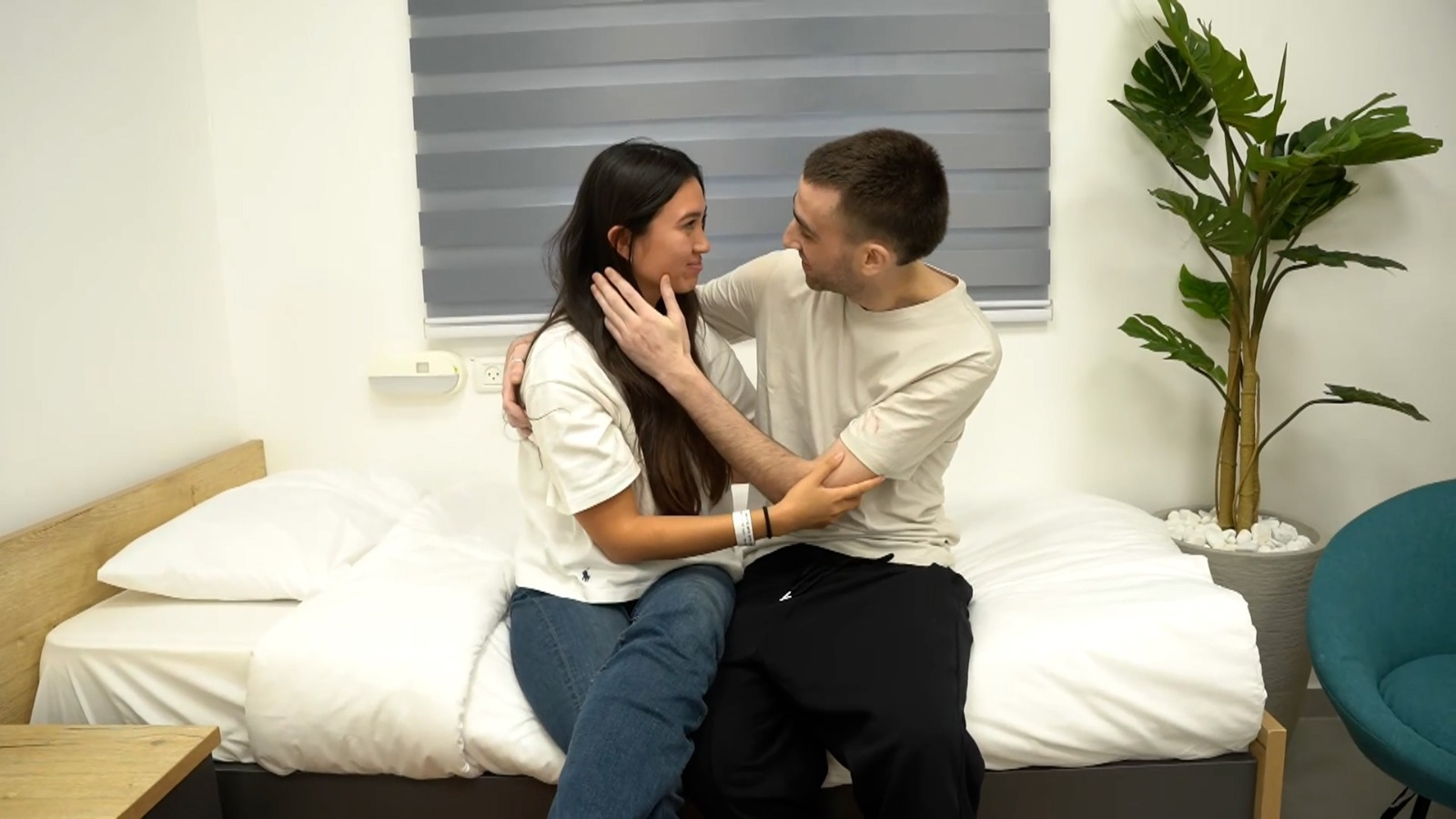
The first reunion between released hostage Avinatan Or and his partner, former hostage Noa Argamani, October 13, 2025

On November 2, Hamas returned the remains of three deceased hostages to Israel. These hostages, including Asaf Hamami and Omer Neutra, were soldiers who were abducted after being killed in combat during the October 7 attacks. As of that date, the remains of eight more deceased hostages were still being held in Gaza.

On November 4, Hamas transferred to Israel the remains of the hostage Itay Chen, a 7th Armored Brigade soldier killed in his tank near Nahal Oz on October 7 attacks. Chen was the last slain hostage with US citizenship still held in Gaza. As of that date, the bodies of seven more deceased hostages remained in the Strip.

On November 5, Hamas transferred to Israel the remains of the hostage Joshua Loitu Mollel, a 21-year-old Tanzanian agricultural intern abducted from Kibbutz Nahal Oz on October 7 attacks. As of that date, the bodies of six more deceased hostages remained in the Strip.

On November 7, Hamas transferred to Israel the remains of the hostage Lior Rudaeff, a 61‑year‑old the deputy security coordinator at Kibbutz Nir Yitzhak and a member of its civil‑defence squad, who was killed on the morning of October 7, 2023, during the militant attack, with his body subsequently abducted to Gaza. As of that date, the remains of five additional deceased hostages remained in the Strip.

On November 9, the remains of the hostage Hadar Goldin were returned to Israel, after more than 11 years in captivity by Hamas. He had been killed and abducted during the 2014 Gaza War on August 1, 2014, amid a humanitarian cease‑fire and subsequent tunnel attack. As of that date, the remains of four additional deceased hostages were still held in the Gaza Strip.

On November 13, the remains of one more Israeli hostage were handed over by Hamas to Israel.

On November 25, the remains of one more Israeli hostage were handed over by PIJ and Hamas to Israel.

On December 3, the remains of one more hostage were handed over by Hamas to Israel.

On January 26, the IDF announced that it recovered the body of the last hostage in Gaza. Hamas claimed it had provided all the information it had about the hostage's remains and accused Israeli government of obstructing efforts to search for them in Israeli-controlled areas of Gaza.

=== Release of Palestinians held by Israel ===
After the return of the living hostages, Israel began releasing Palestinian prisoners, both living and deceased. Some 45 bodies of Palestinians were turned over to the Red Cross without identification on October 15, with more expected. The Nasser Medical Complex in Gaza later reported that Israel had returned the remains of the 45 Palestinians with blindfolds, handcuffs, and legcuffs still on the bodies. As of October 20, Israel had returned 150 bodies to Gaza, of which 135 had been held at Sde Teiman detention camp. According to doctors in Khan Yunis, forensic examinations "indicate that Israel carried out acts of murder, summary executions and systematic torture against many of the Palestinians", and showed "signs of direct gunfire at point-blank range and bodies crushed beneath Israeli tank tracks". Reports of torture were confirmed by Palestinian detainees who were released alive by Israel as part of the Gaza ceasefire deal. The IDF denied engaging in torture, stated that it operates in accordance with international law, and said it had returned the bodies of combatants, but this could not be independently verified. Relatives of some of the deceased denied these allegations.

The living Palestinians released by Israel include 1,718 Gaza detainees arrested over the course of the war. About 1,700 of these Gazans had been held without charge. Prior to the release, 11,056 Palestinians, including hundreds of women and children, were held in Israeli prisons according to HaMoked, with about 3,500 of those held in administrative detention without trial. Some of the released prisoners were seen with protruding cheekbones, showing signs of recent beatings, and had to be supported by relatives as they were unable to walk. Among the released were 250 Palestinians who had been serving one or more life terms, most for deadly attacks on Israelis, while others had been convicted of lesser offenses, according to the Justice Ministry. Of these, 154 were expelled to Egypt, from where they are expected to be relocated to third countries, while the remainder returned to their homes in East Jerusalem, the West Bank, and Gaza. According to a list published by Hamas, those freed from Gaza included two women, six minors under 18, and about 30 men over 60.

=== Humanitarian aid ===
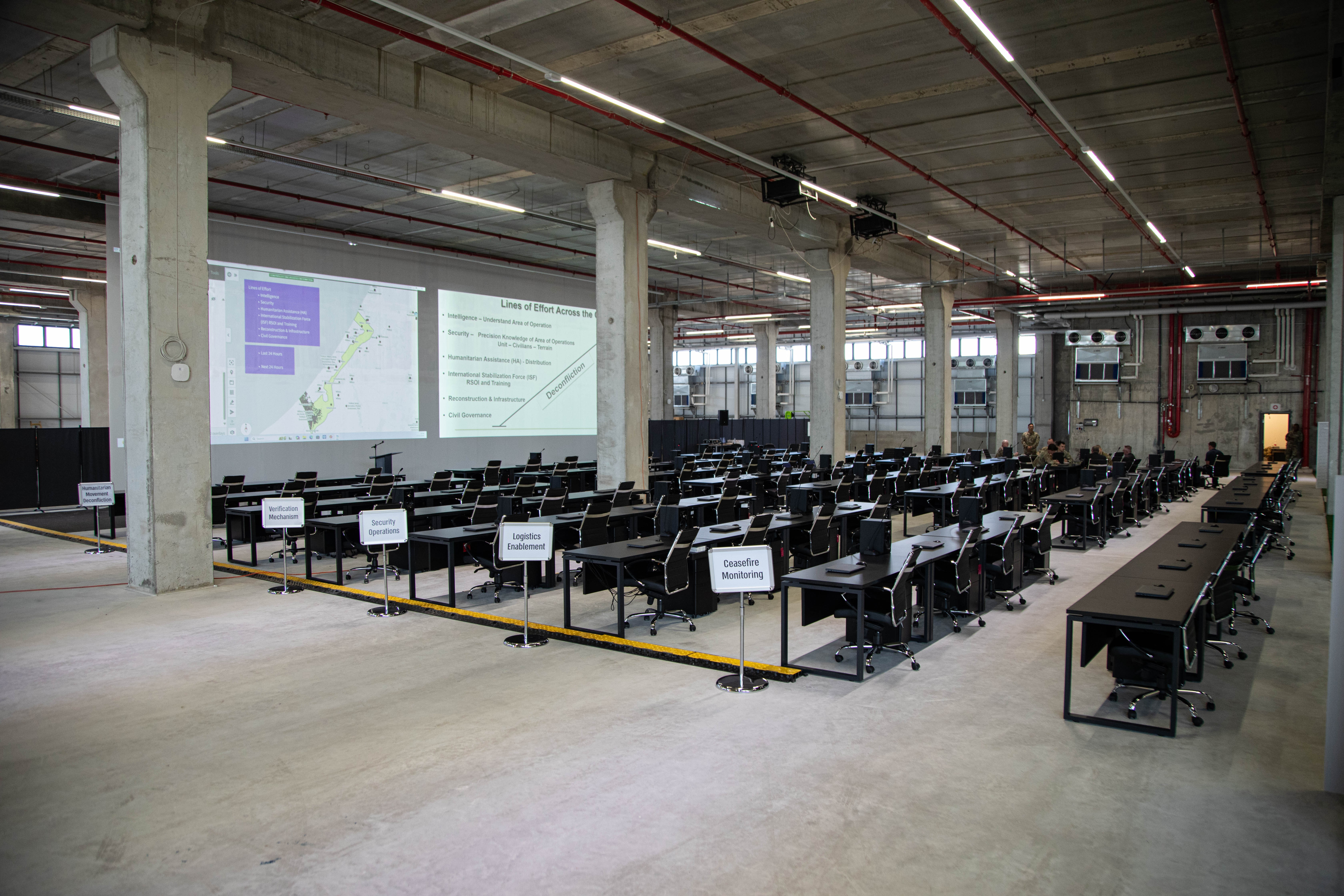
Civil-Military Coordination Center (CMCC) Kiryat Gat, Israel in October 2025

The phase one agreement stipulated that humanitarian aid should enter the Gaza Strip once hostilities had ceased. From October 21, 2025, the United Nations Office for the Coordination of Humanitarian Affairs began to publish daily reports about efforts of recovery in Gaza after the ceasefire, monitoring the establishment of food distribution centers, increase in medical help, measures to protect women, people with disabilities and so on. By November 18, it was reported that an average of 800 aid trucks were entering the Gaza Strip every day.

=== Civil-Military Coordination Center established ===
A Civil-Military Coordination Center (CMCC), under the leadership of Admiral Brad Cooper, head of US Central Command, was set up shortly after the ceasefire agreement came into effect on October 10, 2025. The center aims to help facilitate the flow of humanitarian, logistical, and security assistance from international counterparts into Gaza. US diplomat Steven Fagin serves as the civilian lead of the CMCC.

=== United Nations Security Council Resolution 2803 adopted ===
On November 3, the United States submitted a draft resolution to the United Nations Security Council that would mandate a Stabilization Force for two years under the direction of a Board of Peace. The draft underwent two further revisions before being adopted as United Nations Security Council Resolution 2803 on November 17.

=== Commencement of the second phase ===
The commencement of the second phase of the plan was announced by US Special Envoy Steve Witkoff on January 14, 2026 along with the formation of the National Committee for the Administration of Gaza to manage the day-to-day administration of the Gaza Strip during the transitional period. This phase marks a shift from the initial ceasefire to "demilitarization, technocratic governance, and reconstruction".

On January 17, the White House announced the formation of a broader "Board of Peace," including a Gaza-focused executive board, which U.S. officials said was intended to support the implementation of postwar arrangements. Israel received a formal U.S. invitation to join the Board of Peace a couple of days later, as part of the administration's initial outreach to selected governments. It was reported that the United States sent invitations to approximately 60 countries in total, underscoring the administration's intention to establish the Board of Peace as a global conflict-resolution mechanism extending beyond Gaza.

The announcement prompted objections from the Israeli government, which stated that the proposal had not been coordinated with Israel and ran counter to Israeli policy. According to Israeli officials, the criticism also stemmed from the inclusion of Turkish and Qatari representatives on the proposed board. Israeli officials additionally warned that the board's proposed mandate could limit Israel's freedom of action in Gaza by transferring key security and governance decisions to an international forum.

Several European governments have signaled reluctance or refusal to participate in the broader "Board of Peace" initiative, with diplomats warning that the proposed mechanism could undermine the role of the United Nations and existing multilateral frameworks for peace and reconstruction.

Among EU member states, Hungary has been the only country to confirm its acceptance of an invitation, while others have expressed reservations related to the board's proposed charter and financing arrangements. Norway, Sweden, and France were among the countries that publicly declined to participate in the initiative, while Italy stated it would not join due to domestic legal and constitutional considerations.

Outside the European Union, Vietnam has also confirmed its acceptance, and a number of additional countries, including India, Australia, Jordan, Greece, Cyprus, and Pakistan, have acknowledged receiving invitations but had not announced decisions on participation at the time of reporting. It was later reported that Saudi Arabia, Turkey, Egypt, Qatar, the United Arab Emirates, Indonesia, and Pakistan formally agreed to join the board, significantly expanding its geographic scope.

On January 21, Israel reversed its earlier position after Prime Minister Benjamin Netanyahu agreed to join the U.S.-led Board of Peace, following further discussions with Washington. Netanyahu's office said Israel accepted the invitation after receiving clarifications regarding the board's structure and mandate, narrowing its scope and procedurally separating it from the broader Board of Peace framework, addressing some Israeli concerns. By that date, roughly 35 countries had accepted invitations.

On January 22, President Trump officially ratified the Charter of the Board of Peace during a high-profile ceremony at the World Economic Forum in Davos, Switzerland. Trump, serving as the Board's Chairman, was joined by leaders from 18 founding nations, including Kazakhstan's President Tokayev, who signed the charter to transition the body into a permanent international organization. During the launch, Jared Kushner presented a "futuristic" blueprint for a unified Gaza, featuring high-rise towers and an airport, while noting that the territory would include a new buffer zone along the Israeli border.

On February 2, the Rafah border crossing was reopened.

On March 5, Indonesia's president Prabowo Subianto threatened to quit the Gaza Peace Plan if Palestinians do not benefit, expecting to be an initial step towards a full Palestinian independence recognised by the international community with the help of the UN and the Organisation of Islamic Cooperation for the Palestinian cause.

=== Resignation of Hamas-backed Gaza government ===
On 6 July 2026, Hamas announced the resignation of its civil administration under the Gaza peace plan. According to PBS, an anonymous Israeli official said that the "alleged resignation of the Hamas government, where all of the Hamas members stay in their positions, is a spin that has no significance".

US envoy Jared Kushner reportedly met Hamas leader Khalil al-Hayya in Egypt on 16 August to discuss moving ahead with the handing over control of the Gaza Strip to the Palestinian technocratic government. On the following day, Kushner visited Israel and according to reports, tried to convince Netanyahu to cooperate with Hamas efforts to disarm.

== Violations and deviations ==
=== By Hamas ===
- On October 13, 2025, Israel accused Hamas of violating the ceasefire when it returned the remains of four deceased Israeli hostages; under the agreement, the remains of all hostages in the possession of Palestinian armed groups should be returned on the same day. The plan contains provisions for Hamas to share information with Israel on the deceased hostages that could not be returned within the first 72 hours. Egyptian teams were sent to the Gaza Strip to assist with the location of hostages' bodies. Hamas stated that it faced obstacles in recovering the bodies, as not all burial sites had been identified, bodies remained buried under rubble left by Israel's bombing of Gaza, as well as lack of access to DNA kits to test the remains. On October 25, Trump accused Hamas of refusing to return bodies, alleging: "Some of the bodies are hard to reach, but others they can return now and, for some reason, they are not." As of December 3, 2025, all bodies except one have since been located and returned by Hamas and their junior governing partner, Palestinian Islamic Jihad.
- On October 18, the US State Department stated that it had "credible reports" that Hamas was planning a major imminent attack against Gazan civilians, which it said would constitute a violation of the ceasefire. These comments were understood as a reference to the ongoing crackdown against opposing clans inside Gaza, many of which Israel arms and backs.
- On October 19, Israel accused Hamas of firing RPGs and sniper fire at Israeli troops stationed in Rafah, killing two IDF soldiers. Hamas denied the accusation, and reports have surfaced that the deaths were caused by an Israeli bulldozer driving over unexploded ordnance, although Israel denied this explanation. Israel proceeded to launch airstrikes. Hamas said that communication with the rest of its units in Rafah had been cut off for months and that, "we are not responsible for any incidents occurring in those areas." Donald Trump indicated that he did not believe Hamas leadership was involved.
- On October 28, body parts handed over by Hamas to Israel the previous day were identified as belonging to a deceased hostage, whose body was recovered by Israeli forces in November 2023 and additional remains received in March 2024. Prime Minister Netanyahu called it a "clear violation" of the ceasefire. The IDF released a video which it says shows three Hamas militants placing a deceased person underneath rubble, and staging the discovery of the remains of deceased hostage Ofir Tzarfati to members of the International Committee of the Red Cross (ICRC). The ICRC issued a statement that it was not aware a cadaver was placed there beforehand and that it was "unacceptable that a fake recovery was staged".
- On October 28, an IDF official said that its forces were shot at in Rafah and one of its soldiers, who was conducting demolitions at the time, was killed. The IDF stated it returned fire in response. Involvement was denied by Hamas, which reiterated its commitment to the truce.
- On November 19, the IDF said that Hamas had fired on its troops. There were no reported injuries.
- On December 24, an IDF official said that an explosive was detonated under an IDF vehicle while Israeli soldiers were "dismantling" militant infrastructure, wounding 1 Israeli soldier. Hamas denied responsibility for the explosion and claimed that the explosion was caused by unexploded ordinance.
- On February 3, 2026, the IDF said that in southern Gaza, packages of humanitarian aid from UNRWA were used for hiding weapons including 110 rockets.
- On February 4, the IDF said that Hamas militants were filmed using medical vehicles to transport weapons between a hospital and a school.

=== By Israel ===
The Palestinian Centre for Human Rights, a Gaza-based human rights organization, documented at least 129 violations by Israel between October 13 and October 18. In the first 44 days of the ceasefire, Israeli attacks killed 342 Palestinians across 497 ceasefire violations, according to the Gaza Government Media Office. Those killed by Israel are often subsequently accused of approaching the Yellow Line intended to demarcate the boundaries of Israel's withdrawal within Gaza. As well, while the agreement called for 600 trucks of humanitarian aid to enter Gaza per day, Israel allowed an average of 145 trucks to enter per day between October 10 and November 2. As of June 2026, Israeli attacks had killed at least 992 Palestinians and injured 3,138 others as well as 3,269 Israeli ceasefire violations were recorded. In June 2026, an independent UN inquiry concluded that, as Israeli forces continue to kill children in Gaza frequently, the Gaza genocide is still ongoing even after the ceasefire. The inquiry established that Israeli attacks against the children of Gaza represent an attempt to undermine the continued existence of the Palestinian people.

- On October 14, Israeli forces killed at least seven Palestinians: six in Gaza City, including five by an aerial attack in Shuja'iyya, and one by a drone strike in Khan Yunis. The Israeli military said the attacks in Shuja'iyya targeted individuals who advanced beyond the Yellow Line after ignoring warning shots. Hamas spokesperson, Hazem Qassem, condemned the attacks, calling them a violation of the ceasefire agreement.
- On October 14, Israel closed the Rafah border crossing and stated that the amount of humanitarian aid allowed into the Gaza Strip would be reduced, in response to Hamas's failure to return the remains of all deceased hostages. After four bodies were handed over and further returns were announced for the following day, Israel briefly reversed the restriction. When no further remains were delivered, the crossing was again closed indefinitely. Hamas had earlier stated that recovery efforts were hampered because many burial sites were still unknown amid the extensive destruction in Gaza. Under the ceasefire terms, Israel was to permit up to 600 humanitarian aid trucks to enter Gaza each day. Since then, the limit had been reduced to 300, with Israeli officials attributing the change to ongoing delays in locating and recovering hostages' remains. Data from the UN2720 Monitoring and Tracking Dashboard, which records the movement of humanitarian convoys entering Gaza, showed that between October 10 and 16, 216 trucks reached their intended destinations within the Gaza Strip.
- On October 17, Israeli forces opened fire on a bus carrying members of the Abu Shaaban family in the Zeitoun neighbourhood of Gaza City, killing 11 of them, including women and children. The IDF stated that the vehicle entered a restricted area and ignored multiple warning shots.
- On October 19, the IDF carried out airstrikes across the Gaza Strip. An Israeli airstrike killed two Palestinians in eastern Jabalia. According to Channel 12, the attack in Rafah was intended to protect members of the Popular Forces, an Israeli-backed gang led by Yasser Abu Shabab that is accused of looting humanitarian aid entering the Gaza Strip. An Israeli airstrike also killed six Palestinians in the central Gaza city of Zuwayda. Those killed in the strike were members of Hamas's al-Qassam Brigades, including Yahya al-Mabhouh, the commander of Hamas's elite unit in the Jabalia Battalion. Additionally, two separate strikes killed six more people, including children, near Nuseirat in central Gaza, with 13 others injured. Further, a woman and two children were killed in a drone strike that hit a tent accommodating displaced persons near the town of Asda, located north of Khan Yunis. By the end of the day, Israeli airstrikes had killed at least 45 people. The IDF stated that strikes were a response to a violation of the agreement, alleging that two soldiers had been killed in an attack in Rafah.
- On October 28, Israeli attacks in Gaza killed at least 104 people, at least 66 of whom were children and women. The IDF stated that it was targeting Hamas, including 21 militants who allegedly participated in the 7 October attacks. Israeli forces later said that the truce was back on in Gaza. The IDF also stated that the attack was a response to two incidents that occurred on the same day, the return by Hamas of body parts previously repatriated to Israel, and an attack on IDF soldiers in Rafah that left one soldier dead. Hamas denied involvement in the attack on soldiers. Hamas said that it postponed the planned handover of the remains of a deceased hostage it had recovered.
- On October 29, an Israeli attack killed two people in Beit Lahia. According to Israel, the attack targeted a site storing weapons that posed "an immediate threat" to Israeli forces.
- On November 2, a Palestinian man was killed by an Israeli drone in Shuja'iyya. Israel alleged that he had crossed the Yellow Line.
- On November 10, two Palestinians, including a child, were killed by an Israeli drone strike in east Khan Yunis. The IDF said that the Palestinians killed posed "an immediate threat" to Israeli forces.
- On November 19, Israel launched several airstrikes in Gaza, targeting Zaytun, Shuja'iyya and Khan Yunis. These attacks killed 33 people, including 17 in Khan Yunis and 16 in Gaza City, with 77 others injured.
- On November 22, the Israeli military launched airstrikes in Gaza, killing at least 24 people: eleven in Rimal, three at a house near Al-Awda Hospital, seven (including a child) at a house in Nuseirat, and three at a house in Deir al-Balah; another 54 were injured by the attacks. According to Israel, the strikes targeted Hamas militants and killed five senior members.
- On November 24, four people were killed by Israeli forces, including a man killed by a drone attack in Bani Suheila and a child killed in northern Gaza City after ordnances left by the IDF exploded.
- On November 29, two Palestinian children were killed while collecting firewood by an Israeli drone strike on the town of Bani Suhayla, east of Khan Yunis, near Al-Farabi School. The area targeted in the attack lies beyond the Yellow Line, the demarcation line for the redeployment of Israeli forces.
- On November 29, Israeli airstrikes were carried out in Rafah and Khan Yunis. Israeli fighter jets carried out strikes east of the city of Rafah.
- On December 3, an Israeli strike targeted a shelter camp in Al-Mawasi, killing five Palestinians, including two children and injuring several others. Israel said that it struck a Hamas target in response to an alleged clash between Palestinian militants and IDF forces.
- On December 5, the Israeli military, using helicopter gunships, launched an assault on the eastern and northeastern regions of Khan Yunis, in violation of the ceasefire.
- On December 7, a three-year-old girl was killed by the Israeli military while playing in her family's tent in Al-Mawasi. The IDF later issued a statement that it was "not aware of a strike" but would "conduct an additional review".
- On December 18, Israeli forces fired a mortar shell into a residential area in Gaza City during an operation on the Yellow Line, injuring at least 10 people.
- On December 19, five Palestinians, including a baby, were killed by Israeli soldiers over the Yellow Line in Tuffah, Gaza City. Israeli forces said that they identified "a number of suspicious individuals … in command structures west of the Yellow Line". The IDF also stated that is "under review" and "regrets any harm to uninvolved individuals."
- On December 25, three Palestinians were killed by Israeli forces after, according to the IDF, crossing the Yellow Line and "posing a threat" to them.
- On January 4, 2026, Gaza health authorities reported three Palestinians including a 15-year-old boy and a fisherman were killed by Israeli forces in Khan Yunis.
- On January 8, at least 13 people, including five children, were killed by Israeli attacks in various locations in the Gaza. Israeli forces said that earlier that day, a projectile was launched "from the area of Gaza City toward the state of Israel" before it fell within the Gaza Strip.
- On January 11, three people were killed and nine others were injured in various locations in the Gaza Strip by Israeli forces.
- On January 12, an Israeli quadcopter drone targeted and killed three Palestinians and a woman was injured by Israeli gunfire in Khan Yunis.
- On January 15, Wafa reported that the six Palestinians, including a 16-year-old child were killed by Israeli forces on two homes in Deir al-Balah, with the IDF claimed that one of the victims was Muhammad al-Hawli, a commander of Al-Qassam Brigades. Additionally, Israeli forces killed one person at a roundabout in Rafah, another on a police post in Gaza City and two more from an Israeli air attack on a home in the Nuseirat refugee camp.
- On January 21, a father, his 13-year-old son, and a 22-year-old man were killed in an IDF drone strike; three journalists, including a member of the Agence France-Presse (AFP) traveling in an Egyptian Aid Committee vehicle, were killed by Israeli fire. The Israeli military stated they targeted "suspects" operating a drone affiliated with Hamas, which they deemed was a threat to troops. In a separate incident that day, a 13-year-old boy was reportedly shot and killed while gathering wood for cooking fuel. In total, 11 people were killed on that day by Israel.
- On January 25, the Gaza health ministry reported that three Palestinians were killed by Israeli forces, two in Tuffah and one in Khan Yunis. That same day, four people were injured by an Israeli drone in Gaza City.
- On January 30, five Palestinians were killed and eleven others were injured by Israeli attacks, two by a drone in the Maghazi refugee camp and three others in Rafah. The IDF stated that the strike in Rafah targeted "terrorists"from an underground location.
- On January 31, Israeli strikes targeted various locations in the Gaza Strip, killing at least 32 people, including 14 people at a police station in Gaza City, as well as two women and six children from two different families. The IDF stated that those strikes followed two separate ceasefire violations a day earlier, in which Israeli forces killed three militants who emerged from a tunnel in an Israeli-controlled area of Rafah, and four who approached troops near the dividing line.
- On February 4, at least 24 Palestinians, including two infants, were killed by Israeli strikes. Israel said that the strikes were a response after a militant attack on Israeli soldiers that seriously injured one, and targeted at least two militant commanders, three people who posed danger to its forces, and militant whom it accused of killing a soldier hostage.
- On February 9, seven people were killed by Israeli forces, including four that were killed after a residential building for displaced people in Nasser, Gaza City was attacked by Israel.
- On February 10, two Palestinians were killed by an Israeli drone while cycling in eastern Deir al-Balah near the ceasefire line.
- On February 15, at least 11 people were killed by Israeli forces in the Jabalia refugee camp and in Khan Yunis. Al Jazeera reported that a commander of the Palestinian Islamic Jihad, Sami al-Dahdouh, was also killed by Israel in Tel al-Hawa, Gaza City. The IDF stated that the attacks struck "terror targets" in response to ceasefire violations by Hamas, saying that militants who had entered the Israeli-controlled area of the strip through a tunnel had been killed.
- On February 21, Israeli airstrikes targeted the Jabalia refugee camp and Qizan an-Najjar, killing two people. Israeli forces stated on X that the attacks targeted a fighter who crossed that demarcation line in northern Gaza and approached them "in a manner that posed an immediate threat."
- On February 27, Israeli drones targeted two police posts in the Bureij refugee camp and Al-Mawasi, killing six people.
- On March 7, a man and his daughter were killed by an Israeli drone in Khan Yunis.
- On March 15, at least 13 Palestinians, including two children, a pregnant woman and nine police officers, were killed by Israeli airstrikes in various locations in the Gaza Strip.
- On March 22, three members of the local police and a senior member of an armed group linked to Fatah were killed by Israeli airstrikes in Nuseirat and Sheikh Radwan respectively.
- On May 16, Israel took advantage of the ceasefire to assassinate the Hamas leader in the Gaza Strip by bombing his apartment where he resided, killing his family in the process.
- On May 28, Prime Minister Netanyahu declared that he ordered Israeli forces to take control of more of Gaza's territory, first by seizing 70%.
- On June 20, Israel killed Al Jazeera cameraman Ahmed Wishah. Al Jazeera condemned the act, stating: "This constitutes a new and flagrant violation of all international laws and norms, and reflects a continued systematic policy of targeting journalists and silencing the voice of truth." The Israeli army claimed, without presenting evidence, that Wishah was a member of Hamas. The army had already killed Wishah's brother in April.
- On July 7, just minutes before the World Cup match between Egypt and Argentina, an Israeli airstrike killed Mohamed al-Wahidi, a member of the Egyptian Committee in Gaza who was organizing public screenings of the matches for the people of Gaza. The bomb targeted the taxi carrying al-Wahidi and also killed two children who were on the street.
- On July 9, Ahmad Esleem, a Palestinian truck driver with World Central Kitchen who was bringing humanitarian aid to Gaza, was killed by an Israeli soldier in an act that witnesses called a "field execution."
- In mid-July, Israel killed a Palestinian man, and on the same day—while a funeral was being held—it bombed the gathering, killing seven people and wounding 22.

== Opinions ==
According to an analysis published in The Wall Street Journal, Hamas's shift towards agreeing to the peace deal was primarily driven by growing diplomatic pressure both from within and outside the group. This pressure stemmed from Arab and other Muslim countries, especially Turkey, Egypt, and Qatar, who urged Hamas to accept the agreement. Their pressure was influenced by Trump's efforts and by the Israeli attacks in Lebanon, Iran, and Qatar, which heightened fears in the Arab world of Israel's growing power. Additionally, Hamas faced pressure at home, where the people in Gaza were suffering from hunger and destruction and simply wanted the war to end. These factors combined to force Hamas into agreeing to release the hostages and sign the first part of the peace deal, as it saw no other way to end the war.

Historian Rashid Khalidi stated on October 13, 2025, that Trump's plan was not a genuine peace process, since it consisted of a ceasefire, a hostage exchange, and a temporary lift of the Israeli blockade of Gaza, but did not contain plans for "completely equal rights for all individuals and both peoples". Belén Fernández wrote in Al Jazeera that Tony Blair's inclusion in the transitional government "smacks rather hard of colonialism" and that Blair's support for the 2003 invasion of Iraq should preclude him from any role on the "Board of Peace". The Guardian wrote that the plan does not provide Palestinians with "meaningful agency" and "risks freezing subjugation under the language of peace". Human rights attorney Noura Erakat said that the goal of the plan is to "force outcomes onto the Palestinian people". Diana Buttu, a former spokesperson for the PLO, said the plan "normalised genocide".

== Reactions ==
=== Palestine and Israel ===
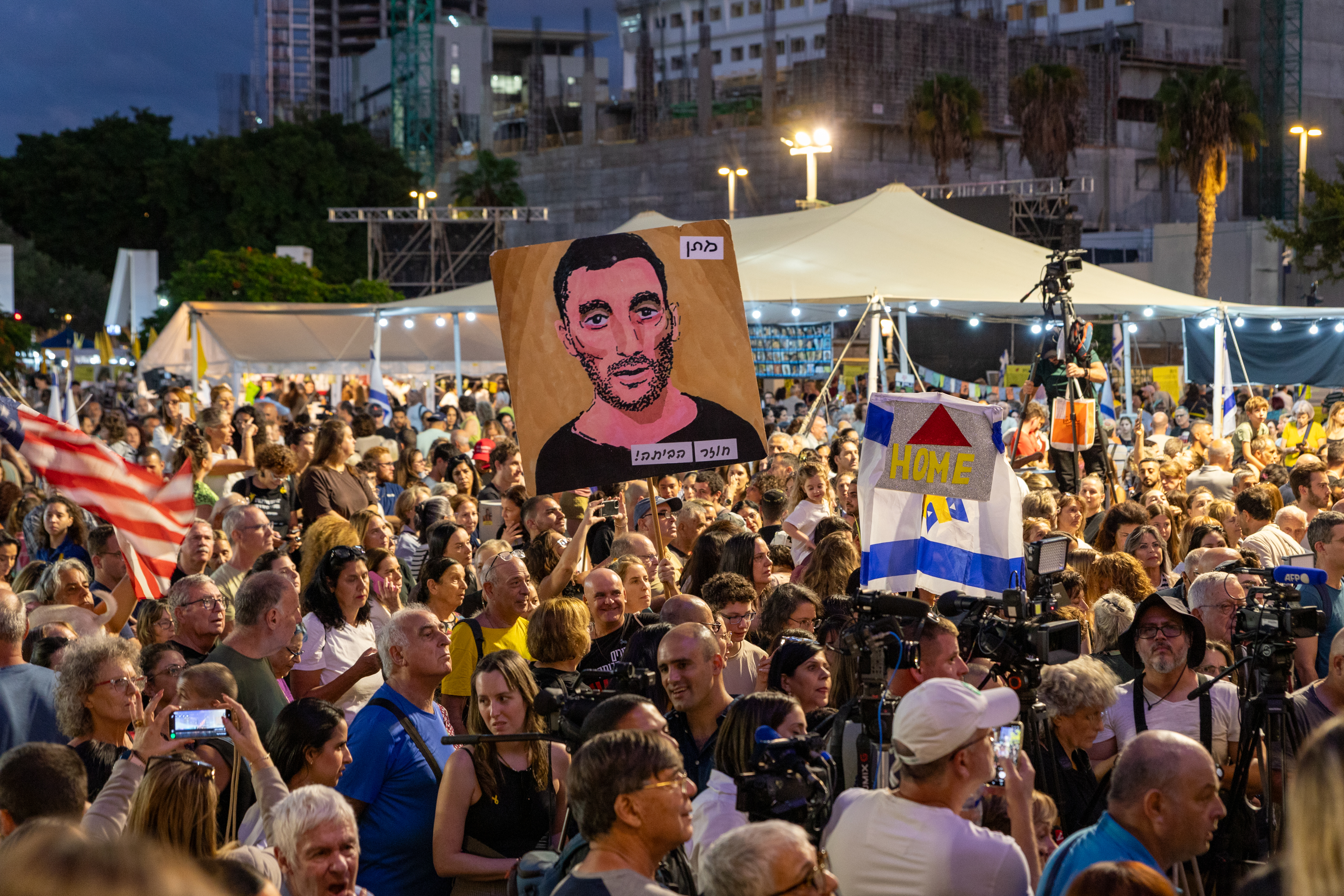
Hostages Square in Tel Aviv, October 9, 2025, following the announcement of the impending release of Israeli hostages. Artwork says "Matan [Angrest] is coming home!".

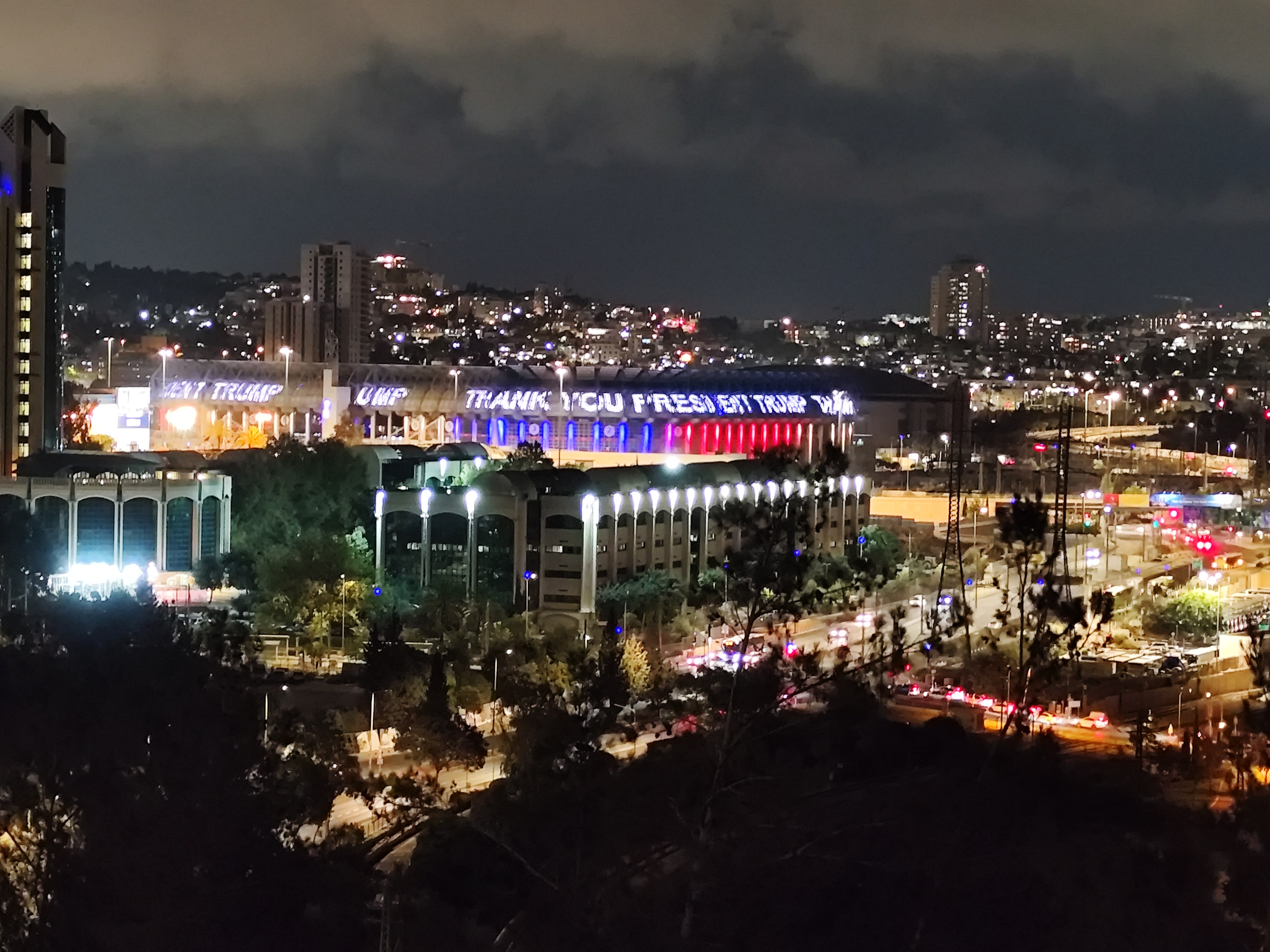
Teddy Stadium with sign "Thank you president Trump"

Support in the Israeli government was mixed. Finance Minister Bezalel Smotrich denounced the plan as "a historic missed opportunity" which will force Israel to "fight in Gaza again". Leader of the Opposition Yair Lapid endorsed the plan and said, "Israel should announce it is joining the discussions led by the president to finalize the details of the deal."

Israeli opposition politician Benny Gantz lauded "Trump's extraordinary efforts to secure a hostage deal and safeguard Israeli security" and said the plan "must be implemented, our hostages brought home, Israel's operational freedom maintained, Hamas's terror regime in Gaza replaced, and moderate Arab States instated instead as I proposed a year and a half ago".

On October 12, 2025, Israeli Prime Minister Benjamin Netanyahu warned that the "military campaign is not over" and that Israel's enemies were "trying to recover in order to attack us again". Defense Minister Israel Katz announced that "Israel's great challenge after the phase of returning the hostages will be the destruction of all of Hamas' terror tunnels in Gaza." Katz said he "instructed the IDF to prepare to carry out the mission".

The Palestinian Authority called Trump's efforts "sincere and determined" and said that it is committed to holding new parliamentary and presidential elections within a year of the war's end, changing school curriculum, and forming a new security force, while affirming its desire for a "modern, democratic, and non-militarized Palestinian state, committed to pluralism and the peaceful transfer of power".

Taher al-Nounou, a senior Hamas official, said in September they were not consulted about the current proposal and, in any case, they will not accept the demilitarization offer as Israel has demanded. Hamas leader in Gaza, Izz al-Din al-Haddad, reportedly objected to the proposal as he is thought to believe that the plan aims to finish Hamas. Hamas's political leadership in Qatar have been reported to be open to accepting the proposal with certain amendments. On October 3, 2025, Hamas issued an official response, declaring its readiness to release all hostages, to hand over the administration of the Gaza Strip to independent Palestinian technocrats and to negotiate further details.

Palestinian Islamic Jihad (PIJ) leader Ziyad al-Nakhalah called the plan an attempt by Israel to impose through the U.S. "what it could not achieve through war" and condemned "the American-Israeli declaration" as "a recipe for blowing up the region". Following Hamas's agreement to the plan, the PIJ followed suit and said Hamas's response "represents the stance of the Palestinian resistance forces".

In the Popular Front for the Liberation of Palestine, senior member Abu Ali Hassan, said that the plan is "a recipe for managing the war and prolonging it, not for its end". He also called the plan "a desperate attempt to separate Gaza from the Palestinian territorial entity".

=== International ===
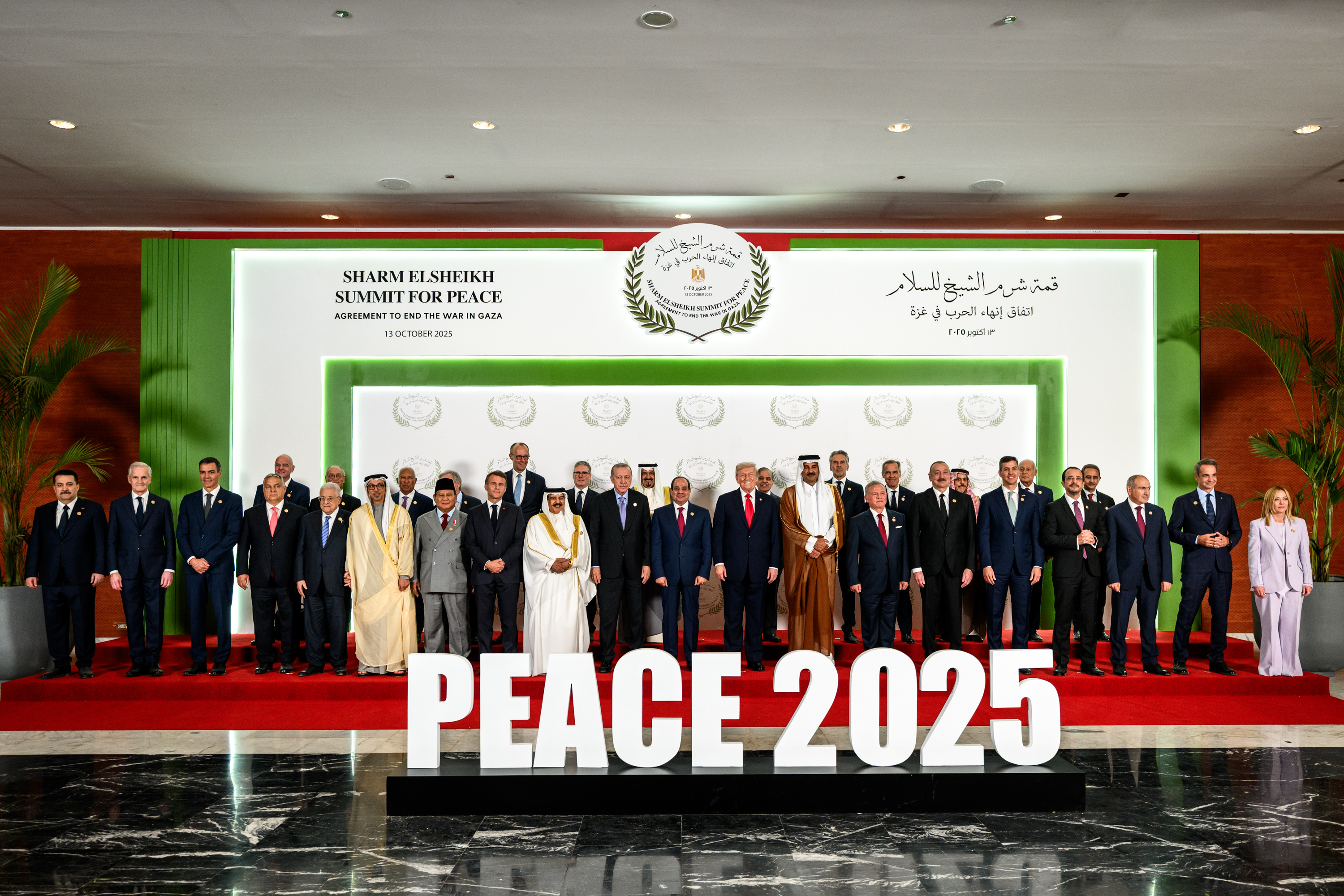
Gaza peace summit on October 13, 2025

International leaders widely welcomed the ceasefire, affirmed its importance, and hoped it would lead to lasting peace. Argentine president Javier Milei stated that Trump should be awarded the Nobel Peace Prize. Canadian prime minister Mark Carney praised the efforts of Trump, Qatar, Egypt, and Turkey in negotiating the agreement and called on Israel and Hamas to carry out their commitment to free all hostages. The collective presidency of Bosnia and Herzegovina unanimously decided to nominate Trump for the Nobel Peace Prize for his "commitment to establishing lasting peace in Gaza" and the Middle East, marking this the first official nomination for the 2026 edition of the award.

Immediately following the release of the hostages, U.S. President Trump visited Israel and addressed Israel's Parliament, the Knesset, celebrating the release of hostages and calling for a commitment to end fighting and rebuild Gaza. He described the ceasefire as marking "not only the end of war, but the end of an age of terror and death and the beginning of the age of faith and hope and of God", and stated that Israel had "won all that it can by force of arms… Now it is time to translate these victories… into the ultimate prize of peace and prosperity for the entire Middle East." He urged Palestinians to "turn forever from the path of terror and violence" and extended an appeal to Iran for "friendship and cooperation". Trump also highlighted the role of Arab and Muslim countries in pressuring Hamas to release hostages, calling it "an incredible triumph for Israel to have all these nations working together as partners in peace".

On October 6, 2025, High Representative Kaja Kallas announced that the European Union seeks a role in the proposed transitional authority for Gaza, stating, "we feel that Europe has a great role and we should be also on board with this." The European Union has two overseas operations in the Palestinian territories, the European Union Border Assistance Mission to Rafah and the European Union Mission for the Support of Palestinian Police and Rule of Law.

The United Nations special rapporteur for human rights "expressed hope for a permanent ceasefire", but said that multiple portions of the plan contradicted international law and the ICJ advisory opinion on Israel's occupation of Palestine.

On October 23, 2025, the Knesset passed a preliminary reading of bill that would extend Israeli sovereignty to all Israeli settlements in the West Bank. The bill was condemned by Secretary of State Marco Rubio as "counterproductive" to Trump's Gaza peace plan. Trump added that "Israel would lose all of its support from the United States if that happened."

In October 2025, Steven Fagin, who previously served as the U.S. ambassador to Yemen, was designated as the civilian leader of the Civil-Military Coordination Center to facilitate the implementation of the peace plan. Secretary of State Marco Rubio visited the center located in Kiryat Gat, which is 56 kilometers (34.7 miles) south of Tel Aviv, and remarked that the center demonstrated a "healthy optimism" regarding advancements in the implementation of the ceasefire.

Tens of thousands of individuals have taken to the streets in various cities throughout Europe to commemorate the UN International Day of Solidarity with the Palestinian People in November 2025, urging for more robust global measures to address the persistent and lethal breaches of the US-mediated ceasefire.

On November 27, 2025, Amnesty International released a report stating that despite the ceasefire, Israel continues to commit a genocide in the Gaza Strip by continuing to purposefully inflict conditions of life meant to bring about their bodily annihilation.

In February 2026, Argentine President Javier Milei reiterated his support for the peace plan during a meeting of the Board of Peace in the US. Milei stated that Argentina is willing to provide White Helmets Commission personnel to the "stabilisation force" in Gaza, adding that the members of the White Helmets have proven experience in pacification missions around the world.

== See also ==
- Arab Peace Initiative – Proposal from the 2002 Beirut Arab League Summit
- Road map for peace – 2002 US two-state solution proposal for the Israeli–Palestinian conflict
- July 2025 Conference on the Implementation of the Two-State Solution – Conference on the Israel–Palestine two-state solution
- New York Declaration – Conference on the Israel–Palestine two-state solution

== Bibliography ==
- Farah, Randa (October 31, 2013) [2003]. "The Marginalization of Palestinian Refugees". In Niklaus Steiner; Mark Gibney; Gil Loescher (eds.). Problems of Protection: The UNHCR, Refugees, and Human Rights. New York: Routledge. pp. 160–. ISBN 978-1-135-39548-3. OCLC 863822377.
- Wolfensohn, James (2010). A Global Life.
