= European Union Police Mission for the Palestinian Territories =

Organization

European Union Mission for the Support of Palestinian Police and Rule of Law
- Abbreviation: EUPOL COPPS
- Formation: November 2005
- Headquarters: Ramallah
- Head of Mission: Karin Limdal
- Parent organization: European Union
- Staff: 106
- Website: http://www.eupolcopps.eu

The European Union Mission for the Support of Palestinian Police and Rule of Law (EUPOL COPPS), is a European Union Common Security and Defence Policy (CSDP) mission for the Palestinian territories, based and operational in the West Bank. It is part of the wider efforts of the European Union in support of Palestinian state building in the context of working towards a comprehensive peace based on a two-State solution. It is one of two civilian missions the EU runs in the Palestinian territories, the other being the European Union Border Assistance Mission Rafah (EU BAM Rafah).

EUPOL COPPS has its headquarters in Ramallah, and its objective is to assist the Palestinian Authority in building the institutions of a future State of Palestine in the areas of policing and criminal justice under Palestinian ownership and in accordance with the best international standards. The support of the EU aims at increasing the safety and security of the Palestinian population and at serving the domestic agenda of the Palestinian Authority in reinforcing the rule of law. EUPOL COPPS acts also as a key channel for the efforts of the EU and the wider international community, in its area of responsibility, to improve the situation on the ground and obtain practical results.

== Establishment ==
EUPOL COPPS was established following an EU Council decision in November 2005, and builds on the work of the EU Co-ordination Office for Palestinian Police Support (EU COPPS), which was established in January 2005 within the office of the EU Special Representative for the Middle East Peace Process, Ambassador Marc Otte. The initiative followed the expression by EU leaders in June 2004 of their readiness to support the Palestinian Authority in taking responsibility for law and order, and in particular, in improving its Palestinian Civil Police Force and law enforcement capacity.

== Organisational structure ==
EUPOL COPPS is composed of 106 unarmed members of staff, 71 of whom are internationals and 35 locals. Most of the staff are seconds from EU member states. EUPOL COPPS has three operational pillars: a Security Sector Reform Section, Justice section and a Programme and Evaluation Department. All sections are composed of experienced police officers, magistrates and experts from EU Member States and non EU contributing countries, such as Canada, Türkiye and Norway. Close cooperation between the sections takes place through various thematic groups.

The current Head of Mission is Felix Andåker, who succeeded Karin Limda, Nataliya Apostolova, Kauko Aaltomaa, Rodolphe Mauget, Kenneth Deane, Henrik Malmquist and Paul Robert Kernaghan. The first Head of Mission was Jonathan McIvor. The Head of Mission receives guidance from EU High Representative for the Common Foreign and Security Policy through the EU Special Representative for the Middle East Peace Process.

In November 2025, the European Union offered to train 3,000 Gaza police officers through EUPOL COPPS as part of the Gaza peace plan.
