= Captive Society: The Basij Militia and Social Control in Iran =

2015 book by Saeid Golkar

- First edition cover
- Author: Saeid Golkar
- Publication date: June 2015

Captive Society: The Basij Militia and Social Control in Iran is a book written by Saeid Golkar and published by Woodrow Wilson Center Press and Columbia University Press in June 2015. The book presents the first concentrated, in-depth analysis of the Basij, Iran's a prominent paramilitary organization that suppresses dissidents, votes as a bloc, and indoctrinates Iranian citizens.

Golkar draws from a wealth of both published and unpublished sources, from more standard documents such as Basij and Revolutionary Guard publications to his own informal communications with Basij members. The book warns that the power of the Basij in Iran has led to the creation of a "captive society" – one that is run on paramilitary-generated fear. Golkar is an assistant professor in the Department of Political Science and Public Service at the University of Tennessee at Chattanooga, Concurrently, a Senior Fellow at the Chicago Council on Global Affairs (CCGA) and The Tony Blair Institute for Global Change in the UK. He received his Ph.D. in political science from Tehran University in 2008, he has held a postdoctoral fellowship at Stanford University and researched and taught at Northwestern University. he also served as a Fellow at the National Endowment for Democracy and the Woodrow Wilson International Center for Scholars.

The book was selected as one of the best human rights books of 2015. Foreign Affairs journal also called the book, a "skillful rendering". The book was reviewed by The Guardian; New book on basij helps explain how Iran's hardline faction keeps country captive.
