= Tony Blair Institute for Global Change =

British think tank and non-profit organisation

Tony Blair Institute

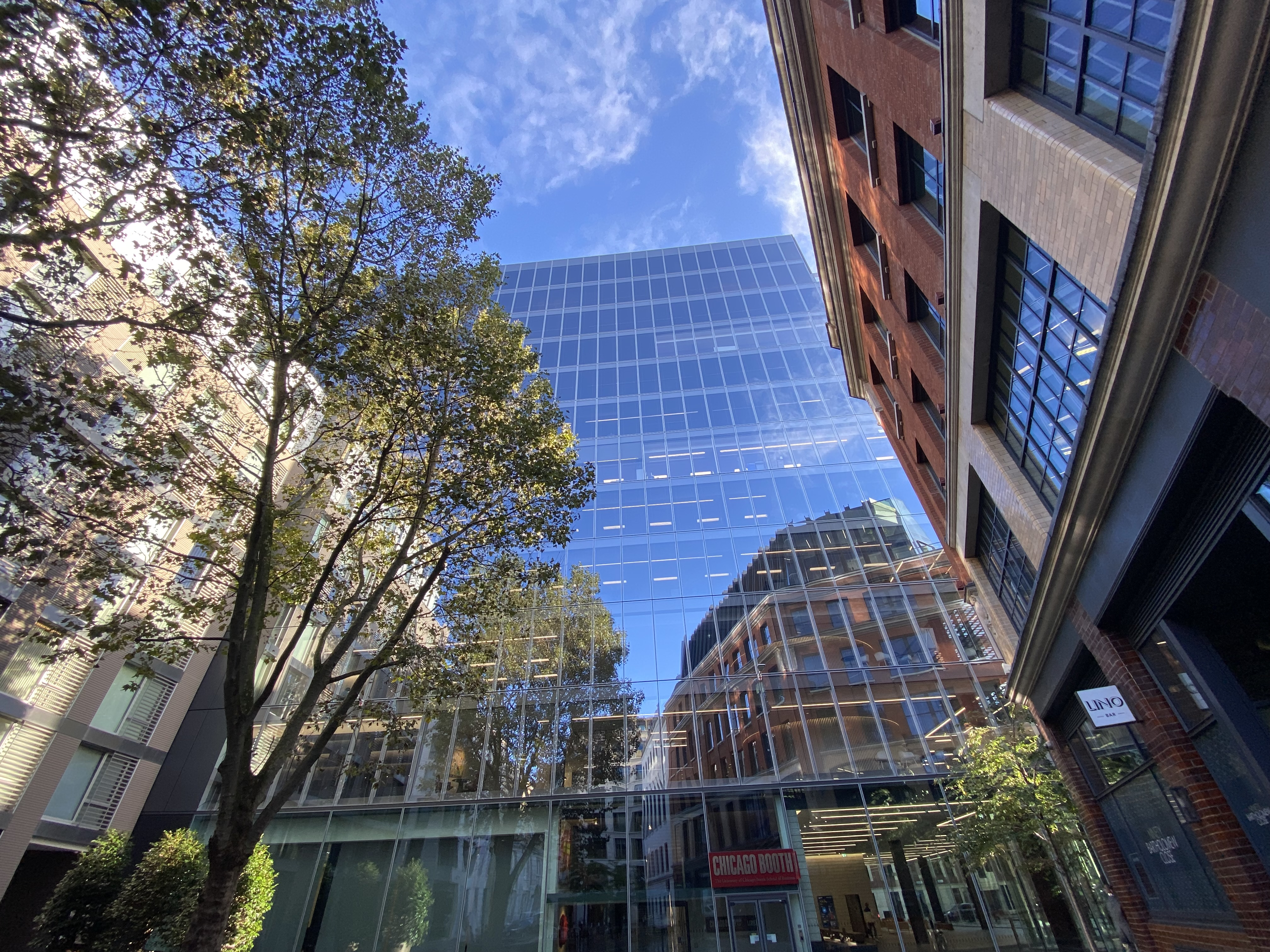
- The institute's headquarters at One Bartholomew Close, London
- Abbreviation: TBI
- Formation: 2016; 10 years ago
- Founder: Tony Blair
- Type: Public policy think tank, consulting, and advisory
- Legal status: Private company limited by guarantee, nonprofit organization
- Purpose: Public policy, governance, economic development, international development, technology
- Headquarters: One Bartholomew Close, London
- Region served: Worldwide
- Staff: 1,000 (2026)
- Website: institute.global

Instagram information
- Page: Tony Blair Institute for Global Change

YouTube information
- Channel: Tony Blair Institute for Global Change
- Genre: Thought Leadership

The Tony Blair Institute (TBI), known by its trade name the Tony Blair Institute for Global Change and the abbreviation TBI, is a British think tank and consultancy that advises governments and political leaders on strategy, policy and technology. It was founded in 2016 by former British prime minister Tony Blair and, by 2024, worked with governments in more than 45 countries.

During its early years, the institute expanded its advisory work across Africa, the Middle East, Asia Pacific, and Latin America while developing programmes on governance, public-sector reform and economic development. In the 2020s, it placed increasing emphasis on the use of digital technology in government, particularly artificial intelligence, digital public infrastructure and digital identity.

By 2024, the institute reported working with governments in more than 45 countries and had grown into one of the largest organisations of its kind. Its expansion, funding model and relationships with governments and technology companies have attracted both praise and criticism from commentators and political observers.

== Organization and services ==
=== Structure ===
The Tony Blair Institute is a private company limited by guarantee, incorporated in the United Kingdom on 1 December 2016. It is wholly owned by Blair and operates on a not-for-profit basis. Its registered office is at One Bartholomew Close, London, and it operates internationally with teams across Africa, the Middle East, Asia-Pacific, Europe and the Americas. Its work has been organised into a government advisory practice, which places teams inside governments, and a policy research arm.

=== Leadership ===
Blair, former prime minister of the United Kingdom from 1997 to 2007, is the institute's founder, owner and executive chairman. Catherine Rimmer, previously Blair's chief of staff, has been chief executive officer since 2016. Former prime minister of Finland Sanna Marin and former prime minister of Italy Matteo Renzi joined as strategic counsellors in September 2023 and June 2024, respectively.

=== Services ===
The institute advises governments on strategy, policy and delivery, with a stated emphasis on technology. Reported areas of work include governance, investment, infrastructure, energy and public-sector digitisation. By 2023 the institute reported that it was advising more than 45 governments.

== Programmes and delivery ==
The institute was formed in 2016 through the merger of several bodies Blair had established after leaving office, including the Africa Governance Initiative (AGI). Through AGI, its teams had worked with the governments of Sierra Leone, Liberia and Guinea during the 2014–2016 Ebola epidemic.

The institute's advisory work is built around the "delivery unit" method developed in Blair's own government under Michael Barber, which uses a small team at the centre of government to track progress against a leader's priorities. When AGI began working in Africa in 2008, no African presidential or prime-ministerial office operated such a unit; by 2021, according to the institute, around half of African governments had established one, with at least 25 delivery mechanisms at national level in countries including Togo, Burkina Faso and Angola.

During the COVID-19 pandemic, the institute partnered with Oracle to provide African governments with a cloud-based system for managing vaccination programmes, first adopted by Ghana, Rwanda and Sierra Leone. It later ran an Africa Vaccines Programme, embedding advisers in African governments, with funding from the Bill & Melinda Gates Foundation. It also published a report, A COVID-19 Vaccination Plan for Africa.

The institute has increasingly framed its work around the use of technology in government. It brokered partnerships to extend satellite internet access—including with Starlink—to support education, health care and crisis response; it reported that connectivity deployed through a "Reimagined State Accelerator" in Rwanda restored links for around 600,000 people displaced by Cyclone Freddy and brought 22 schools and health facilities online within two months. In 2023 it launched the TBI Digital Academy, developed with Panoply Digital, to train public servants in digital skills.

== Growth and expansion ==
The institute grew from a small policy unit at its 2016 launch into an organisation operating in more than 45 countries. Alongside its London base it opened offices in Accra, San Francisco and Singapore in 2021 and a regional office in Washington, D.C. in 2024.

=== Africa ===
The institute's Africa work originated with the Africa Governance Initiative, founded by Blair in 2008 and absorbed in 2016. It has advised the governments of Ghana, Rwanda, Kenya, Sierra Leone and Ethiopia, among others, and has published work on digital identity and the use of artificial intelligence in the public sector.

In Rwanda, it supported the establishment of a Strategy and Policy Unit and a Government Action Coordination Unit, and advised on education, health and digital infrastructure. In Kenya it supported a Presidential Delivery Unit, while in Rwanda it worked with the government's Imihigo performance-contract system. From 2025 the institute published a series of reports on AI in government, including Governing in the Age of AI: A New Model to Transform the State and Governing in the Age of AI: Unlocking a New Era of Transformation in Africa. In July 2026 Blair visited the Ethiopian Artificial Intelligence Institute in Addis Ababa, where the two bodies agreed to expand cooperation on AI in public services.

=== Asia-Pacific ===
The institute opened an office in Singapore in 2021. In February 2023 it signed a memorandum of understanding with an Indonesian state infrastructure-financing company to support Indonesia's energy transition, and in July 2023 agreed to advise the government of the Indian state of Odisha, signing a memorandum of understanding to provide policy support for the state's economic strategy and deploying a project team over a 24-month period. In June 2025 the institute signed a tripartite letter of intent with the Odisha government and Indian Institute of Technology Kanpur on energy-sector reform.

=== Middle East ===
From 2017 the institute worked with Saudi Arabia on its Vision 2030 programme and continued after the 2018 murder of Jamal Khashoggi. It has also advised the United Arab Emirates and Bahrain. Reporting on this work has noted the human-rights records of some of the governments involved.

=== Americas ===
The institute opened an office in San Francisco in 2021 and, in 2024, established a regional office in Washington, D.C. and began operations in Brazil, the Dominican Republic, Guatemala and Guyana.

=== United Kingdom ===
In the United Kingdom, the institute's Future of Britain programme produces policy papers on economic growth, technology and public services, organised around a concept it calls the "Reimagined State" that emphasises the use of AI to deliver public services more cheaply. Under this banner it has published reports including The Economic Case for Reimagining the State (2024), Governing in the Age of AI: Building Britain's National Data Library (February 2025), and Disruptive Delivery: Reversing Decline, Transforming Britain (September 2025); and it has argued that AI could reduce costs in departments such as the Department for Work and Pensions. The institute has been a long-standing advocate of a national digital identity scheme.

== Funding ==
Blair provided the institute's initial funding from the reserves of his former commercial advisory business. The institute is funded through government advisory contracts and private philanthropy.

In July 2018, The Daily Telegraph reported that Blair had agreed a deal worth £9 million with the government of Saudi Arabia. A spokesperson said the institute had received a donation from Media Investment Ltd, a subsidiary of the Saudi Research and Marketing Group registered in Guernsey, to fund work on modernisation and reform. The institute confirmed that it had received donations from the United States Department of State and from Saudi Arabia.

In 2024 the institute carried out paid advisory work for the government of Azerbaijan in connection with its hosting of the COP29 conference.

The Guardian reported in April 2025 that one of the institute's largest donors is the foundation of Larry Ellison (the multi-billionaire owner of Oracle Corporation and Skydance), which gave more than £52 million in 2023 and pledged a further £163 million.

== Ideology and political outlook ==
The institute reflects the political approach Blair developed as leader of the Labour Party and prime minister, associated with New Labour and the "Third Way". Theorised by the sociologist Anthony Giddens, the Third Way combined centre-left social aims with market-based economics and was presented by Giddens as distinct from both neoliberalism and traditional social democracy.

TBI describes itself as a non-partisan organisation, stating that this positioning allows it to advise leaders across the political spectrum rather than align with any single party. Consistent with this, it has worked with governments of differing political orientations in more than 45 countries. Commentators nonetheless place the institute's own outlook on the centre-left, describing it as promoting a technocratic, pro-technology and market-oriented globalist agenda in line with Blair's Third Way politics; critics argue this constitutes a distinct ideological programme rather than political neutrality. Its close advisory relationships with certain governments—including in the United Kingdom, where it has been seen as influential with the Labour government, and in states such as the United Arab Emirates—have led some observers to question the practical scope of its self-described non-partisanship.

== Reception and criticism ==
The institute has been criticised over the possible influence of its private donors and its advisory work for governments with poor human-rights records, including Saudi Arabia and Rwanda. Figures on the left of the Labour Party have raised concerns about the institute's access to former party leader Keir Starmer and Blair's influence on him; The Guardian described Blair in 2023 as more influential than during his premiership.

=== Climate policy interventions ===
In April 2025 the institute published a report, The Climate Paradox: Why We Need to Reset Action on Climate Change, which argued that international climate institutions had made insufficient progress. Climate scientists and commentators criticised the report, arguing that it downplayed the urgency of climate action and promoted technologies such as carbon capture and storage whose effectiveness at scale they questioned. Commentators noted that the report was welcomed by parties opposed to net zero targets, such as Reform UK.

In October 2025 the institute published a further report urging the UK government to drop its 2030 clean-power target in favour of prioritising energy affordability, while maintaining the 2050 net-zero goal. The position was criticised by environmental groups.

=== Gaza redevelopment proposals ===
According to reporting by the Financial Times, staff from the institute took part in early-stage work on a postwar development proposal for the Gaza Strip, known as the Great Trust, which also involved Israeli businesspeople and financial modelling by the Boston Consulting Group. The Financial Times reported that the proposal included offering financial incentives for up to half a million Palestinians to leave Gaza; the plan drew significant criticism, coinciding with statements by UN experts, NGOs and legal scholars describing Israel's conduct in Gaza as genocide. The institute said it had taken part in early discussions on postwar planning but did not author or endorse the final proposal.

In 2025 Blair developed proposals for a Gaza International Transitional Authority to govern the Gaza Strip after the war, elements of which were incorporated into US president Donald Trump's Gaza peace plan accepted by Israel and Hamas in October 2025.

=== Labour Party interventions ===
In May 2026 the institute published an essay on behalf of Blair on the future of the Labour Party, which called for closer relations with the Trump administration, changes to welfare spending, and increased use of North Sea oil and gas to support economic and AI-related growth. Climate and energy scientists criticised the proposals on fossil fuels, and Andy Burnham said the essay ignored inequality.

In September 2026, according to reporting by the Financial Times, the institute had a large presence at the Labour Party Conference where it organised 21 events, including a panel discussion between an Uber executive and the UK Minister for Roads. Uber, BP and Amazon are among the members of the institute's "Global Network for Change", which provides “access to regular networking events" including party conferences, in exchange for a $25,000 annual membership fee. At the same conference Wes Streeting, the UK Defence Secretary, was introduced to the stage by the President of ServiceNow, an AI cloud computing company.
