= July 2025 Conference on the Implementation of the Two-State Solution =

Conference on the Israel–Palestine two-state solution

International Conference for the Peaceful Settlement of the Question of Palestine and the Implementation of the Two-State Solution
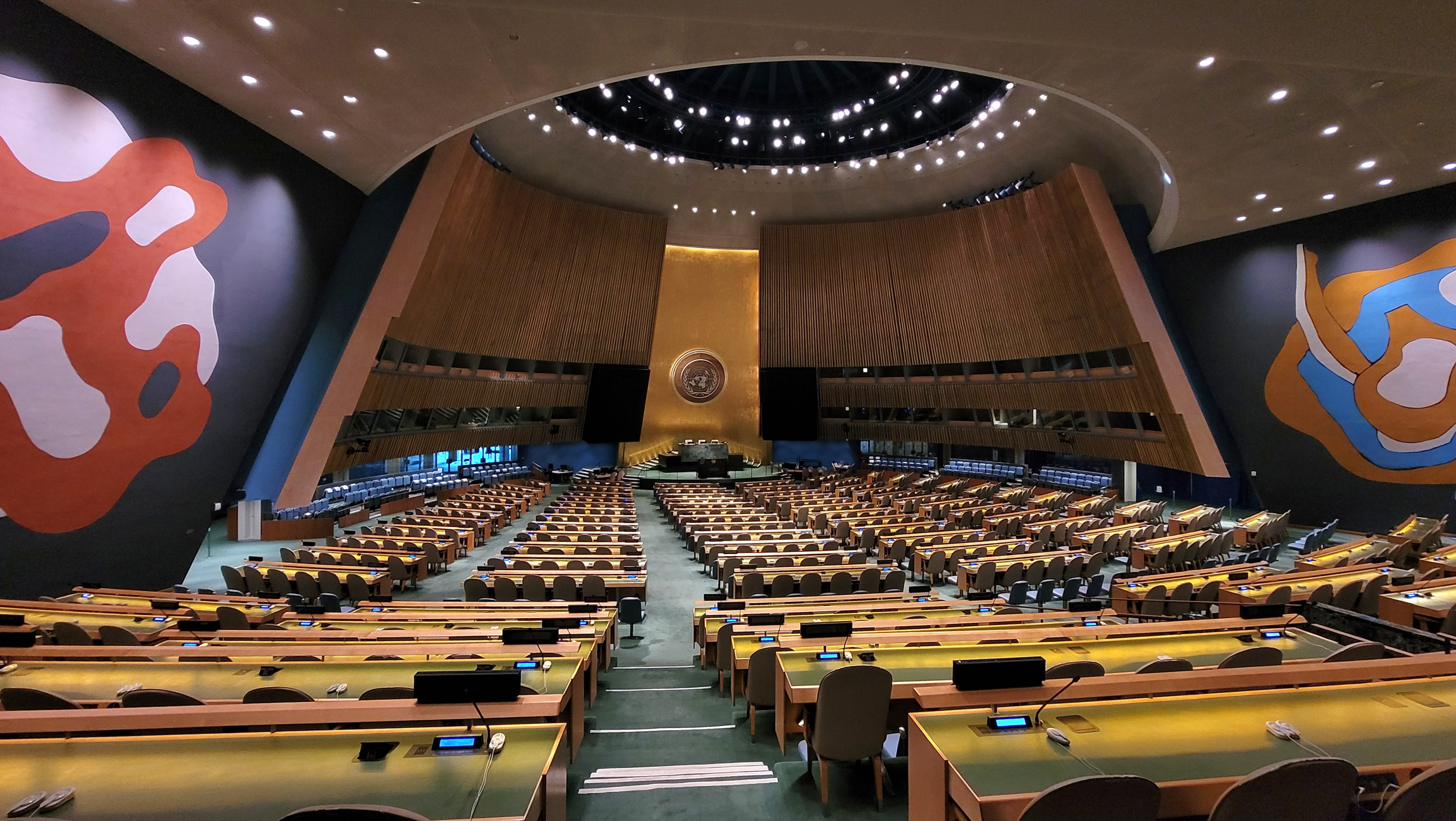
- UN General Assembly hall (location of the conference)
- Date: July 28–30, 2025
- Venue: United Nations Headquarters
- Location: New York City, United States
- Theme: Peaceful settlement of the question of Palestine and implementation of the two-state solution
- Organised by: United Nations; France (sponsor); Saudi Arabia (sponsor)

An international conference on the implementation of the two-state solution was held in New York City on July 28–30, 2025. The conference was authorized by a resolution of the United Nations General Assembly, adopted in December 2024 with a vote of 157 to 7. It was initially scheduled for June 17–20 but was postponed due to the Twelve-Day War. The conference aimed to develop a widely supported international framework addressing the disarmament of Hamas, the release of hostages in Gaza, the reform of the Palestinian Authority, and post-conflict planning, including consideration of a two-state solution.

The conference adopted a declaration envisioning a 15-month plan to establish a sovereign Palestine. France and Malta announced their intentions to recognize Palestine by September 2025, with San Marino joining them by the end of the year; additionally, Canada and the United Kingdom announced conditional recognitions by September 2025 depending upon several factors. The conference resumed on 22 September 2025 due to the continuing Gaza war.

== Background ==
On 27 September 2024, during a ministerial meeting on the sidelines of the 79th UN General Assembly in New York, Saudi foreign minister Faisal bin Farhan Al Saud launched a Global Alliance for the Implementation of the Two-State Solution. On December 4, 2024, the United Nations General Assembly adopted a resolution calling for an international conference at the highest level, to be held from June 2 to 4, with the aim of irreversibly advancing the establishment of a Palestinian state. A preparatory meeting was scheduled to precede it in May.

On May 24 in Paris, Foreign Minister Jean-Noël Barrot hosted his counterparts from Saudi Arabia, Egypt, and Jordan for a working session dedicated to preparing for the conference. During his visit to Indonesia, French President Emmanuel Macron stressed that only a political solution can restore peace and support long-term rebuilding. On June 3, French Foreign Minister Jean-Noël Barrot announced that France is "fulfilling its role in supporting the convening of an international conference under United Nations auspices." He added that Paris is working to ensure the summit delivers ambitious and tangible outcomes.

On June 9, 2025, Palestinian President Mahmoud Abbas sent a letter to both Macron and Saudi Crown Prince Mohammed Bin Salman in which he condemned Hamas's actions of October 7. He also endorsed the disarmament of Hamas and stated that the movement should play no role in the governance of the Gaza Strip. He also pledged to reform the Palestinian Authority and hold elections within a year, and invited Arab and international forces to deploy in Gaza to stabilize the security situation. On June 11, 2025, the Trump administration called on countries to not attend the conference, and warned of potential diplomatic consequences should any measures be taken that are deemed hostile toward Israel. The message emphasized that the United States opposes any unilateral recognition of a Palestinian state.

=== Planned recognition of Palestine ===
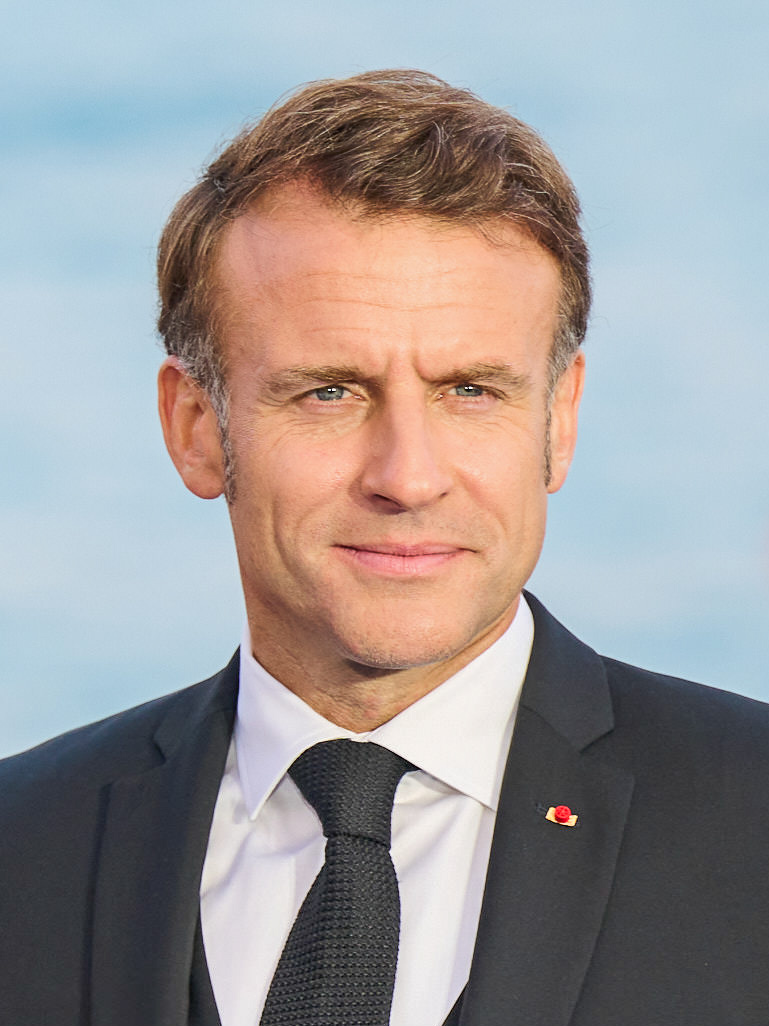
In July 2025, French president Emmanuel Macron (pictured) announced that France would recognize Palestine. In the lead-up to the conference, France lobbied several Western allies to join in its recognition of Palestinian statehood.

Prior to its initial postponement, the original purpose of the conference was to achieve further recognition of Palestinian statehood. At the time of the conference, 147 out of 193 UN member states (76%) recognized the State of Palestine. According to the Associated Press, the incumbent Netanyahu government of Israel, which boycotted the conference along with the United States, opposes Palestinian statehood and instead prefers "the status quo, where Israel maintains overall control, and Israelis have fuller rights than Palestinians".

In May 2025, Macron suggested that the recognition of a Palestinian state could be considered during the conference. Israel rejected Macron's suggestion regarding recognition, stating that both the recognition and the conference itself would amount to a reward for Hamas. Foreign Minister Barrot responded by encouraging Prime Minister Netanyahu to revisit his 2009 remarks endorsing a two-state solution. On July 24, 2025, just before the conference, Macron announced that France would formally recognize Palestine at a ceremony convened in conjunction with the 80th session of the United Nations General Assembly.

Maltese Prime Minister Robert Abela initially announced that Malta would recognize Palestine following the conference, though this decision was later delayed. In June 2025, NPR correspondent Daniel Estrin reported that Belgium, Luxembourg, Croatia, and Greece were expected to extend recognition during the conference. According to Politico, France also lobbied the Netherlands and the United Kingdom to recognize Palestine.

== Conference ==
Norwegian Foreign Minister Espen Barth Eide has pledged that his country will provide 200 million Norwegian kroner in support of the Palestinian government, which is facing an economic crisis due to Israel's withholding of tax revenues since October 2023.

=== Support for recognizing Palestine ===
On the second day of the conference, the United Kingdom announced that it would recognize Palestine in September, unless Israel agrees to reach a ceasefire in the Gaza War and refrains from annexing the West Bank. Malta also announced that it would recognize Palestine in September at the UN General Assembly, while San Marino announced it would recognize Palestine by the end of the year. The Jerusalem Post described France's efforts to secure recognition of Palestinian statehood as an overall failure, with states such as Japan, Singapore, (Note: Though Singapore did not recognize Palestine, it stated at the conference that it was "prepared in principle" to do so.) South Korea, and Australia declining to recognize Palestine. Late in July 29, a joint statement entitled the "New York Call" was co-signed by fifteen countries. The statement called the recognition of Palestine an "an essential step towards the two-State solution" and suggested that several other states could recognize Palestine in the coming months. The New York Call was endorsed by:

- Andorra
- Australia
- Canada
- Finland
- France
- Iceland
- Ireland
- Luxembourg
- Malta
- New Zealand
- Norway
- Portugal
- San Marino
- Slovenia
- Spain

Following the statement, Luxembourg announced that it was "currently positively inclined" to recognize Palestine in September. Canada announced that it would recognize Palestine in September, on the condition that Palestine be demilitarized and that the Palestinian Authority holds a democratic election in 2026 without Hamas. New Zealand declined to immediately recognize Palestine. A follow-up summit on Palestinian statehood was set for September 22, 2025, with the attendance of heads of governments and state.

=== New York Declaration ===
A seven-page "New York Declaration" was presented at the conference, laying out a 15-month phased plan for a demilitarized, sovereign Palestine. The plan includes tasking the Palestinian Authority with governing the entirety of Palestine, and establishing a temporary United Nations peacekeeping mission to provide security to Palestinians during the transition period. The declaration encourages states to recognize Palestine as a sovereign state, and denounces the October 7 attacks, calling on Hamas to disarm and give up its rule over Gaza while "mark[ing] a first condemnation by Arab nations of Hamas".

The declaration establishes a specialized committee responsible for developing and overseeing all necessary mechanisms, through continuous and binding follow-ups, to ensure the implementation of the conference's outcomes. The committee will comprise 19 countries and be jointly chaired by France and Saudi Arabia. It will include 17 chairpersons of the eight subcommittees emerging from this conference. The New York Declaration was initially endorsed by, in order:

- France
- Saudi Arabia
- Brazil
- Canada
- China
- Egypt
- Indonesia
- Ireland
- Italy
- Japan
- Jordan
- Mexico
- Norway
- Qatar
- Senegal
- Spain
- Turkey
- United Kingdom
- European Union
- Arab League

On September 12, 2025, the United Nations General Assembly passed a non-binding resolution endorsing the New York Declaration in a 142–10 vote.

== Reactions ==
On the opening day of the conference, the U.S. Department of State issued a statement in which it rejected the conference, describing it as unproductive and ill-timed. The statement asserted that the conference would not advance peace, but rather prolong the war, encourage Hamas by rewarding its destructive behavior, and undermine genuine efforts to achieve a lasting peace. On July 30, 2025, the Israeli Speaker of the Knesset, Amir Ohana, stated in an address before the Inter-Parliamentary Union in Geneva that a Palestinian state could be established in London or Paris.

== See also ==
- Bogotá conference
