= Gaza civil police =

- Motto: واجب شرف مسؤولية; Duty, Honor, Responsibility

Agency overview
- Formed: Mandated by United Nations Security Council Resolution 2803 on 17 November 2025

Jurisdictional structure
- Operations jurisdiction: Gaza Strip (under Resolution 2803)
- Governing body: Board of Peace
- General nature: Local civilian police

Website
- https://www.ncag.ps/en/police

As the result of the 2025 Gaza peace plan and United Nations Security Council Resolution 2803, an internationally-supported Gaza civil police force is to maintain law and order in the Gaza Strip for a transitional period until the administration of the Gaza Strip can be turned over to a reformed Palestinian Authority.

== History ==
=== Background ===
Following the 1993 Oslo Accords which lead to the establishment of the Palestinian Authority, a Palestinian Civil Police Force assumed responsibility for policing in the Gaza Strip. In 2007, the Hamas militant group took over the Gaza Strip and assumed control over its police force. Hamas and several other Palestinian militant groups carried out a series of coordinated armed attacks in southern Israel on 7 October 2023 leading to the start of the Gaza War. Israel and Hamas accepted a Gaza peace plan in October 2025 which was endorsed by the United Nations through the adoption of United Nations Security Council Resolution 2803 on 17 November 2025. UNSC Resolution 2803 empowers an international transitional body known as the Board of Peace, with the support of a International Stabilization Force, to "train and provide support to the vetted Palestinian police forces" in the Gaza Strip.

=== Development ===
On 18 November 2025, the European Union offered to train 3,000 Gaza police officers through the EUPOL COPPS mission which presently operates in the West Bank. France, Germany and Slovenia have expressed willingness to contribute to the mission.

Hamas has sought to incorporate personnel from the existing Gaza police force into the new civil police.

Recruitment for the new police force was started by the National Committee for the Administration of Gaza on 19 February 2026. Egypt and Jordan have agreed to help train new police officers. The NCAG hopes to deploy up to 5000 police officers in the Gaza Strip over the next 60 days.
