= 2025 Trump–Zelenskyy Oval Office meeting =

Meeting between the presidents of Ukraine and the U.S. on February 28, 2025

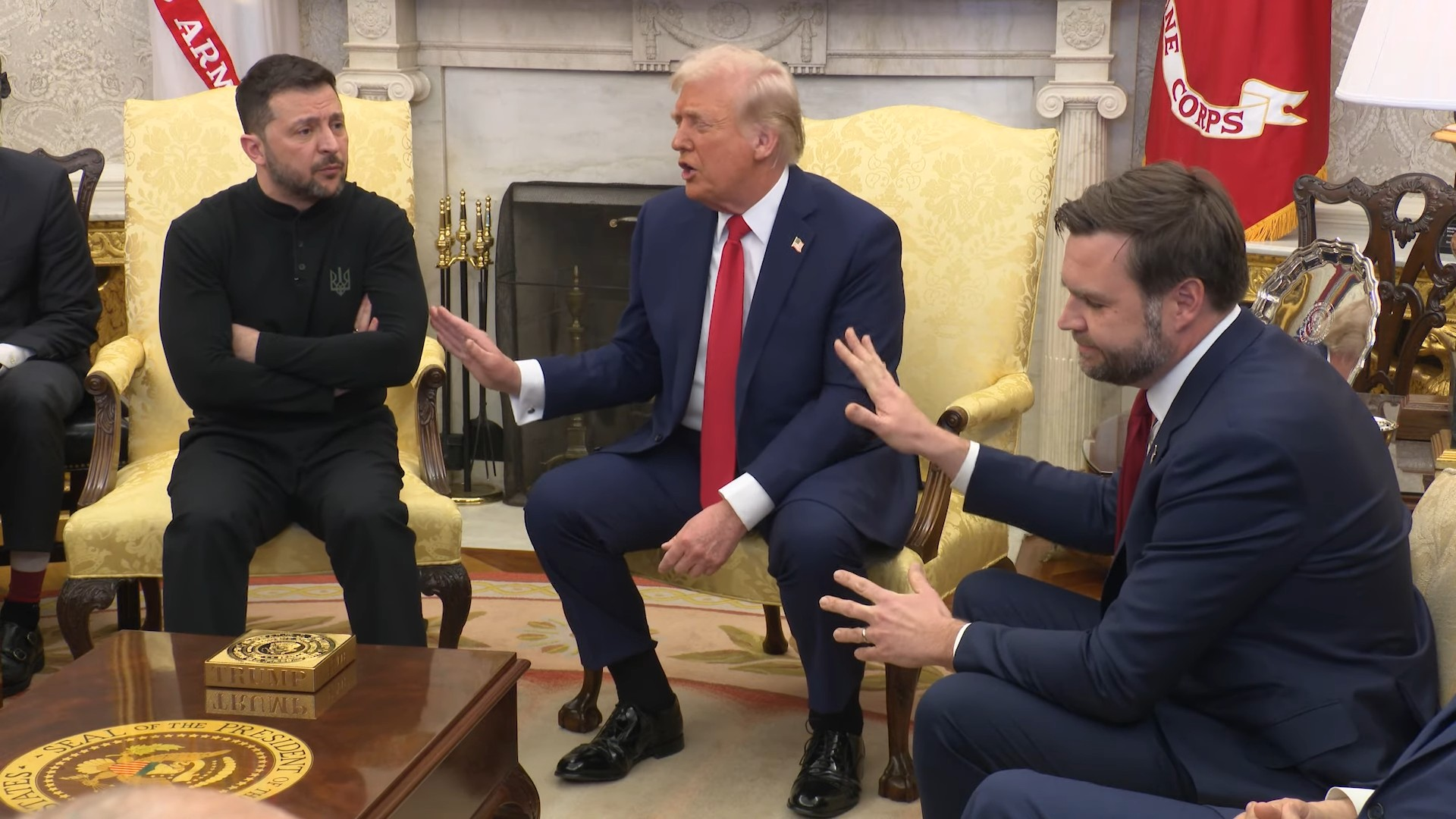
- Left to right: Volodymyr Zelenskyy arguing with Donald Trump and JD Vance in the Oval Office
- Date: February 28, 2025
- Time: 11:20–13:42 (EST)
- Venue: Oval Office, White House
- Location: Washington, D.C., United States
- Participants: United States: Donald Trump, President of the United States; JD Vance, Vice President of the United States; Marco Rubio, United States Secretary of State; Pete Hegseth, United States Secretary of Defense; Scott Bessent, United States Secretary of the Treasury; Ukraine: Volodymyr Zelenskyy, President of Ukraine; Andriy Yermak, Head of the Presidential Office; Olha Stefanishyna, Deputy Prime Minister; Andrii Sybiha, Minister of Foreign Affairs of Ukraine; Oksana Markarova, Ambassador of Ukraine to the United States; Yulia Svyrydenko, First Deputy Prime Minister of Ukraine

On February 28, 2025, U.S. president Donald Trump and U.S. vice president JD Vance held a highly contentious bilateral meeting with Ukrainian president Volodymyr Zelenskyy inside the Oval Office at the White House in Washington, D.C. Televised live and arranged with the intention to discuss continued U.S. support for Ukraine in repelling the ongoing Russo-Ukrainian war, it was expected to conclude with the signing of the Ukraine–United States Mineral Resources Agreement; however, the meeting ended abruptly and without a clear resolution. During its last ten minutes, Trump and Vance repeatedly criticized Zelenskyy, at times drowning out his voice. Media outlets described it as an unprecedented public confrontation between an American president and a foreign head of state.

Leading up to the meeting, there were tensions between the Trump administration and Zelenskyy's government. Trump wanted Ukraine to agree on a ceasefire with Russia to immediately halt hostilities and work towards a comprehensive peace deal. He had implied Ukraine was to blame for the Russian invasion, and had called Zelenskyy a "dictator" (a statement he later retracted). Zelenskyy wanted strong security guarantees against future Russian aggression before committing to a ceasefire, and believed that without these, Russia's president Vladimir Putin would break any agreement, as he had before.

The meeting was widely criticized for its fiery, confrontational, and antagonistic tone. Nearly all U.S. allies, along with other global figures, swiftly voiced their support for Zelenskyy following the meeting, with many issuing statements that appeared to rebuke Trump's confrontational approach. In contrast, Russian officials praised the outcome of the meeting and directed criticism toward Zelenskyy, while Russian media expressed shock. In the United States, reactions were largely divided along party lines.

In the aftermath of the meeting, the Trump administration suspended the provision of intelligence and military aid to Ukraine for around a week. The aid was resumed after Zelenskyy agreed to an unconditional 30-day ceasefire, contingent on Russian approval; as Russia rejected the proposal, the ceasefire did not ultimately materialize. In a March 2025 YouGov poll, 51% of Americans felt Trump was disrespectful toward Zelenskyy, while 32% felt Zelenskyy was disrespectful toward Trump.

== Background ==
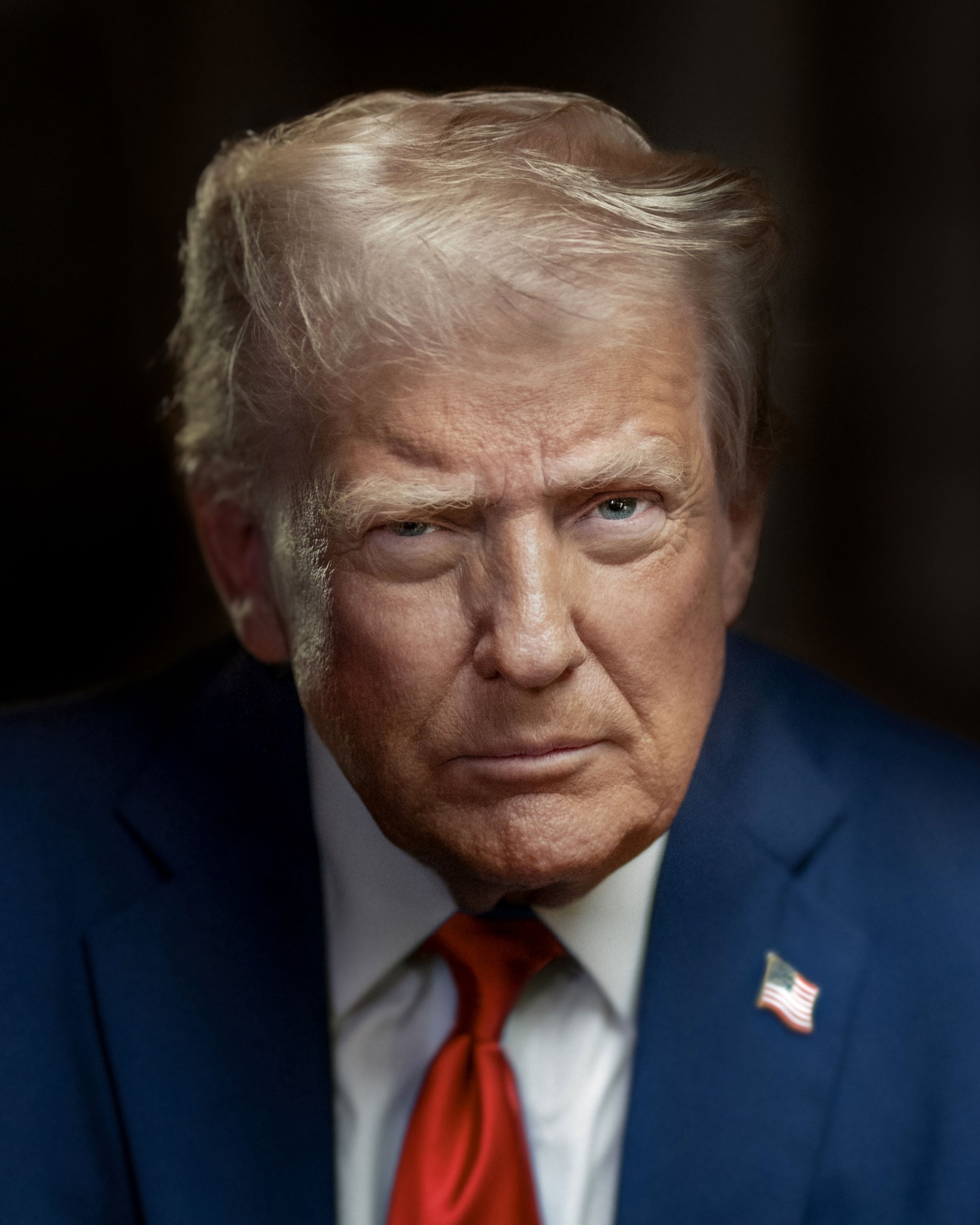
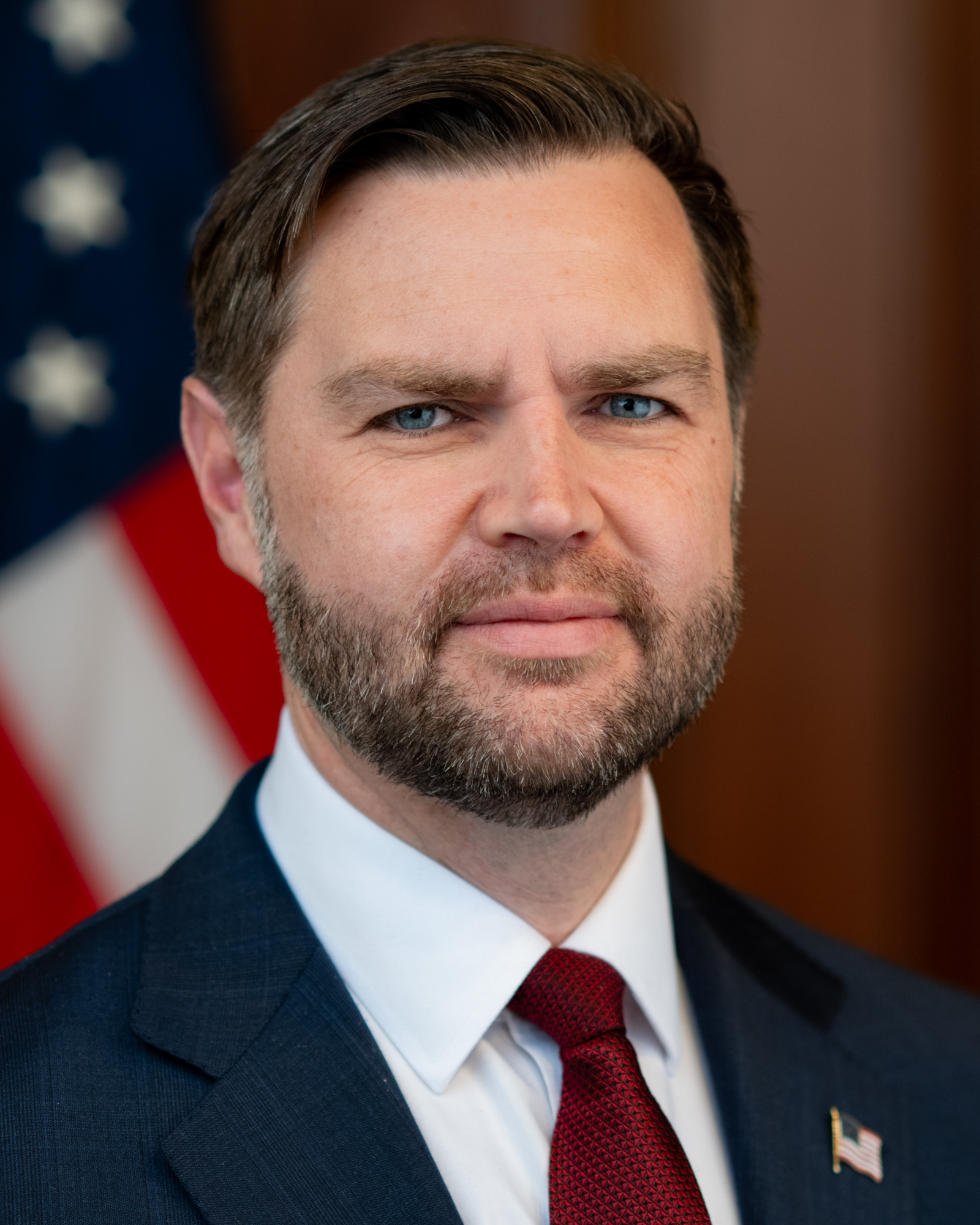
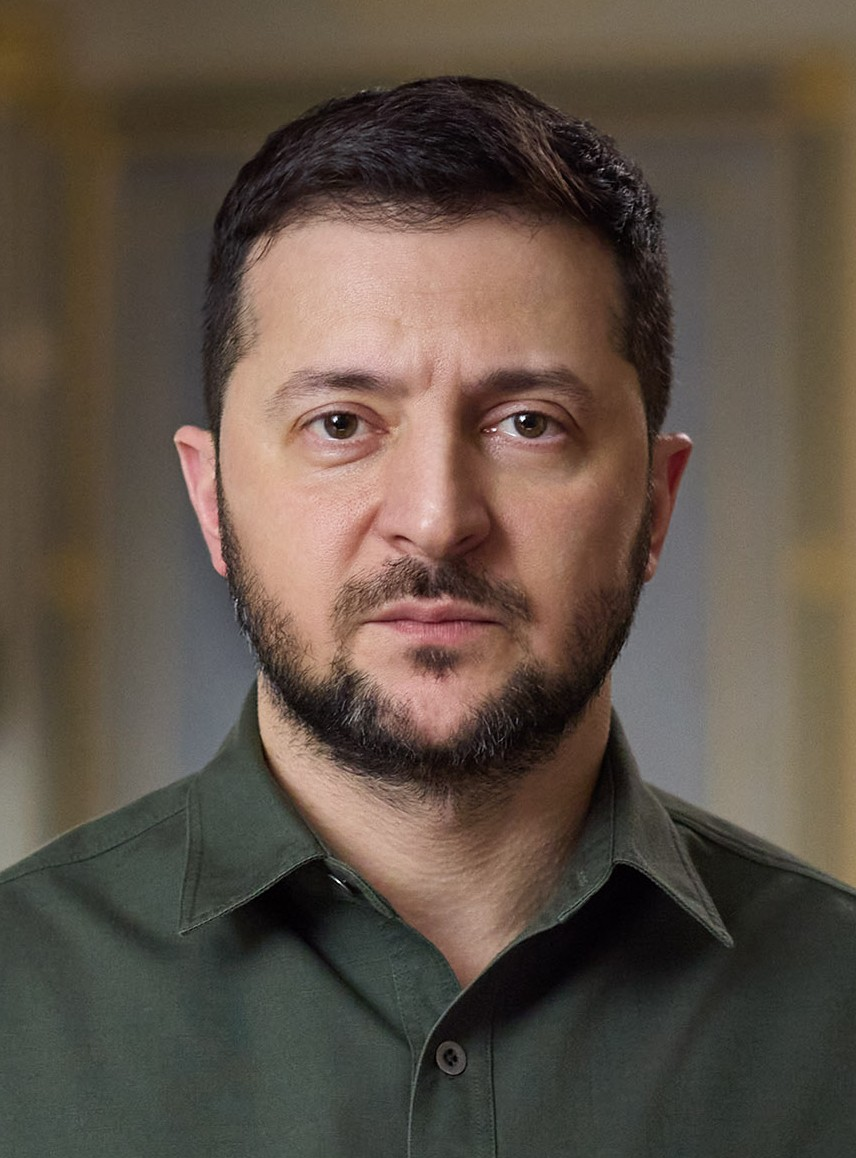
Donald Trump, JD Vance, and Volodymyr Zelenskyy

The meeting took place against the backdrop of the ongoing Russo-Ukrainian war, which began with the 2014 Russian annexation of Crimea and escalated with Russia's full-scale invasion in 2022. By 2025, Ukraine heavily relied on international aid, particularly from Western countries, including the United States under the administration of Joe Biden, to continue its war effort. Zelenskyy, elected in 2019, had consistently sought robust international support to protect Ukraine's sovereignty. Trump has a history of confrontation with Zelenskyy, having been impeached in 2019 for withholding arms shipments to Ukraine in an attempt to coerce the Ukrainian president into investigating Trump's political rival, Joe Biden. Prior to becoming vice president, Vance had been critical of U.S. aid to Ukraine, having stated "I don't really care what happens to Ukraine one way or the other" in a 2022 interview. Zelenskyy described Vance as "too radical" in a 2024 interview after Trump picked him as his running mate in the 2024 presidential election.

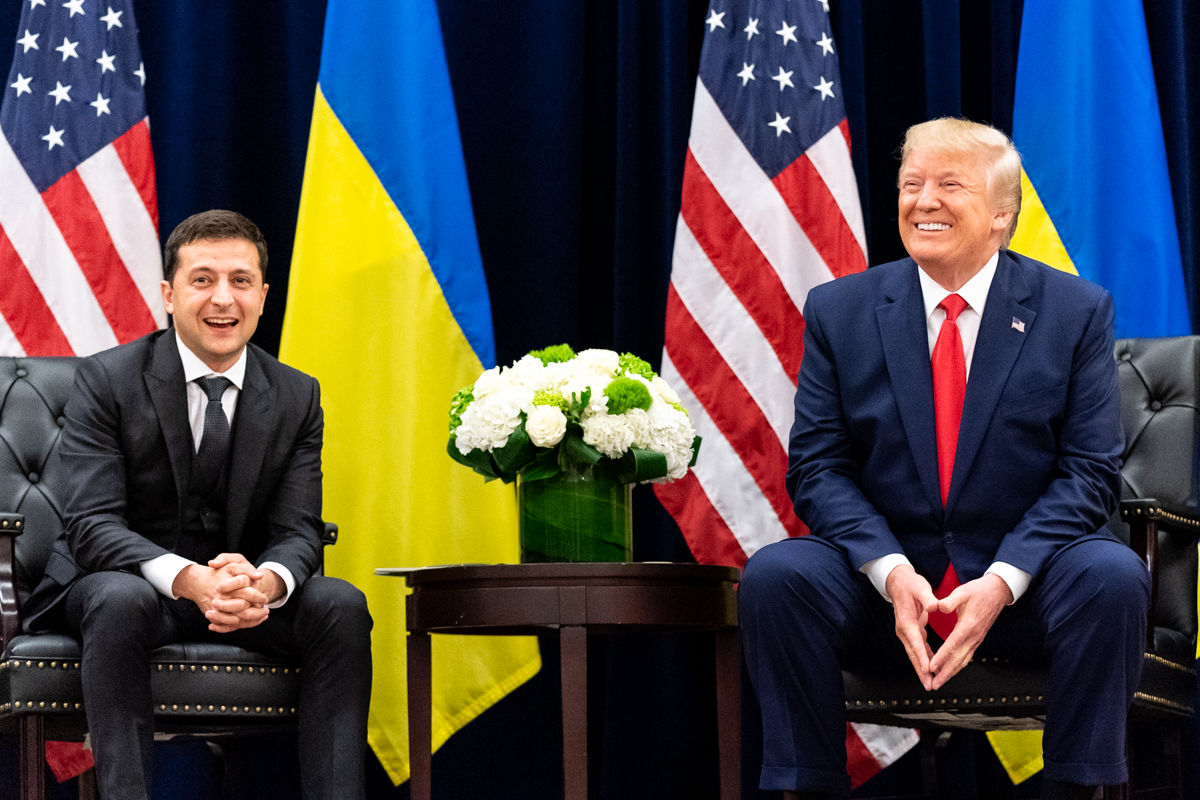
Ukrainian president Volodymyr Zelenskyy and US president Donald Trump in New York City, September 2019

On the first day of his second term, Trump signed an executive order to freeze foreign humanitarian aid to all countries for ninety days, and later defied a court order to lift the freeze. This order impacted USAID, which had pledged $16.4 billion in humanitarian aid to Ukraine in 2023. President Trump had made cutting expenditures to foreign countries a central part of his campaign, and subsequently his presidency. While Trump has claimed "about $350 billion" has been spent on Ukraine, factcheckers have found that $83 billion has been disbursed, $57 billion obligated, and $40 billion appropriated with the Congressional Research Service putting the total appropriation at $182 billion, between 2022 and 2024. The BBC reported that the Kiel Institute for the World Economy calculated that the U.S. spent $119.7 billion "on aid between January 2022 and December 2024", and that the U.S. Department of Defense provided a figure of $182.8 billion for "all spending on Operation Atlantic Resolve – a response to Russia's invasion of Ukraine [...] that covers U.S. military training in Europe and replenishment of U.S. defence stocks." US News says the "total aid commitment [from the United States] is valued at about $128 billion." The United States has given more grants to Ukraine than it has given loans.

Trump had expressed a willingness to negotiate an agreement with Russia to end the Russo-Ukrainian War, reversing a longstanding U.S. policy of isolating Russia after it invaded Ukraine. After he returned to office and initiated a phone call with Russian president Vladimir Putin, the first by an American president since the invasion began, Zelenskyy criticized him and accused Trump of being "caught in a web of disinformation" from Russia. Trump subsequently criticized him on his social media platform, Truth Social, where he accused Ukraine of starting the war and called Zelenskyy a "dictator" for not holding elections – even though the Ukrainian constitution prohibits elections during martial law, which was in effect in Ukraine at the time. The Trump administration aligned with Russia at the United Nations, voting against a European-backed General Assembly resolution on February 24, 2025, to condemn Russia and demand a withdrawal of its troops from Ukraine.

The Trump administration initially intended to cancel Zelenskyy's trip to Washington one week beforehand but was persuaded by French president Emmanuel Macron to proceed with it. The administration urged Ukraine to agree to share revenue from its raw minerals with the United States, and Zelenskyy had reportedly been planning to sign a framework agreement related to raw minerals during his visit. The idea for the agreement was originally proposed by Ukraine to the Biden administration in 2024. In January 2025, Ukraine signed a 100-year partnership with the United Kingdom also involving minerals. Prior to Zelenskyy's meeting with Trump, senator Lindsey Graham told Zelenskyy to focus on the present minerals agreement and to discuss a ceasefire and security guarantees later.

== Meeting ==
The full meeting (disagreements begin after 39:10)

The participants had planned to discuss further support for Ukraine in the context of concluding the framework agreement on minerals. The Ukrainian delegation opted for a mutually beneficial partnership that would provide security guarantees for Ukraine, not just the transfer of its resources. The agreement would have created a joint investment fund to rebuild Ukraine, with the U.S. gaining in the mining of rare-earth minerals. Ukraine had planned to stake half of future revenues from the country's resources and minerals into the fund. Graham and others mediated the deal in an effort to maintain Trump's interest in supporting Ukraine's security while negotiating peace between Putin and Zelenskyy.

Prior to the meeting, officials from Trump's entourage asked Zelenskyy to wear a formal suit for the meeting, which he had not done in public since Russia's invasion. Zelenskyy refused to do so, which reportedly offended Trump.

The meeting was scheduled for 11:00 (UTC−5) in the Oval Office, the U.S. president's office, in the White House. It took place in front of journalists, in an internationally live broadcast event. At approximately 11:20, Zelenskyy arrived at the White House from the Hay–Adams Hotel, where he and his advisors were staying. Trump met him at the entrance to the West Wing. After shaking Zelenskyy's hand, he sarcastically remarked that Zelenskyy was "all dressed up today". During the meeting, Brian Glenn, a pro-Trump reporter and boyfriend of representative Marjorie Taylor Greene, asked Zelenskyy why he was not wearing a suit and that it was disrespectful. Zelenskyy said that he would wear one "after the war is finished". Trump responded that he thought Zelenskyy had "dressed beautifully" and that he "liked his clothing".

It was later revealed that a reporter from TASS, a Russian state-owned news agency, had gained access to the meeting.

=== Discussion ===
The meeting between the two leaders began cordially. Roughly 40 minutes into the meeting, Polskie Radio reporter Marek Wałkuski asked Trump, "I'm talking with my friends in Poland, and they are worried that you align yourself too much with Putin. What's your message for them?" Trump answered the question with, "Well, if I didn't align myself with both of them, you'd never have a deal. [...] I'm not aligned with anybody. I'm aligned with the United States of America, and for the good of the world, I'm aligned with the world." Vance interjected to answer the question on his own, telling Zelenskyy, "The path to peace and the path to prosperity is maybe engaging in diplomacy. [...] What makes America a good country is America engaging in diplomacy. That's what President Trump is doing."

Zelenskyy responded by discussing the history of the Russo-Ukrainian war since 2014; he added that "nobody stopped" Putin. Zelenskyy stated that in 2019, he negotiated a ceasefire with Putin, Macron, and German chancellor Angela Merkel. (Note: Trump was not in the ceasefire meeting, but was informed of it by means of the Trump–Zelenskyy phone call in 2019.) However, Putin later did not abide by the ceasefire or another agreed-upon prisoner exchange. Zelenskyy concluded by asking Vance, "What kind of diplomacy, JD, you are speaking about?"

The conversation then became hostile and continually escalated. Vance replied that he was discussing "diplomacy that's going to end the destruction of Ukraine", telling Zelenskyy, "I think it's disrespectful for you to come to the Oval Office and try to litigate this in front of the American media. Right now, you guys are going around and forcing conscripts to the front lines because you have manpower problems, you should be thanking the president for trying to bring an end to this conflict." Zelenskyy asked if Vance had ever visited Ukraine, telling him, "Come once." Vance replied that he had "watched and seen the stories" regarding Ukraine and accused Zelenskyy of showing a "propaganda tour" of Ukraine; Vance then questioned, "Do you think that it's respectful to come to the Oval Office of the United States of America and attack the administration that is trying to prevent the destruction of your country?"

Zelenskyy told Vance, "First of all, during the war, everybody has problems, even you. But you have nice ocean and don't feel now [sic], but you will feel it in the future. God bless, you will not have war." Trump interrupted, telling Zelenskyy, "You don't know that. Don't tell us what we're going to feel." Trump and Zelenskyy began speaking at the same time, as Zelenskyy asserted, "You will feel influence." Trump declared, "We are going to feel very good and very strong. [...] You don't have the cards right now. With us, you start having cards." Zelenskyy replied, "I'm not playing cards ... I'm very serious ... I'm the president in a war", while Trump retorted, "You're gambling with millions of lives, you are gambling with World War Three [...] and what you're doing is very disrespectful to the country, this country, that's backed you far more than a lot of people said they should have."

Vance questioned if Zelenskyy had ever offered thanks, despite Zelenskyy starting the conversation by verbally thanking Trump. Vance falsely accused Zelenskyy of "[having gone] to Pennsylvania and campaigned for the opposition in October [2024]". (Note: During his visit to the United States, Zelenskyy visited a factory to offer thanks for workers producing ammunition for Ukraine.) When Zelenskyy asked if he could answer, Trump responded, "No, you've done a lot of talking. [...] If you didn't have our military equipment this war would have been over in two weeks." Zelenskyy replied, "In three days, I heard it from Putin." Trump responded, "It's going to be a very hard thing to do business like this", while Vance again asked Zelenskyy to "say thank you", and added to Zelenskyy, "You're wrong."

A journalist raised the hypothetical of Russia violating a ceasefire. Trump responded, "What if anything? What if a bomb drops on your head right now? ... they broke it with Biden because Biden, they didn't respect him. They didn't respect Obama. They respect me." Trump then referenced the Mueller special counsel investigation into him regarding Russian interference in the 2016 United States elections, commenting that Putin "went through a hell of a lot" with him, "went through a phony witch hunt where they used him and Russia." Trump then criticized Joe Biden and his son Hunter, Adam Schiff and Hillary Clinton. Trump told Zelenskyy, "make a deal or we're out ... And if we're out, you'll fight it out. I don't think it's going to be pretty." Trump ultimately stopped the meeting, commenting, "I think we've seen enough. This is going to be great television."

== Aftermath ==
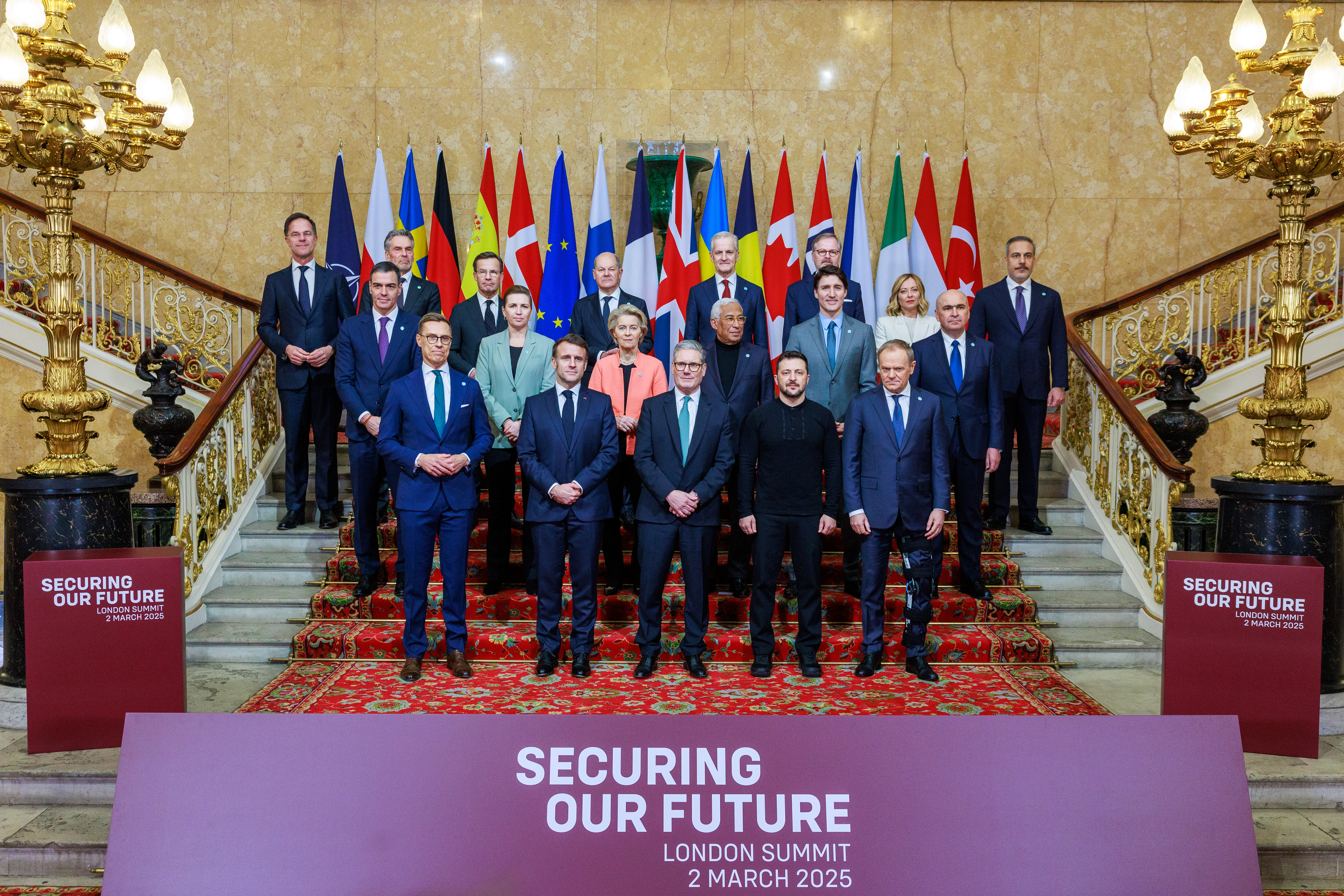
President Zelenskyy and other participants at the 2025 London Summit on Ukraine

The meeting ended without a firm resolution. Trump reportedly consulted Vance, Secretary of State Marco Rubio, Treasury Secretary Scott Bessent, and other top advisers after the exchange and eventually came to the conclusion that Zelenskyy was "not in a place to negotiate". According to The New York Times and CNN, U.S. officials then decided to ask Zelenskyy to leave, with the Ukrainian delegation waiting in the Roosevelt Room while Rubio and National Security Advisor Michael Waltz were sent to deliver the message. Trump canceled a planned joint news conference and the signing of the minerals agreement.

In an interview on Fox News, Waltz later claimed that some Ukrainian representatives were "practically in tears" but Zelenskyy remained "argumentative" when the Ukrainians were asked to leave. A Ukrainian representative suggested arranging another meeting between Trump and Zelenskyy to defuse tensions, but the Americans declined, with Trump later saying it was not convenient. Zelenskyy's motorcade left the White House courtyard at 13:42, returning to the Hay–Adams Hotel.

Zelenskyy visited the United Kingdom after the meeting with Trump to attend a summit with European leaders. A£2.26 billion loan was provided to Ukraine, which would be repaid from frozen Russian assets.

On March 3, the Trump administration suspended military aid to Ukraine. Within a week of the meeting, the Trump administration also suspended provision of intelligence to Ukraine. On March 5, CIA director John Ratcliffe said that there was a "pause" on both "the military front and the intelligence front", while national security adviser Mike Waltz answered a media query regarding intelligence provision that the United States was "pausing, assessing, looking at everything across our security relationship". On March 8, the National Geospatial-Intelligence Agency under the Trump administration said that, in relation to "support to Ukraine", the agency has "suspended access to U.S. government-purchased commercial imagery", while satellite imagery company Maxar Technologies suspended Ukrainian access per the Trump administration's decision. This reportedly had a major impact on the swift Russian advances during the Kursk campaign.

Politico Europe reported on March 6 that Trump's senior aides had covertly met Zelenskyy's Ukrainian political rivals, Yulia Tymoshenko and senior members of Petro Poroshenko's political party, as the Trump aides wanted to review the possibility of soon holding presidential elections in Ukraine, with the aim of ousting Zelenskyy.

On March 11, following a meeting in Jeddah between American and Ukrainian delegations, the Trump administration announced it would resume providing aid and intelligence to Ukraine.

Then-presumptive German Chancellor Friedrich Merz proposed a significant increase in defense spending in Germany, justifying his policy by the "rapidly changing situation", especially after the Trump–Zelenskyy meeting. In March 2025, German lawmakers approved an amendment to the Basic Law, allowing Merz's government to implement the largest rearmament in Germany since World War II.

== Analysis ==
=== United States ===
The meeting made domestic and international headlines, noted for its fiery, confrontational, and antagonistic tone by multiple news outlets. Fox News called it an "explosive confrontation". CNN wrote that "never before has an American president verbally attacked his visitor like Trump did to Zelenskyy"; an article by fact-checker Daniel Dale underlined that Zelenskyy had thanked the U.S. at least 33 times in English since January 2022, despite Trump's and Vance's claims to the contrary, and that this in particular did not include a review of his "many domestic remarks in Ukrainian". CNN journalist Frederik Pleitgen commented: "it is known that Volodymyr Zelenskyy makes every effort to speak English [...] but when two such monster personalities talk to you like that, it could only go wrong." An op-ed by The Washington Post described Trump as sounding "more like Don Corleone than an American president" during the exchange. Late-night hosts also commented on the meeting, with Stephen Colbert saying: "A mere six weeks ago, America defended democracy against autocrats and promoted free and open societies all over the world. Now, we’re on the same pickleball team with Russia".

==== Media analysis ====
The confrontation has been widely reported as a significant new low point in European–United States relations. Alexander Vindman, an expert on European relations and a retired U.S. Army colonel, writes that Trump has "taken Russia’s side against one of Washington’s European partners". The Wall Street Journal described the meeting as "imploding", highlighting its potential to undermine hopes for peace and casting doubt on future U.S. support for Ukraine. NPR commented that American foreign policy under Trump now "downplays alliances and is open for business with any country — depending on what's in it for the United States in the short run". The New York Times highlighted that Trump's aggressive behavior and harsh words towards Zelenskyy shattered the three-year wartime partnership between the United States and Ukraine. The meeting, described as a "shouting match" broadcast to the world, underscored Trump's increasing willingness to sacrifice Ukraine for his broader vision of rebuilding relations with Russia and abandoning traditional alliances. An NBC News analysis suggested that the argument represented "Trump's deep impatience with Ukraine and its democratically elected president, and his persistent defense of Russia's autocratic ruler". Ravi Agrawal, the editor-in-chief of Foreign Policy, commented that Trump had "pushed the boundaries of press attention" and ensured that "a freewheeling discussion was aired out in front of the world's cameras" during every bilateral meeting at the White House. Several columnists suggested that Trump's actions could be seen as aligning with Russian interests and signaling an ongoing shift in U.S. foreign policy away from Atlanticism. The meeting became a massive internet meme online, with filter images of Vance's U.S. senator portrait being inflated to look like an infant became a viral phenomenon in reference to his "give thanks" comment to Zelenskyy. This meme would later be referenced in the South Park episode "Got a Nut".

=== International ===
The Kyiv Post suggested that a "turning point" during the meeting was when Trump described Ukraine as "destroyed", which "seemed to push the Ukrainian president past his limits". Many newspapers in the United Kingdom highlighted the meeting, including The Guardian, which described it as "one of the greatest diplomatic disasters in modern history" and particularly singled out Vance for his role in starting the confrontation. Janet Daley, writing for The Daily Telegraph, described America under Trump as an "imperial plutocracy" in light of the meeting. Canada's CBC News compared the leaders' exchange to the 1959 Kitchen Debate between then-vice president Richard Nixon and Soviet leader Nikita Khrushchev. Spanish newspaper El País highlighted that the confrontation was "all the more surprising" after Trump had "softened his stance" towards Zelenskyy in the days preceding the meeting. ABC News of Australia suggested that the altercation could affect China–Russia relations and serve as a "wake-up call" for Taiwan.

Russian state media expressed shock at the "breakdown in diplomacy" but expressed support for Trump's conduct. News anchor Alexander Kareevsky commented that the meeting "stopped observing the limits of decency" and had not seen any equivalent in "diplomatic history". A correspondent for Russia-24 said "it is clear that there can be no talk of any deliveries or further weapons" to Ukraine, and that Zelenskyy was "leaving with nothing". Margarita Simonyan, the head of Russian state-controlled media outlet RT, commented: "the Oval Office has seen a lot, but never this. We were watching world history live on air right now."

=== Public ===
According to the Associated Press, many ordinary Ukrainians were "unfazed" by the row, but generally agreed that Zelenskyy "had stood up for their country's dignity and interests by firmly maintaining his stance in the face of chiding from some of the world's most powerful men", while some argued that he should have listened to Trump's point of view. Social media commentators in Ukraine sided in favor of Zelenskyy following Glenn's criticism of him not wearing a suit. Ukrainian blogger and journalist Illia Ponomarenko said that Trump would have "found a reason to get offended" even if Zelenskyy had remained silent, adding, "Ukraine is the coolest country in the world right now – again."

Pro-Kremlin political scientist and former close advisor to Vladimir Putin, Sergei Markov, told the Swedish newspaper Dagens Nyheter: "From a psychological point of view, it is certainly pleasant that the Western world is divided. But if you think rationally, this situation is more risky for Russia. We want a peace agreement, but now we see that Ukraine is ready to continue the war." Russian pro-war bloggers voiced their support for Trump and his portrayal of Zelenskyy as "an ungrateful child" on Telegram. Analyst and Kremlin adviser Fyodor Lukyanov described the confrontation as "a fundamental shift", and said that Zelenskyy "underestimated the scale of the shift that took place in American politics" in the Trump era. Anton Grishanov, a researcher at a think-tank affiliated with the Russian Foreign Ministry, said the meeting was a "tragicomic" discussion which would "undoubtedly weaken Zelenskyy's position within Ukraine and give Russian diplomacy additional leverage in its dealings with the US".

==== Protests ====
In the United States, protests in support of Ukraine and Zelenskyy occurred in New York City, Boston, and Los Angeles. In Waitsfield, Vermont, where Vance was vacationing with his family, protesters lined a road to express criticism of him and support for Ukraine. On Zelenskyy's arrival in the United Kingdom the day after the meeting, crowds cheered him at 10 Downing Street as he shook hands with Starmer.

== Reactions ==
=== Political ===
==== Ukraine ====
===== Zelenskyy and presidency =====
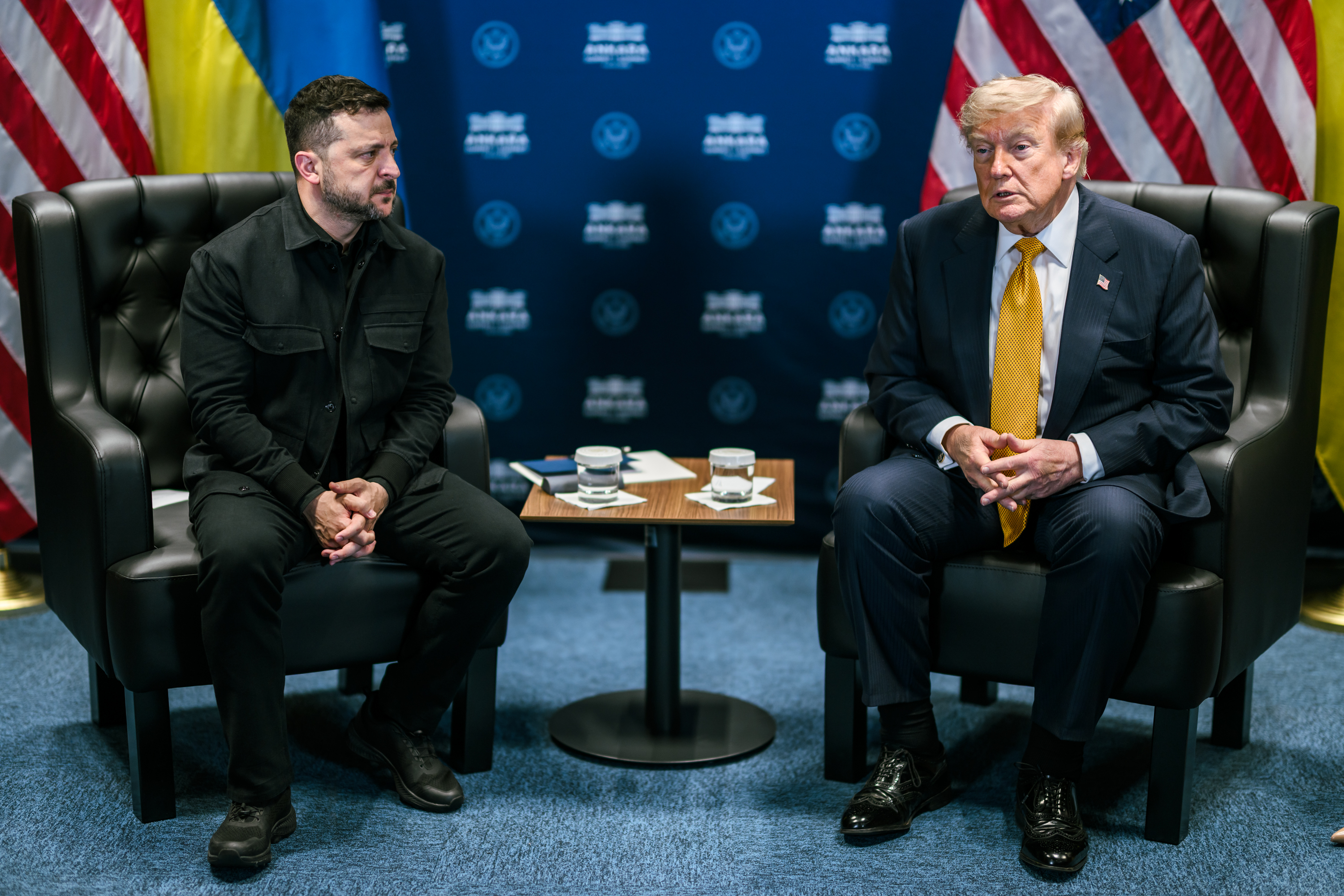
President Trump and President Zelenskyy during a NATO summit in July 2026

Zelenskyy issued an initial statement on social media following the meeting, thanking Trump, the United States Congress, and the American people for their support. He added: "Ukraine needs just and lasting peace, and we are working exactly for that." In a later interview with Bret Baier of Fox News, he described the meeting as a "kind of spat" which was "not good for both sides" and refused to apologize to Trump. He did, however, express interest in repairing their relationship. After various global leaders expressed their support for him, Zelenskyy responded to each leader's message individually with: "Thank you for your support." Andriy Yermak, the head of the Presidential Office who sat with Zelenskyy during the meeting, said that security was "not just a word. It means life, a future without sirens, without losses, without fear for our loved ones", and expressed gratitude for United States support for Ukraine.

Zelenskyy later issued a lengthier statement again thanking the United States for its support and expressing his hope for "strong relations with America" and the Trump administration. He also stated that he was still interested in signing the minerals deal.

===== Government =====
Prime Minister Denys Shmyhal backed Zelenskyy and agreed with him, saying "peace without guarantees is not possible". He warned that a "ceasefire without guarantees" would lead to "Russian occupation of the entire European continent". Deputy Prime Minister Oleksiy Kuleba described Zelenskyy's actions as "unwavering commitment to Ukraine's interests and devotion to his country". Deputy Prime Minister Mykhailo Fedorov described the confrontation as "another Putin trap" which "failed", and praised Zelenskyy "for the courage to call things by their proper names, and to defend our people's honour". Foreign minister Andrii Sybiha said on social media that Zelenskyy had "the bravery and strength to stand up for what is right", adding that Ukraine has "always been and will continue to be grateful to America for its support".

===== Other =====
Oleh Syniehubov, the governor of Kharkiv Oblast, and Serhiy Lysak, the governor of Dnipropetrovsk Oblast, commended Zelenskyy's conduct. Oleksandr Syrskyi, the commander-in-chief of the Armed Forces of Ukraine, who rarely comments on political matters, reaffirmed the armed forces' support for Zelenskyy and emphasized the need for unity.

A prominent politician, Mustafa Nayyem, who served in Zelenskyy's government, said that the Trump administration "doesn't just dislike us. They despise us .... as a country". Oleksandr Merezhko, the chair of the Foreign Affairs Committee of the Verkhovna Rada (Ukraine's legislature) said that the Rada backed Zelenskyy, and said he did not believe that Trump would propose a plan appeasing Russia. Inna Sovsun, a people's deputy belonging to the Holos party, expressed her shock at the events but said, "Under no circumstances should we agree to calls for the president to resign, and I'm saying that as an opposition MP. That defies the very idea of democracy." She added that Ukraine needed to find another mediator to negotiate with the United States.

==== United States ====
===== Trump administration =====
Following the meeting, Trump issued a statement on his platform Truth Social describing the meeting as "very meaningful", helping him determine that Zelenskyy was "not ready for Peace if America is involved, because he feels our involvement gives him a big advantage in negotiations". During a brief press availability, he claimed Zelenskyy "overplayed his hand", thus prolonging the Russo-Ukrainian war. He later suggested Zelenskyy "wants to come back right now".

Members of Trump's cabinet publicly supported him on social media and in television interviews. Rubio expressed support for Trump's actions and refused to blame Russia for the war, saying he was "not going to fall into this trap of who is bad and who's evil". Waltz alleged that Zelenskyy had heard from Trump's predecessor Joe Biden, "as long as it takes, as much as it takes, blank check", and that he had "not gotten the memo that this is a new sheriff in town". He denied that Trump or Vance ambushed the Ukrainian president. Bessent described Zelenskyy's response as "one of the great diplomatic own goals in history". Deputy chief of staff Stephen Miller called the exchange "one of the great moments in the history of American diplomacy". Karoline Leavitt, the White House press secretary, described Zelenskyy as "rude" and "antagonistic". Elon Musk, the head of Trump's Department of Government Efficiency, wrote that Zelenskyy "destroyed himself in the eyes of the American people". Director of National Intelligence Tulsi Gabbard accused Zelenskyy of "drag[ging] the United States into a nuclear war with Russia/WW3 for years" and thanked Trump for his "unwavering leadership".

===== Republican Party =====
House Speaker Mike Johnson, who belongs to Trump's Republican Party, stated that the "days of America being taken advantage of and disrespected are OVER". During an interview, Senate majority leader John Thune said the exchange was "spirited" but expressed his support for a "peaceful resolution" which favored Ukrainian sovereignty. Senate majority whip John Barrasso supported Trump, saying that Zelenskyy's "behavior in the Oval Office today set back efforts to secure peace for his nation". Chuck Grassley, the president pro tempore of the Senate, described Putin as "an imperialistic dictator" but said that Trump was in charge of bilateral negotiations.

Most Republican senators supported Trump and Vance, including Mike Lee, who praised the two "for standing up to our country and putting America first", and Jim Banks, who accused Zelenskyy of "ungratefully expect[ing] us to bankroll and escalate another forever war–all while disrespecting the President" and "working Americans". Graham described the outcome as a "complete, utter disaster" and criticized Zelenskyy, saying he had "never been more proud" of Trump, who he said was "in a very good mood" during the meeting. Graham also suggested that Zelenskyy should resign, which the latter rejected. Senator Bill Hagerty, who served as U.S. Ambassador to Japan during Trump's first term, also supported Trump, tweeting, "The United States of America will no longer be taken for granted. The contrast between the last four years and now could not be more clear." Josh Hawley, the senior senator from Missouri, called for "accountability" in reference to U.S. financial assistance to Ukraine. Representative Victoria Spartz, a Ukrainian-American, accused Zelenskyy of "doing a serious disservice to the Ukrainian people insulting the American President and the American people – just to appease Europeans and increase his low polling in Ukraine after he failed miserably to defend his country."

Conversely, representative Don Bacon, a moderate Republican, said that the events were a "bad day for America's foreign policy" and that Ukraine wanted "to be part of the West. Russia hates us and our Western values. We should be clear that we stand for freedom." Representative Brian Fitzpatrick described the turn of events as "heartbreaking" and expressed optimism that Trump and Zelenskyy would return to a future discussion to find a "mutually agreeable solution". Representative Mike Lawler pointed out the meeting was "a missed opportunity for both the United States and Ukraine" and described the exchange between the leaders as "a disaster — especially for Ukraine". Former representative Adam Kinzinger, who served on the House Select Committee on the January 6 Attack, said, "I hate to say this ... but the United States right now is not the good guys in this." Susan Collins, the senior senator from Maine, criticized the "deterioration of the discussion among President Trump, Vice President Vance, and President Zelenskyy" and advocated a "more productive meeting to advance the cause of a just and lasting peace for the people of Ukraine, who have been so brutally attacked by Vladimir Putin". Lisa Murkowski, the senior senator from Alaska, also rebuked the Trump administration for "walking away from our allies and embracing Putin", which she said made her "sick to her stomach".

===== Democratic Party =====
Lawmakers of the Democratic Party defended Zelenskyy and condemned Trump's and Vance's behavior. Senate minority leader Chuck Schumer commented that Trump and Vance were "doing Putin's dirty work" and added that the Democrats would "never stop fighting for freedom and democracy". House minority leader Hakeem Jeffries called the exchange "appalling", and said that the United States "must not reward Russian aggression". Representative Gregory Meeks, who sits on the House Foreign Affairs Committee, described Trump as "an existential danger", "a petulant child that demands displays of loyalty in court, and a tyrant with sympathies for autocrats and dictators, so long as they stroke his ego or enrich him and his family". Meeks added that Trump's actions "insulted the generations of Americans who fought and died to build America's standing in the world".

Adam Schiff, the junior senator from California, said: "A hero and a coward are meeting in the Oval Office today. And when the meeting is over, the hero will return home to Ukraine." Amy Klobuchar, the senior senator from Minnesota, wrote that the Ukrainian president had thanked the U.S. "over and over again" and that the Americans owed him thanks for having "stood up to a dictator, buried their own & stopped Putin from marching right into the rest of Europe". Sheldon Whitehouse, the junior senator from Rhode Island, who met with Zelenskyy earlier in the day, also accused Trump and Vance of "acting like ventriloquist dummies for Putin". Mark Kelly, the senior senator from Arizona, described the meeting's outcome as a "gift" for Putin, saying that he "and his cronies are probably popping champagne bottles right now". Senator Bernie Sanders, an independent who caucuses with the Democrats, described calls for Zelenskyy to resign as a "horrific suggestion".

Fourteen Democratic governors issued a joint statement condemning Zelenskyy's treatment. The governors criticized Trump and Vance for using the "sacred Oval Office to berate President Zelenskyy for not trusting Vladimir Putin's word".

==== Russia ====
Former president, former prime minister and deputy chairman of the Security Council Dmitry Medvedev praised the incident, tweeting that the "insolent pig finally got a proper slap down in the Oval Office", and agreeing with Trump's point of view. In a separate post on Telegram, Medvedev said that Zelenskyy had received a "fierce scolding in the Oval Office" and called him an "ungrateful swine". He urged Trump to suspend military aid to Ukraine. Foreign Ministry spokesperson Maria Zakharova also wrote on Telegram: "How Trump and Vance exercised restraint and didn't punch this scumbag is a miracle of restraint." In an official statement on the Foreign Ministry website, Zakharova echoed Trump's view and accused Zelenskyy of "ugly and boorish behavior".

Senator Konstantin Kosachev, a deputy speaker of the Federation Council, said that Zelenskyy "lost this round with a deafening crash. And he will have to crawl on his knees for the next one". Senator Aleksey Pushkov commented that the Trump administration would "now start looking more closely at other candidates for Ukraine's presidency".

==== Other countries ====
===== Governments =====
- Australia – Prime Minister Anthony Albanese voiced his support for Ukraine and called on Russia to end its invasion.
- Austria – Acting Chancellor Alexander Schallenberg reaffirmed his support for Ukraine. A statement by the foreign ministry said, "Russia is the aggressor and we share Ukraine's commitment to a comprehensive, just and lasting peace!"
- Belgium – Prime Minister Bart De Wever voiced his support for Ukraine, stating, "Their fight is our fight. United, we are strong."
- Brazil – President Luiz Inácio Lula da Silva remarked that Zelenskyy was "humiliated" by Trump, saying that "diplomacy, since planet Earth was created, since diplomacy was created, has not seen a scene as grotesque, as disrespectful as the one that took place in the Oval Office of the White House".
- Bulgaria – Prime Minister Rosen Zhelyazkov tweeted, "Ukraine, be brave, be strong. We stand by you." President Rumen Radev, an opponent of Western aid to Ukraine, described Zhelyazkov's stance as a "losing position" and said the meeting was between what he alleged was Trump demanding "an immediate end to the senseless bloodshed" and Zelenskyy wanting "to continue the war at all costs".
- Canada – Prime Minister Justin Trudeau and Foreign Affairs Minister Mélanie Joly commented on the meeting, supporting Ukraine, without commenting on Trump.
- China – Foreign Ministry spokesperson Lin Jian said: "China will continue to play a constructive role for the political settlement of the Ukraine crisis and the realization of peace."
- Croatia – Prime Minister Andrej Plenković affirmed that they stand "firm" in their belief that Ukraine needs "a peace that means sovereignty, territorial integrity, and a secure Europe".
- Cyprus – The Ministry of Foreign Affairs released a statement saying that Cyprus remains committed to supporting Ukraine and that ongoing dialogue is essential.
- Czech Republic – Prime Minister Petr Fiala said that Europe was facing "a historic test" and needed to protect itself against foreign threats, calling for increased military spending by European countries. He added, "If we don't increase our effort fast enough and let the aggressor [Russia] dictate its conditions, we won't end up well." President Petr Pavel voiced his country's support for Ukraine and called on Europe "to step up its efforts".
- Denmark – Prime Minister Mette Frederiksen voiced her support for Zelenskyy. Her predecessor and foreign minister Lars Løkke Rasmussen wrote on Facebook: "There must be room for robust conversations – even between friends. But when it happens in front of rolling cameras like that, there is only one winner. And he sits in the Kremlin."
- Estonia – Foreign minister Margus Tsahkna said: "The only obstacle to peace is Putin's decision to continue his war of aggression. If Russia stops fighting, there will be no war. If Ukraine stops fighting, there will be no Ukraine. Estonia's support to Ukraine remains unwavering."
- Finland – Prime Minister Petteri Orpo reaffirmed Finland's strong support for Ukraine, stating, "Finland and the Finnish people stand firmly with Ukraine. We will continue our unwavering support and work towards a just and lasting peace." President Alexander Stubb expressed shock and disappointment over the events, calling them unprecedented in the history of international diplomacy. "It was a diplomatic failure with only one winner, who wasn't even present: Vladimir Putin", Stubb remarked.
- France – President Emmanuel Macron called Russia an "aggressor" and Ukraine an "assaulted people" and said that France and its allies were "right to help Ukraine and sanction Russia three years ago and to continue doing so". He made a particular nod to Trump's comment during the meeting: "If anyone is gambling with World War III, his name is Vladimir Putin."
- Georgia – Prime Minister Irakli Kobakhidze said that the reactions to the meeting showed that the "deep state and the Global War Party, who want to fight until the last Ukrainian, will not give up on waging war so easily". Kobakhidze emphasized the negative effects of the positions of "the Brussels bureaucrats and speakers like Jeanne Shaheen". He expressed hope that Trump and his "peaceful initiatives" would prevail, because "the sooner the war in Ukraine ends, the fewer Ukrainians will die and the sooner the peace will prevail". He wished Trump "endurance and courage in this difficult struggle".
- Germany – Chancellor Olaf Scholz reiterated Germany's commitment to Ukraine's sovereignty and condemned Russia's ongoing aggression. He added "no one wants peace more than the citizens of Ukraine". Foreign minister Annalena Baerbock said Trump's conduct represented a "new era of ruthlessness" and called on European countries to "defend the rules-based international order and the strength of law more than ever against the power of the strongest".
- Greece – Foreign Minister Giorgos Gerapetritis, during his meeting with U.S. secretary of state Marco Rubio on the same day, expressed Europe's support for a fair solution for Ukraine.
- Hungary – Prime Minister Viktor Orbán sided with Trump and commended his stance on peace.
- Iceland – Prime Minister Kristrún Frostadóttir and Foreign Minister Þorgerður Katrín Gunnarsdóttir voiced their support for Ukraine.
- Republic of Ireland – Taoiseach Micheál Martin said, "We've got to hold our nerve in Europe. We've got to get behind Ukraine, engage with the United States and others, with a view to giving Ukraine the security that it requires." Simon Harris, the Tánaiste and minister for foreign affairs, tweeted, "Ukraine is not to blame for this war brought about by Russia's illegal invasion. We stand with Ukraine."
- Italy – Prime Minister Giorgia Meloni stressed the importance of unity and called for an emergency summit between European countries, the United States and Ukraine. She emphasized that any division within the West weakens all and benefits those who wish to see the decline of Western civilization. Deputy Prime Minister Matteo Salvini voiced his support for Trump and called on him to "stop this war".
- Japan – Prime Minister Shigeru Ishiba emphasized that diplomacy is not about letting emotions clash, it is about "patience and compassion", so that peace can be achieved. He stated that Japan would "do everything it can to prevent division between the United States, Ukraine and the Group of Seven nations".
- Latvia – Prime Minister Evika Siliņa and President Edgars Rinkēvičs voiced their support for Ukraine.
- Lithuania – Prime Minister Gintautas Paluckas and President Gitanas Nausėda voiced their support for Ukraine.
- Luxembourg – Prime Minister Luc Frieden voiced his support for Ukraine.
- Moldova – President Maia Sandu reaffirmed Moldova's steadfast support for Ukraine. Sandu stated: "The truth is simple. Russia invaded Ukraine. Russia is the aggressor. Ukraine defends its freedom—and ours. We stand with Ukraine."
- Montenegro – President Jakov Milatović reaffirmed Montenegro's support of "a just and lasting peace in Ukraine" and that the country "stands with its people in their pursuit of peace".
- Netherlands – Prime Minister Dick Schoof said that the Dutch cabinet unconditionally supported Ukraine. Foreign Minister Caspar Veldkamp called his Ukrainian colleague Andrii Sybiha and promised Dutch support.
- New Zealand – Prime Minister Christopher Luxon said that his country remained "steadfast in its support for Ukraine as it defends itself in a war that Russia started", and called on Russia to end its invasion.
- Norway – Prime Minister Jonas Gahr Støre described the meeting as "serious and disheartening", in particular saying that Trump's accusation that Zelenskyy was "gambling with World War III" was "deeply unreasonable and a statement I distance myself from".
- Poland – Prime Minister Donald Tusk, who previously met with Trump as President of the European Council, expressed support for Zelenskyy and Ukraine, writing on social media: "Dear @ZelenskyyUa, dear Ukrainian friends, you are not alone." Tusk was the first world leader to comment about the event on social media. President Andrzej Duda, a supporter of both Ukraine and Trump, said that Zelenskyy "should return to this table, sit calmly at this table, remain calm, negotiate a solution that will make Ukraine safe".
- Portugal – Prime Minister Luís Montenegro expressed support for Ukraine. In a message directed to Zelenskyy, Montenegro stated: "Ukraine can always count on Portugal."
- Romania – Acting President Ilie Bolojan stressed Ukraine's importance to European security, stating: "The security of Ukraine is crucial for the security of Europe. We all need to stand together to fight for our values, freedom, and peace."
- Slovakia – Prime Minister Robert Fico stated that Slovakia would refuse to provide financial and military support to Ukraine and called for a ceasefire, which he said Zelenskyy and a large number of EU member states rejected. He also called for the restoration of Russian gas transit to Slovakia and Western Europe. President Peter Pellegrini called on the European Union to "behave responsibly and, above all, actively in this tense situation". He added "that the current leadership of Ukraine will take a constructive approach to the solution that will emerge from joint talks of the transatlantic community and launch constructive negotiations on establishing peace between the two enemies".
- Slovenia – Prime Minister Robert Golob reaffirmed Slovenia's strong support for Ukraine, stating, "Russia is an aggressor, and Ukraine is under attack. Ukraine is not only fighting for itself but for the security of all of Europe. We will continue to support and assist Ukraine until a just and lasting peace is achieved." President Nataša Pirc Musar condemned the events, stating, "We stand firmly in support of Ukraine's sovereignty. We repeat, Russia is the aggressor. It is time for Europe to take the lead on the path to peace in Ukraine."
- Spain – Prime Minister Pedro Sánchez voiced his support for Ukraine, calling for a "just and lasting peace" and criticizing Trump's conduct.
- Sweden – The office of Prime Minister Ulf Kristersson expressed support for Ukraine and stated: "You are not only fighting for your freedom but also for all of Europe's."
- Switzerland – President Karin Keller-Sutter reaffirmed Switzerland's stance, stating that the country remains "firmly committed to supporting a just and lasting peace, while condemning Russia's aggression against a sovereign state."
- United Kingdom – Prime Minister Keir Starmer reiterated his country's "unwavering support" for Ukraine.

===== Former leaders and other political parties =====
- European Union – The Renew Europe group reiterated its support for Ukraine in a statement released following the meeting. Valérie Hayer, president of the group in the European Parliament, condemned the "insulting attitude and remarks" from Trump and called for "immediate and decisive European action to support Ukraine, including bold European defense".
- France – In an interview, former president François Hollande stated, "Even if the American people remain our friends, the Trump administration itself is no longer our ally." He emphasized that recent events indicated a possible "divorce" between Europe and the United States in the near future. Marine Le Pen, leader of the National Rally, described the exchange as a "slap in the face" for Europe but added the manner in which it occurred "did not particularly surprise" her. During an interview with BFM TV, Éric Zemmour, a far-right candidate in the 2022 French presidential election, suggested that Zelenskyy "made a psychological mistake" and denied that Trump attacked him.
- Georgia – Fifth president Salome Zourabichvili voiced her support for Ukraine in a statement posted on social media, which said, "Those who understand what it means to defend one's territory, independence, and freedom—not once, but repeatedly over the past two centuries—are siding with you, Mr. President." She also criticized Trump, remarking: "Not sure this is a demonstration of America First [...] looks more like America seconding Putin's Russia. At a time when we all need a strong America alongside a stronger Europe. It seems we are finally seeing the latter emerge!" Additionally, in response to former French diplomat Gérard Araud, Zourabichvili condemned Glenn's "mocking" question to Zelenskyy about his attire, praising the Ukrainian leader for standing firm and securing support from leaders of the European Union.
- Germany – Friedrich Merz, the concurrent German opposition leader who is expected to become the next Chancellor, vowed to stand with Ukraine "in good and in testing times." Merz also stated, "We must never confuse aggressor and victim in this terrible war." Tino Chrupalla, a co-leader of the far-right Alternative for Germany, called for peace but described Zelenskyy as "beggarly".
- Maldives – Former president Mohamed Nasheed criticized the United States, saying in a statement: "The sooner that Europe realises the U.S. can no longer be trusted, the better it will be for the Free World. Europe and the countries of the Commonwealth must rise to the occasion, including making joint military alliances."
- Moldova – Former president Igor Dodon described it as a "[missed] chance to stop the war" and warned for "even greater human casualties, with huge economic losses" and called Ukraine to "return to negotiations".
- Netherlands – Several politicians, including Dilan Yeşilgöz and Pieter Omtzigt, showed their respect for Zelenskyy and several opposition parties, including GroenLinks–PvdA and Democrats 66, criticized Trump's behavior. Geert Wilders, leader of the Party for Freedom, described the meeting as "Fascinating TV, but not necessarily the best way to end a war, gentlemen."
- United Kingdom – Former prime minister Boris Johnson said that "cool heads" should prevail and praised Zelenskyy's leadership, adding both Ukraine and the United States were "on the same side". Conservative Party and opposition leader Kemi Badenoch expressed sympathy for Zelenskyy during an appearance on Sunday with Laura Kuenssberg, but said she did not believe the exchange between him and Trump was an ambush. Her shadow ministers criticized the meeting, with Alicia Kearns denouncing it as "performative bullying". Nigel Farage, the leader of Reform UK, emphasized the need for Ukraine to have the right security guarantees, calling the altercation in the Oval Office "regrettable" and saying that it would "make Putin feel like the winner". Stephen Gethins, the foreign affairs spokesman for the Scottish National Party, said that the invitation for Trump to visit Scotland from King Charles III – in a letter which had been given to Trump by Starmer in his visit the day before – should be reconsidered unless he showed more support for Ukraine.

=== International and non-governmental organizations ===
- Amnesty International – The human rights organization released a statement saying, "Nothing that was said today in the Oval Office changes the facts: Russia's full-scale invasion of Ukraine was an act of aggression and a manifest violation of the UN Charter." It added that "sustainable peace in Ukraine is only possible through justice and accountability for all crimes under international law committed since 2014".
- Council of Europe – Secretary General Alain Berset voiced his support for Ukraine, stating, "Ukrainians can count on Strasbourg".
- European Union – European Commission President Ursula von der Leyen, European Council President António Costa, and European Parliament President Roberta Metsola released a joint statement lauding Zelenskyy's "dignity and bravery," reaffirming the European Union's unwavering commitment to Ukraine's sovereignty and territorial integrity. They also assured him that he was "never alone" and urged him to "be strong, be brave, be fearless." Additionally, EU High Representative for Foreign Affairs and Security Policy Kaja Kallas criticized Trump's approach, stating that "the free world needs a new leader" and underscoring Europe's resolve to back Ukraine amidst ongoing Russian aggression. On March 4, Ursula von der Leyen proposed ReArm Europe, a five-point plan to boost defense spending by up to €800 billion, including €150 billion in loans to EU member states.
- NATO – Secretary General Mark Rutte described the outcome of the meeting as "very unfortunate", but urged Zelenskyy "to restore his relationship" with Trump and his administration.

== Gallery ==
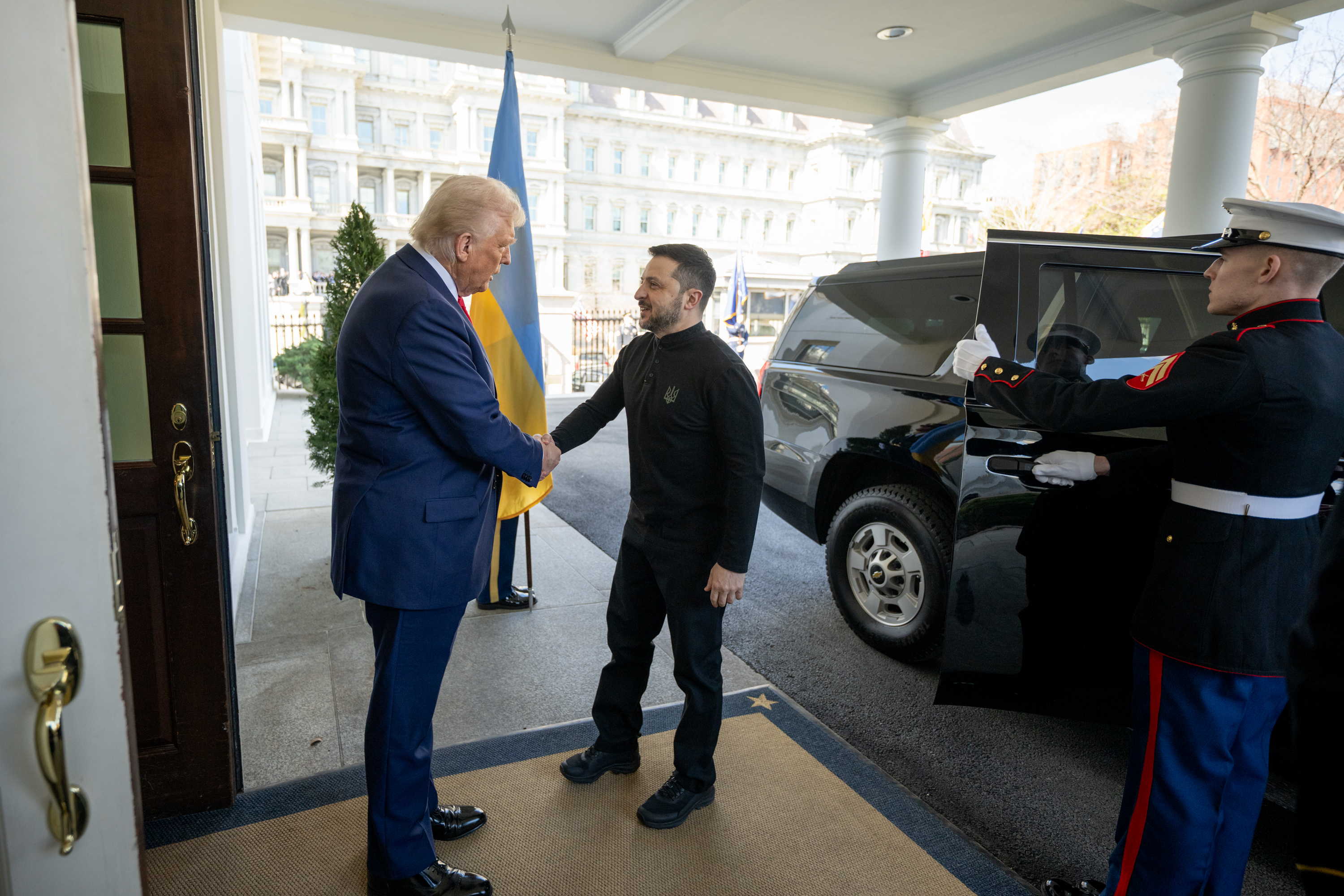
President Trump greets President Zelenskyy upon arriving to the Oval Office

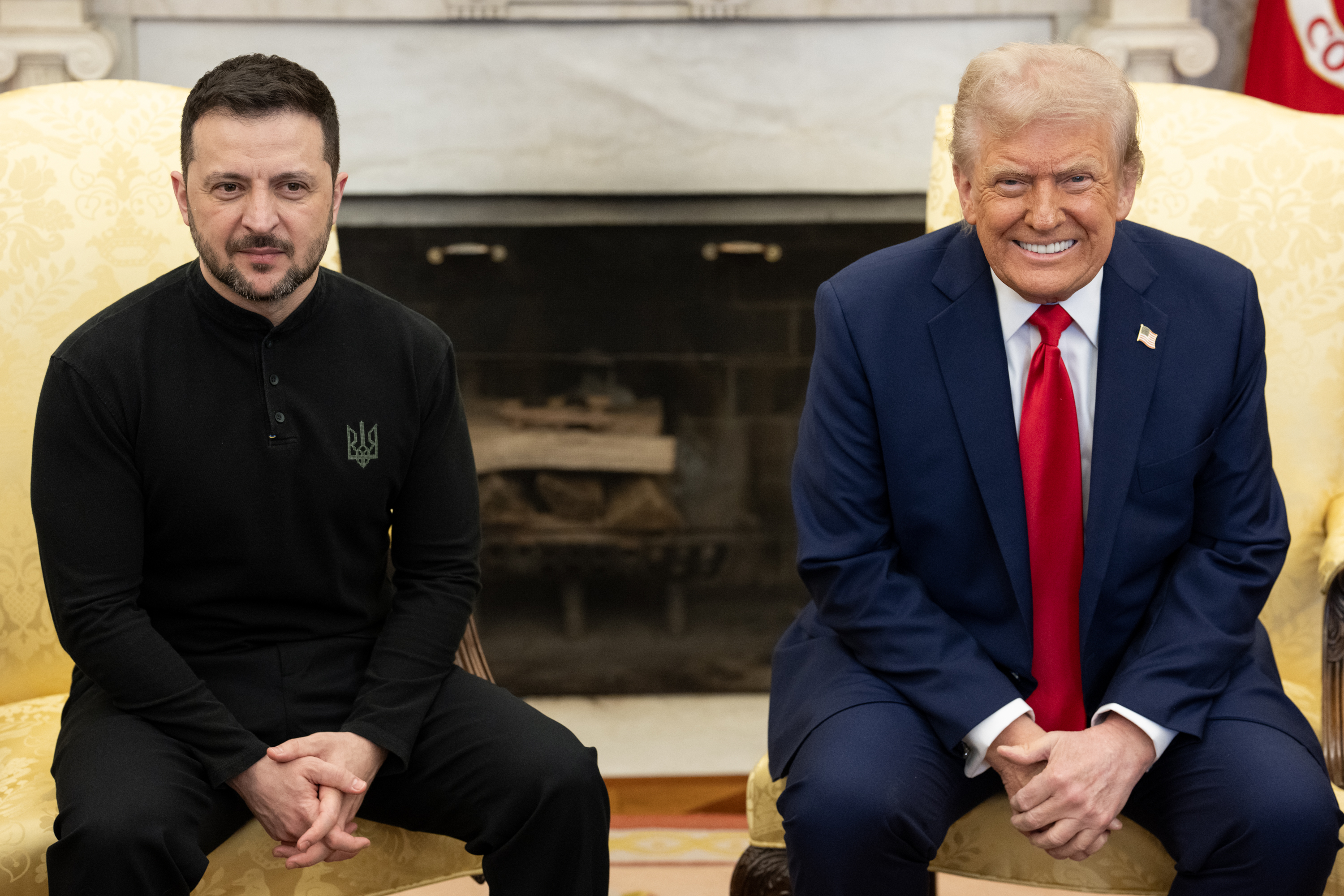
President Trump and President Zelenskyy posing for a photo

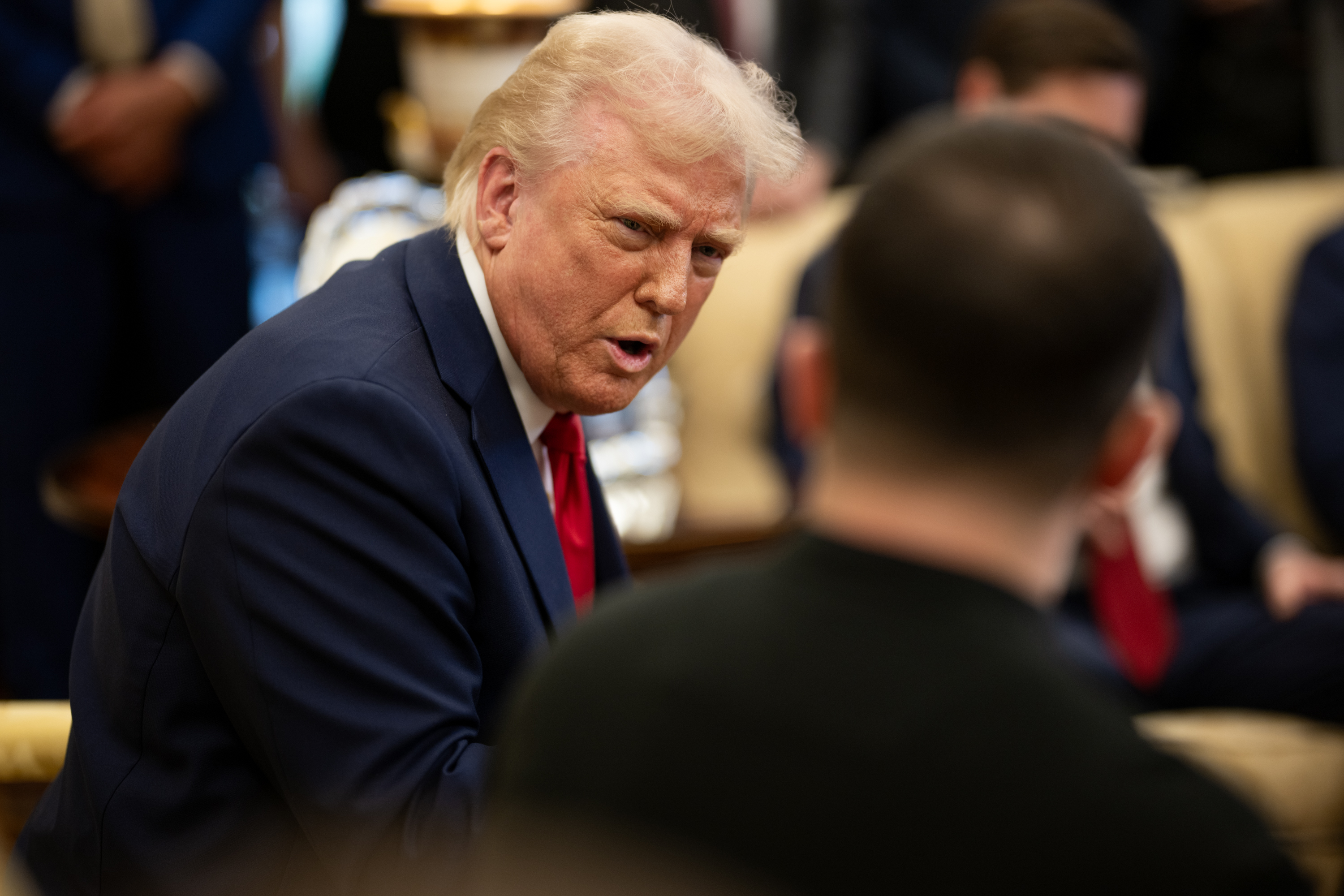
President Trump conversing with President Zelenskyy

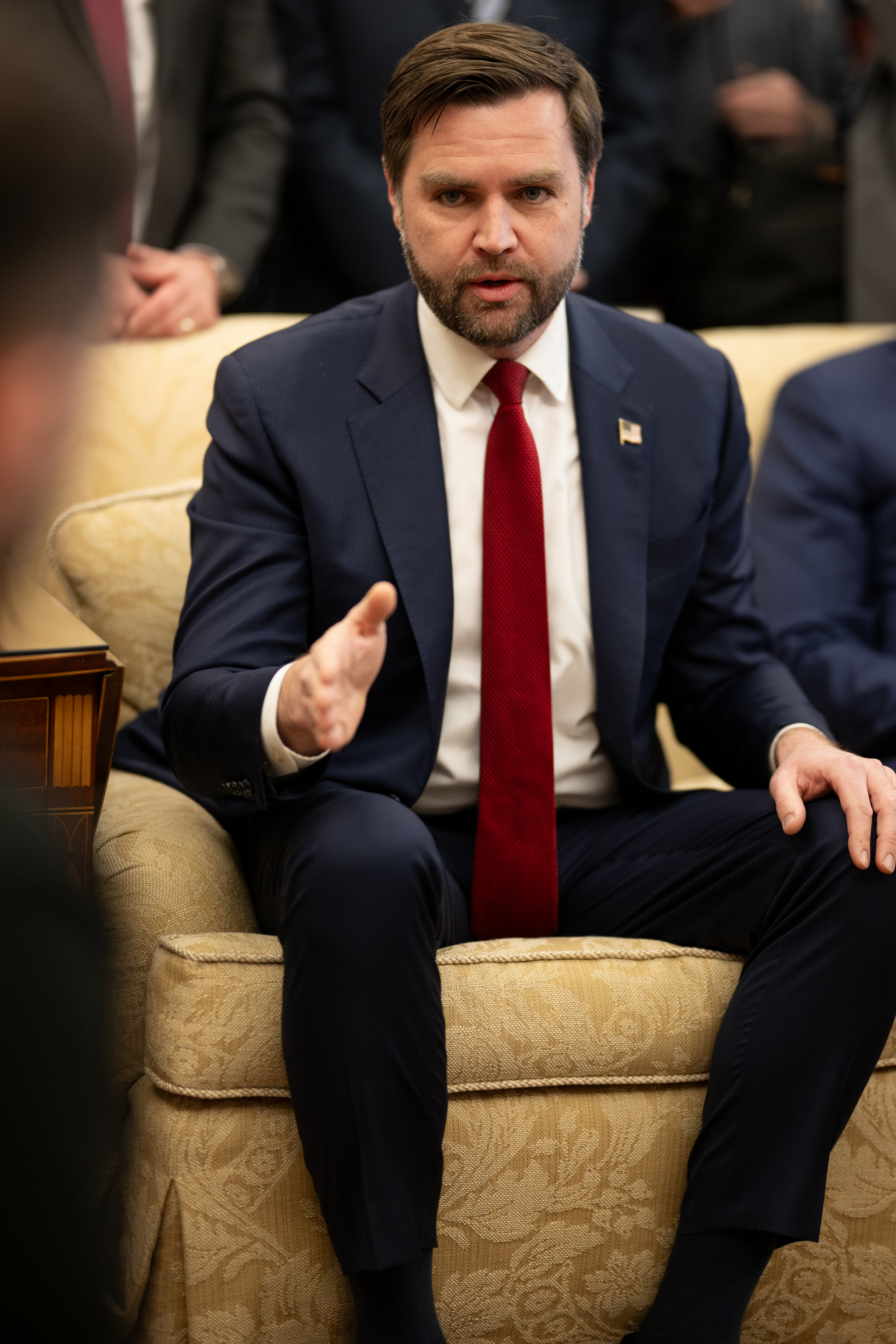
Vice President Vance conversing with President Zelenskyy

== See also ==
- 1960 U-2 incident – Incident where revelations of U.S. spying in the Soviet Union led to a lengthy publicized outburst from Nikita Khrushchev toward Dwight D. Eisenhower and ultimately led to the cancellation of a peace summit and worsened relations
- 2019 Trump–Ukraine scandal
- February 2025 United States–Russia Summit in Saudi Arabia – Meeting between the US and Russia on February 18, 2025
- 2025 Russia–United States Summit – Meeting between Donald Trump and Vladimir Putin in Alaska over Ukraine in August 2025
- 2025 Budapest Summit – Proposed meeting between Donald Trump and Vladimir Putin in Hungary
- ReArm Europe – European strategic defence initiative
- Peace negotiations in the Russo-Ukrainian war
- Foreign policy of the second Trump administration § Russia and Ukraine
- United States and the Russian invasion of Ukraine
