= Jakov Milatović =

President of Montenegro since 2023

- Јаков Милатовић
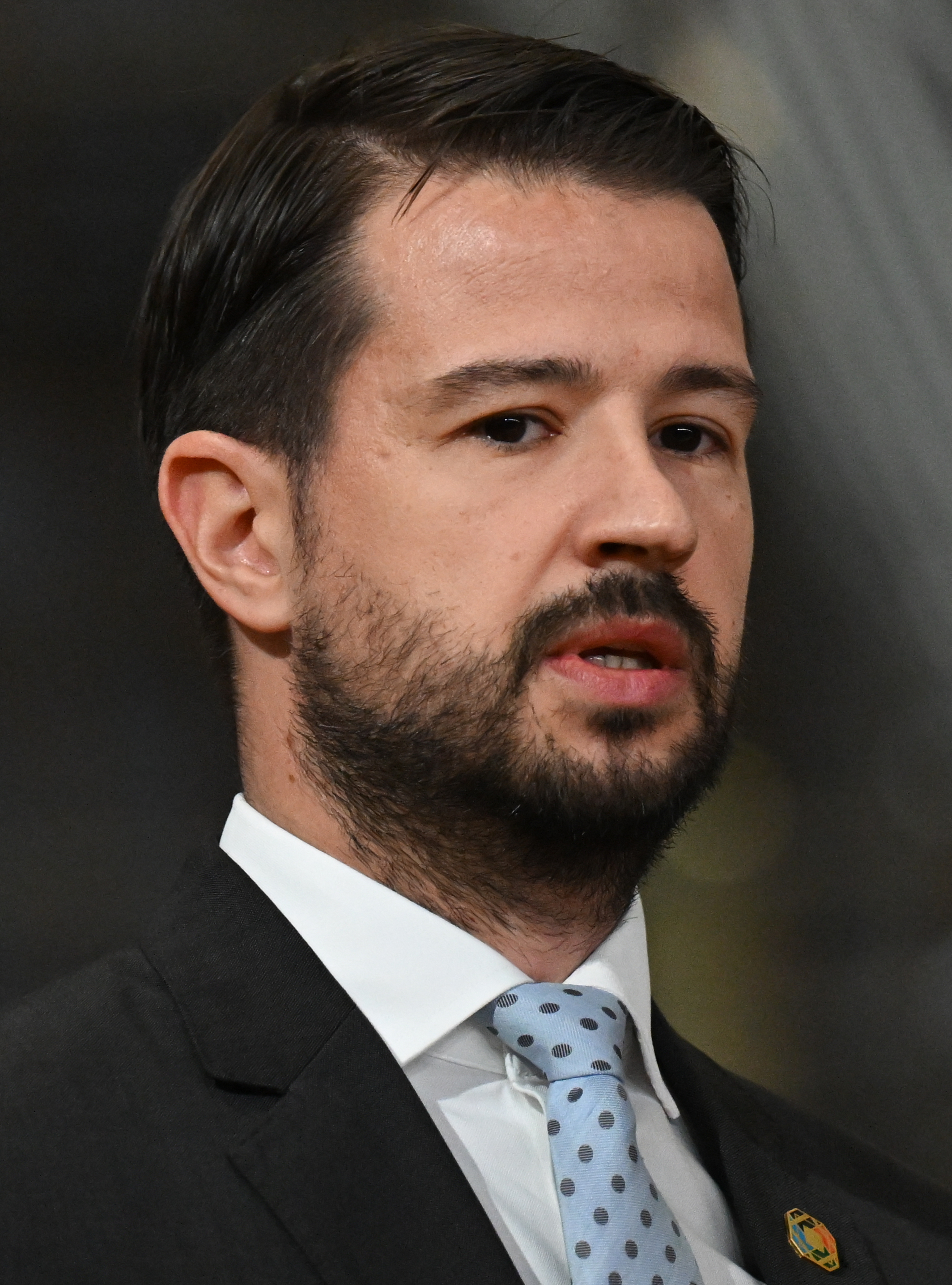
- Milatović in 2024

3rd President of Montenegro
- Incumbent
- Assumed office 20 May 2023
- Prime Minister: Dritan Abazović; Milojko Spajić
- Preceded by: Milo Đukanović

Minister of Economic Development
- In office 4 December 2020 – 28 April 2022
- Prime Minister: Zdravko Krivokapić
- Preceded by: Dragica Sekulić
- Succeeded by: Goran Đurović
Additional positions
Member of the City Assembly of Podgorica
In office
12 April 2023 – 11 May 2023

Personal details
- Born: 7 December 1986 (age 39) Titograd, SR Montenegro, Yugoslavia
- Party: Independent (before 2022, since 2024)
- Other political affiliations: Europe Now! (2022–2024)
- Spouse: Milena Milatović
- Children: 3
- Education: University of Montenegro (BA); St John's College, Oxford (MPhil)
- Occupation: Politician • Economist
- Website: https://predsjednik.me/en

Jakov Milatović (Cyrillic: Јаков Милатовић, pronounced [jakoʋ mǐlatoʋitɕ]; born 7 December 1986) is a Montenegrin politician and economist who is the incumbent president of Montenegro, serving since May 2023. He previously served as the minister of economic development in the cabinet of Zdravko Krivokapić from 2020 to 2022, and as an economist at the European Bank for Reconstruction and Development in London and Podgorica. He was a co-founder and until 24 February 2024 the deputy leader of Europe Now!, a liberal and pro-European political party that is the largest single party in the Montenegrin parliament.

Taking office in a landslide presidential election at the age of 36, Milatović is the youngest person to hold the office of president in independent Montenegro, as well as the world's sixth-youngest serving state leader. He is the third president of Montenegro since the country's independence in 2006. He has made improving living standards, tackling corruption, and the accession of Montenegro to the European Union by 2028 his central issues.

== Early life and education ==
Milatović was born on 7 December 1986 in Titograd, SR Montenegro, SFR Yugoslavia, where he graduated elementary and secondary school Gymnasium "Slobodan Škerović". In 2005, he wrote in his high school yearbook his ambition to become the president of Montenegro within ten years. His grandfather and great-grandfather fought in World War II as members of the Yugoslav Partisans. His great-grandfather had also participated in World War I and had fought in the Battle of Mojkovac in 1916. His father was a unionist and one of the founders of the Socialist People's Party (SNP). Milatović claimed his father couldn't find employment due to his opposition to the Democratic Party of Socialists (DPS).

He completed his undergraduate studies in the field of economics at the Faculty of Economics of the University of Montenegro. He then spent one academic year at Illinois State University as US Fellow; one semester at the Vienna University of Economics and Business (WU Wien) as Government of Austria Fellow; and one academic year at the Sapienza University of Rome (La Sapienza) as EU Fellow. Milatović completed his MPhil in economics at St John's College, Oxford. He was a British Government Chevening Scholarship Fellow. He was also a fellow of the German Konrad Adenauer Foundation. Besides his native Serbian, Milatović is fluent in English, and speaks Italian and Spanish.

== Economics career ==
Milatović worked at NLB Group Podgorica, and Deutsche Bank, Frankfurt. In 2014, he joined the European Bank for Reconstruction and Development in the team for economic and political analysis. In 2019, he was promoted to the principal economist for the EU countries, including Romania, Bulgaria, Croatia and Slovenia, and was based at the Bank's office in Bucharest. He has published a number of articles and co-authored two books.

== Political career ==
=== Minister of Economic Development (2020–2022) ===
He served as the minister of economic development in the Krivokapić Cabinet from 4 December 2020 to 28 April 2022. During his term, Milatović and finance minister Milojko Spajić presented and implemented the controversial "Europe now" economic reform program. The reform program aimed to increase the minimum wage, reduce taxes and social contributions, attract foreign investment, and accelerate Montenegro's integration into the European Union. The program was popular among the public and boosted the public approval of Milatović and Spajić.

=== Europe Now! and 2022 local elections ===
In 2022, Milatović and Spajić founded the Europe Now political party, with Spajić as president and Milatović as deputy president. It participated in the 2022 local elections, with Milatović heading the organizations electoral list in Podgorica as its mayoral candidate. The list won 21.7% of the popular vote and Milatović was expected to become the mayor of Podgorica.

=== 2023 presidential campaign ===
In March 2023, Milatović ran as a replacement candidate of Europe Now in the 2023 Montenegrin presidential election after Spajić's candidacy was rejected by the State Electoral Commission (DIK) as it was discovered that he is a dual citizen of Serbia and Montenegro. He was elected president following his landslide victory against the incumbent president Milo Đukanović in the run-off on 2 April 2023. Milatović won 58.88% of the popular vote. He stated that his first foreign visit will be to Brussels.

=== Presidency (2023–present) ===
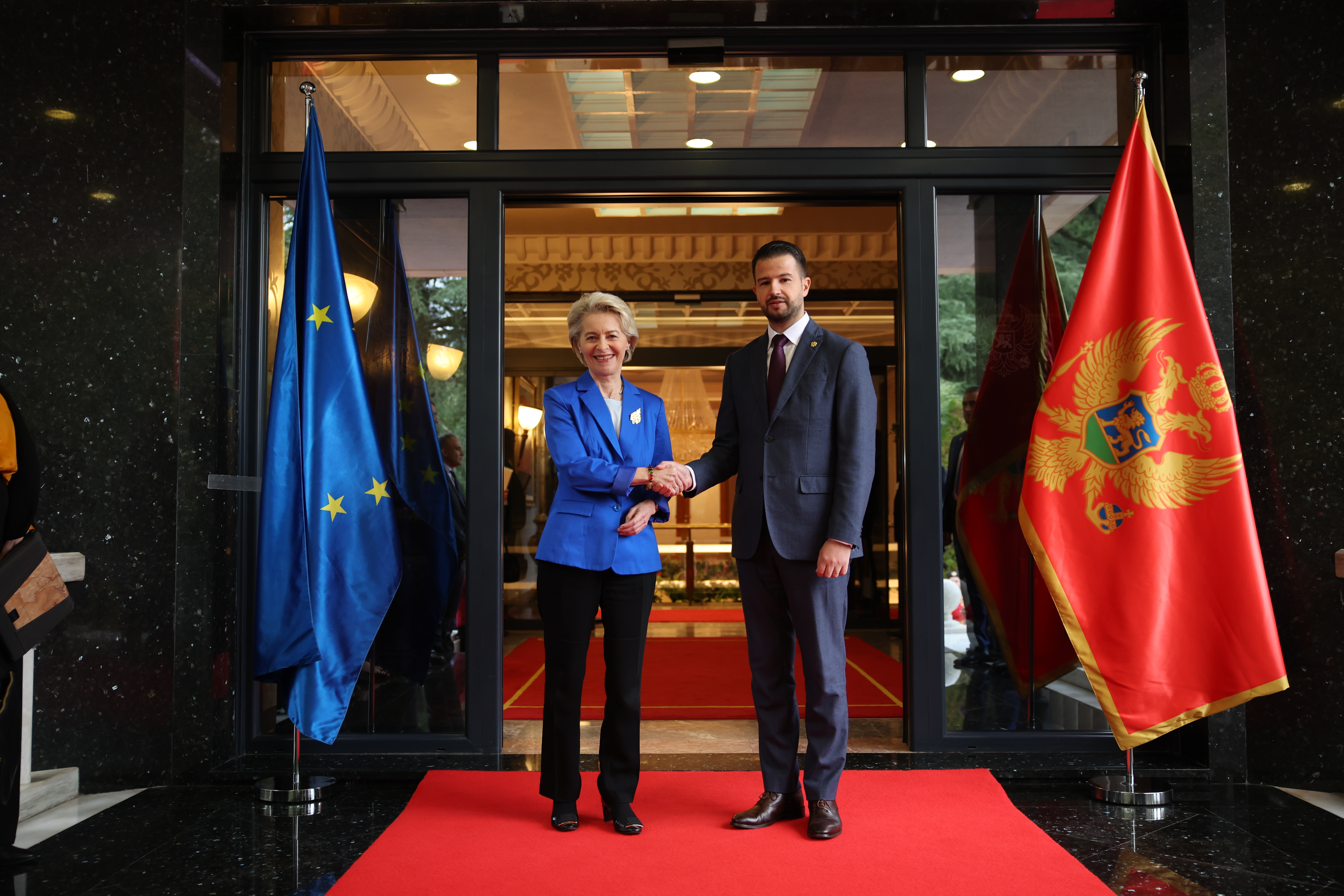
Milatović with President of the European Commission Ursula von der Leyen, 31 October 2023

Milatović was sworn in on 20 May 2023 in the Parliament of Montenegro in Podgorica instead of the traditional inauguration place of Cetinje. His inauguration was attended by numerous Balkan leaders such as Aleksandar Vučić, Zoran Milanović, Željko Komšić, Željka Cvijanović, Denis Bećirović, Vjosa Osmani, Bajram Begaj, and Galab Donev. Milatović was also congratulated by Pope Francis.

In June 2023, Milatović stated he expected Montenegro to join the European Union by 2027 or 2028. In August 2023, he met with Ukrainian president Volodymyr Zelenskyy in Athens, stating that Montenegro "openly and strongly condemns Russia's unprovoked aggression against Ukraine."

On 28 August 2023, Milatović said that the "winning energy" after his presidential election had been "shattered" by the disagreements over the new government formation, appealing to the prime minister-designate Spajič and everyone participating in the consultations on the formation of the new government to make the process "more transparent and in accordance with the electoral will".

On 24 February 2024, Milatović announced he would be leaving PES!, following a split with Spajić.

=== Political profile and resignation from PES (2024–present) ===
In February 2024, Jakov Milatović officially announced his resignation from all leadership positions and membership within the Europe Now Movement (PES), a centrist party he had co-founded in mid-2022 alongside Prime Minister Milojko Spajić. In his public statement, Milatović cited fundamental differences regarding party governance, transparency, internal democracy, and a perceived departure from the movement's original values and policy promises. Following his resignation, Milatović declared his intent to act as a fully non-partisan, independent President, positioned above party politics to ensure institutional balance, uphold constitutional norms, and serve as a unifying head of state for all citizens.

Operating as an independent president, Milatović frequently exercised his constitutional prerogative of the suspensive veto by returning legislation passed by the Parliament of Montenegro for reconsideration. His vetoes targeted key statutes concerning taxation, fiscal reform, public security, and local government management, where he expressed concerns regarding long-term macroeconomic stability, constitutional compliance, and alignment with European standards. Milatović consistently emphasized the need to depoliticize local public administrations and focus on community-level economic development.

== Political positions ==
His political positions have been described as centrist. Milatović voted for the independence of Montenegro at the 2006 independence referendum.

=== Foreign policy ===
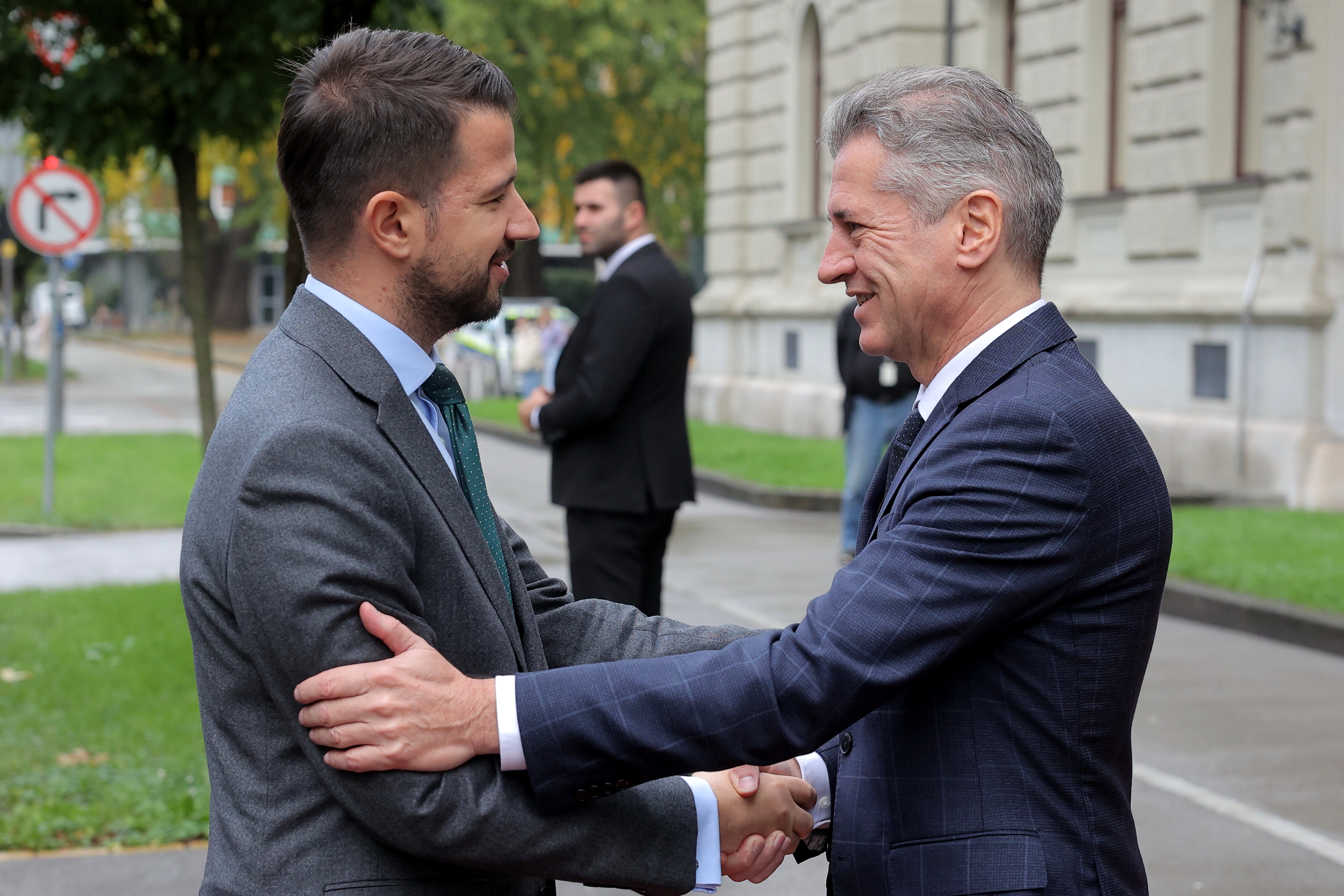
Milatović greeting Slovenian Prime Minister Robert Golob, 7 November 2023

Milatović with Mattarella during his official visit to Montenegro, February 18, 2025

Milatović supports the accession of Montenegro to the European Union. He advocates closer relations between Montenegro and Serbia. He supports sanctioning Russia due to its invasion of Ukraine, which he considers an act of aggression. Milatović called the proposals of Montenegro revoking the recognition of Kosovo's independence unrealistic, stating that Kosovo is an internationally recognized country. He stated that he agrees with the

Milatović and Macron during his official visit to Montenegro, June 4, 2026

International Court of Justice's verdict on the Srebrenica genocide, and has visited the Srebrenica Memorial Center in Potočari in 2025. He supports the Open Balkan initiative. On June 16, 2026, Montenegrin President Jakov Milatović addressed the European Parliament in Strasbourg, outlining the country's reform path toward European Union membership. His speech concluded to a standing ovation from members of the European Parliament, reflecting strong international support for Montenegro's European future.

Milatović addressing the European Parliament, 16 June 2026

==== EU Integration ====
Milatović made foreign affairs the cornerstone of his presidential mandate, actively promoting Montenegro's ambition to become the 28th member state of the European Union by 2028. His primary geopolitical goal has been accelerating Montenegro’s accession negotiations with the European Union, setting a target for the country to complete all institutional requirements and become the 28th EU member state by 2028.

To build international consensus for Montenegro's EU integration, Milatović conducted numerous bilateral official visits to major European capitals engaging in direct diplomacy with foreign heads of state, European Commission officials, and international diplomats. Throughout these meetings, he emphasized Montenegro’s status as a frontrunner among candidate countries and a strategic anchor of stability in the Western Balkans. Additionally, Milatović reaffirmed Montenegro’s steadfast commitment to its NATO obligations, supported defense spending benchmarks, and maintained 100% alignment with the European Union’s Common Foreign and Security Policy (CFSP). On the regional stage, he actively participated in the Brdo-Brijuni Process, the EU-Western Balkans Summits, and Regional Cooperation Council (RCC) initiatives, advocating for regional economic integration, cross-border infrastructure connectivity, and good-neighborly relations.

==== Relations with USA ====
A cornerstone of Milatović's foreign policy is the strengthening of strategic partnerships with the United States, marked by high-level diplomatic visits to Washington, D.C., and engagements celebrating long-standing historical alliances and shared Euro-Atlantic values. Furthermore, Milatović has regularly represented Montenegro at the United Nations General Assembly (UNGA) sessions in New York, utilizing the global multilateral platform to advocate for international stability, human rights, and the rule of law. His transatlantic engagements also extend to deepening economic and political cooperation with American federal and state officials, such as state governors and congressional leaders, with the aim of transforming traditional political alliances into concrete economic projects and bilateral investments.

A milestone in transatlantic relations occurred during his official address and attendance at the historic reception commemorating 120 years of diplomatic relations between Montenegro and the United States. Speaking at the ceremony, Milatović emphasized the deep historical alliance, trust, and shared values uniting the two nations since 1905, while reaffirming Montenegro's commitment to democratic principles and Euro-Atlantic security.

==== Diplomatic Outreach to Asia and Emerging Global Markets ====
In addition to traditional Western alliances, Milatović pursued an active policy of global diversification and diplomatic outreach toward dynamic economies in Asia and the Middle East. Through official state visits documented by his administration, he expanded Montenegro's international footprint by engaging with emerging global partners, such as Egypt, Kazakhstan and Mongolia. Milatović undertook an official visit to Cairo, establishing a new phase of bilateral cooperation with Egypt as a pivotal political and economic power in North Africa and the Arab world, focused on strengthening trade, tourism, and Mediterranean security frameworks. Expanding diplomatic horizons into Central and East Asia, Milatović held high-level state meetings with leadership figures in Kazakhstan and Mongolia, exploring cross-continental economic partnerships, green energy initiatives, and infrastructural cooperation.

=== EU – Western Balkans Summit in Tivat (2026) ===
One of the defining diplomatic achievements of Milatović's presidential mandate was bringing the EU – Western Balkans Summit to Montenegro., serving as its principal host and organizer through the Office of the President. Held on June 5, 2026, in the coastal municipality of Tivat, this marked the first event of such a supreme political magnitude in modern Montenegrin history.

The summit gathered 23 leaders of the European Union member states alongside 6 regional leaders and top European institutional officials. Milatović utilized this high-level gathering to reinforce regional economic convergence, policy integration, and the concrete momentum required to achieve Montenegro's strategic goal of becoming the 28th EU member state by 2028.

Family Photo EU-WB Summit, Tivat, June 5, 2026

== Educational initiatives, youth empowerment, and scholarships ==
A core focus of Milatović's domestic activities centered on youth empowerment, educational excellence, and creating structural incentives for young talents to thrive in Montenegro. Under the presidential motto "Hrabrost je učiti – Vrijednost je ostati" (Courage in Learning, Value in Staying), his administration institutionalized distinct support mechanisms tailored specifically for university students and high school pupils.

For higher education students, the Office of the President established prestigious state scholarships under presidential patronage aimed at high-achieving undergraduate and postgraduate students enrolled in globally top-ranked universities on the Academic Ranking of World Universities (Shanghai Ranking). Milatović forged public-private partnerships with major national companies to launch the "Iskra" Youth Fund, which provides multi-thousand-euro individual stipends to top university students across diverse academic disciplines to alleviate financial barriers.

Recognizing the importance of early talent development, Milatović's administration expanded support to high school students through targeted merit-based scholarship programs designed to empower young scholars across Montenegrin secondary schools.

Milatović with best high school students, July 6, 2026

Additionally, Milatović introduced an initiative to open the official Presidential Residence (Blue Palace) in Cetinje to primary school children across the country. Through organized educational visits, students gain direct insight into state protocols, national history, and the functioning of the presidential institution.

=== Youth Initiatives Council ===
To ensure that youth perspectives actively shape national policy, Milatović established the Youth Initiatives Council (Savjet za omladinske inicijative) as a permanent institutional body within the Office of the President. Comprising student representatives, young innovators, and youth-oriented civil society organizations, the Council serves as an advisory platform to directly review, draft, and propose policy measures on education, youth employment, and brain-drain prevention to the President and relevant state bodies.

== Civic dialogue ==
In order to increase institutional transparency and bridge the gap between rural/underdeveloped communities and central state institutions, Milatović introduced a regular series of open town-hall sessions under the title "Razgovori sa građanima" (Conversations with Citizens). Through this initiative, the President conducted systematic field visits to local municipalities throughout Montenegro—including northern communities such as Petnjica, Bijelo Polje, Pljevlja, Andrijevica, Mojkovac as well as Danilovgrad. Held in local cultural centers and public venues, these unscripted sessions allowed local residents, farmers, small business owners, and community leaders to directly present their socio-economic concerns, infrastructural deficiencies, and administrative grievances to the President. The information, petitions, and feedback gathered during these meetings were systematically compiled by the Office of the President into official policy recommendations and formally dispatched to the relevant ministries and the Government of Montenegro for resolution.

== Promotion of culture, arts, and sports ==
Milatović actively used the presidency to support Montenegro’s cultural heritage and promote athletic performance on the international stage.

=== Cultural Patronage ===
The President served as an official patron for primary state cultural festivals and artistic events. He routinely held formal receptions at the Presidential Residence in Cetinje for prominent artists, writers, researchers, and winners of the Thirteenth of July Award, framing cultural preservation and artistic innovation as essential components of Montenegro’s national identity and European trajectory.

Milatović receiving a gift from the Montenegrin Olympic Committee, May 25, 2026

=== Sports Promotion ===
Milatović instituted a practice of hosting state receptions to honor national athletic teams, Olympians, Paralympians, and individual athletes following performance in international competitions (such as national water polo, handball, and basketball teams). Additionally, he publicly advocated for public-private funding initiatives to build modernized sports infrastructure and recreational facilities in economically disadvantaged northern municipalities.

=== Minority issues ===
Milatović has voiced support for minorities in Montenegro. He reached out to minority communities within the country to start a dialogue, with the intent of creating an environment of equal opportunities. He has also voiced support for the Roma minority in Montenegro, expressing hope that they may be represented in Parliament of Montenegro.

Milatović has consistently voiced support for minorities in Montenegro, actively engaging with minority communities across the country to establish open dialogue and foster an inclusive society based on equal opportunities. Expanding beyond general political declarations, his administration institutionalized direct outreach to national minorities—including Bosniak, Albanian, Croat, and Roma communities—by holding official meetings with minority national councils and civil society representatives to address issues of political representation, economic integration, and cultural preservation.

=== LGBTQ issues ===
In June 2023, Milatović met with LGBTQ groups such as Queer Montenegro. This came only a month after such groups had refused to meet with the Minister for Human and Minority Rights, Fatmir Gjeka, in response to his failure to make progress on LGBTQ initiatives. In the wake of the meeting, he stressed that Montenegro is a country of equal rights for every citizen and that there shouldn’t be any kind of discrimination. He pointed out that Montenegro has often been an unsafe country for the LGBTQ population, but vowed to do what he could to protect vulnerable groups.

=== Immigration ===
Milatović has voiced support for immigrants in Montenegro, such as pointing out that "the international community often replaces preventive responses with reactionary measures— the migration crisis in the Mediterranean region is just one example." He also highlighted examples of Montenegro supporting immigrants in the past, such as when Podgorica gave shelter to 100,000 refugees and displaced persons during Yugoslav Wars. Furthermore, he drew attention to Montenegro's support of immigrants from Ukraine.

While maintaining this humanitarian perspective, Milatović’s migration agenda shifted toward two strategic priorities: curbing the domestic brain drain and aligning national policy with European Union border security standards. Framing youth emigration as a primary demographic challenge, Milatović introduced proposals for "return migration" programs aimed at incentivizing young Montenegrin professionals abroad to return and contribute to national development. Additionally, he has consistently advocated for strengthened border control management, robust measures against human trafficking, and full alignment with the EU Migration and Asylum Pact in close coordination with European partners and Frontex.

== Environmental policy ==
Milatović has consistently advocated for reinforcing Montenegro’s constitutional vision as an "Ecological State," positioning environmental preservation and green transition as indispensable pillars of both national development and Montenegro's European Union integration process under Chapter 27 (Environment and Climate Change).

Marking the 35th anniversary of the historic 1991 Declaration declaring Montenegro the world's first ecological state, Milatović's administration formally launched the comprehensive strategic policy initiative titled "Ecological State 2.0" (Ekološka država 2.0) in September 2026. Stemming from presidential roundtables with civil society organizations, environmental activists, and academic experts, the initiative outlines 20 concrete policy measures aimed at transforming Montenegro's constitutional declaration into practical legislation, measurable conservation targets, and sustainable development projects.

Key pillars of the "Ecological State 2.0" vision include declaring Žabljak as the ecological capital of Montenegro, granting citizens free entry to national parks to foster environmental awareness, establishing a national biodiversity monitoring system, enforcing strict coastline protections against overbuilding, and developing green hydrogen energy frameworks alongside a circular economy return system for packaging waste. Furthermore, Milatović continues to advocate for strict legislative controls against illegal deforestation, industrial pollution, and habitat destruction, emphasizing that Montenegro’s natural heritage remains its primary global brand and European obligation.

== Personal life ==
Milatović is married to Milena Milatović. They have three children together. He is a Serbian Orthodox Christian and was baptized in the Ostrog Monastery, however he considers his religious views a private matter. He identifies himself as a Montenegrin by ethnicity, and speaks Serbian.

== Honours ==
=== Foreign honours ===
- Italy: Knight Grand Cross with Collar of the Order of Merit of the Italian Republic (18 February 2025)
- Sovereign Military Order of Malta: Collar of the Order pro Merito Melitensi (17 March 2026)
- France: Grand Cross of the National Order of the Legion of Honour (4 June 2026)

== See also ==
- List of state leaders by age#Youngest serving state leaders

Political offices
Preceded by Dragica Sekulić	Minister of Economic Development; 2020–2022	Succeeded by Goran Đurović
Preceded by Milo Đukanović	President of Montenegro; 2023–present	Incumbent
