= Asocijacija Spektra =

Montenegrin association

Association Spectra
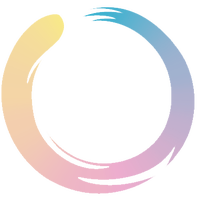
- The Association Spectra logo
- Formation: 2017
- Type: Non-governmental organization
- Legal status: NGO
- Purpose: LGBT social movements, Transgender rights movement, Civil and political rights, Feminism
- Headquarters: Podgorica
- Region served: Montenegro
- CEO: Jovan Joli Ulicevic
- Project coordinator: Danijela Nikic
- Affiliations: Queer Montenegro
- Website: www.asocijacijaspektra.org

Association Spectra (Montenegrin: Asocijacija Spektra) is a grassroots organization based in Podgorica that works on promotion and protection of human rights of transgender, gender diverse and intersex persons in Montenegro. It was founded in 2017 as a spin-off from the organization Queer Montenegro. The organization works in the field of community support, advocacy, education, media and culture.

Asocijacija Spektra is a member of multiple networks including Transgender Europe, the Equal Rights Association for Western Balkans and Turkey and the International Lesbian, Gay, Bisexual, Transgender and Queer Youth and Student Organisation.

== History ==
Association Spectra was founded in 2017. It began life as a spinoff of the organization Queer Montenegro. The founders of Association Spectra were member of an informal group within Queer Montenegro called "Transovci".

In 2019, Association Spectra signed multiple agreements with international organizations like the United Nations High Commissioner for Refugees, Eurasian Key Populations Health Network, Stonewall and public institutions especially in the field of healthcare.

In May 2023, Asocijacija Spektra, along with Queer Montenegro and other LGBTIQ+ groups in Montenegro, refused to meet with the Minister for Human and Minority Rights, Fatmir Gjeka, in response to his failure to make progress on LGBTQ initiatives. The next month, in June 2023, Queer Montenegro and these other groups met with president Jakov Milatović, after which Milatović stressed the need for the government to support LGBTIQ+ people.

== Goals ==
Association Spectra aims to protect and advance the rights of transgender, gender diverse, and intersex people in Montenegro. Their beliefs include such topics as bodily autonomy, diversity, equity, and inclusion, and feminism. Outside of the field of trans issues, they are also outspoken about decolonization and pacifism.

Their vision is a society in which all persons enjoy equal rights, in which all identities and bodies are respected and differences are celebrated.
