= Queer Montenegro =

LGBTIQ non-profit organization from Montenegro

Montenegrin LGBTIQ Association Queer Montenegro
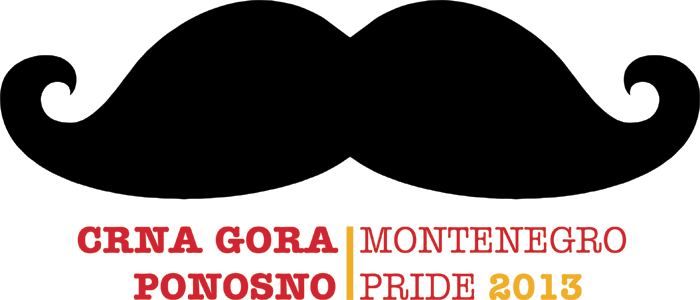
- Montenegro Pride 2013 logo
- Formation: 2012
- Type: Non-governmental organization
- Legal status: NGO
- Purpose: LGBT social movements, Civil and political rights
- Headquarters: Podgorica
- Region served: Montenegro
- Director: Danijel Kalezić
- Affiliations: Asocijacija Spektra
- Website: queermontenegro.org

The Montenegrin LGBTIQ Association Queer Montenegro is a non-governmental organization established in October 2012, and registered in March 2013 in Podgorica. Queer Montenegro consists of longtime activists for human rights, and professionals from various fields of social life and different specialties.

== History ==
Queer Montenegro emerged from informal LGBTIQ+ group Queer Brigade, noted for its striking performances in the field of human rights in Montenegro. The organization was formed out of a desire to find new ways to protect the human rights of LGBTIQ+ people. In particular, they seek to identify and solve issues that LGBTIQ+ people, as well as their friends and family, face.

In May 2023, Queer Montenegro, along with Asocijacija Spektra and other LGBTIQ+ groups in Montenegro, refused to meet with the Minister for Human and Minority Rights, Fatmir Gjeka, in response to his failure to make progress on LGBTQ initiatives. The next month, in June 2023, Queer Montenegro and these other groups met with president Jakov Milatović, after which Milatović stressed the need for the government to support LGBTIQ+ people.

=== Montenegro Pride ===
On October 20, 2013, Queer Montenegro organized the first Montenegrin pride parade, held in Podgorica. Following that, they have continued to hold parades in Podgorica annually, with their 10th pride parade being run in September, 2023.

=== Asocijacija Spektra ===
In 2017, the organization Asocijacija Spektra was founded by members of the informal "Transovci" group within Queer Montenegro, focusing on the intersection between queer rights and feminism.

== Goals ==
The aim of the organization involves the construction of a wide Montenegro's LGBTIQ+ movement which will be actively and continuously in the fight for the protection of human rights, combating homophobia and transphobia, achieving full legal and social equality and the full acceptance of LGBT people by general population. One of the goals is the visibility and participation of LGBTIQ+ people in decision-making and policy-making process related to human rights, continuous festivals of queer arts and culture and other events, and the improvement of health services.

The organization seeks to achieve its goals of furthering LGBTIQ+ protections and visibility through a variety of programs. They seek to use lobbying, both domestically and internationally, to advance LBGTIQ+ rights within the country. They also hold pride parades and organize festivals for queer arts and culture in order to increase the profile of LGBTIQ+ people. Finally, they aim to promote LGBTIQ+ ideas to the public, both to help LGBTIQ+ people self-organize and to normalize LGBTIQ+ people within the culture.
