= Ministry of Economy (Montenegro) =

Government ministry of Montenegro

- Ministarstvo ekonomije

Agency overview
- Formed: 2006
- Jurisdiction: Government of Montenegro
- Headquarters: Podgorica
- Agency executive: Aleksandar Damjanović, Minister of Economy of Montenegro
- Website: mek.gov.me

Minister of Economy (Montenegrin: Ministar ekonomije / Министар економије) is the person in charge of the Ministry of Economy of Montenegro (Ministarstvo ekonomije). Aleksandar Damjanović is the current Minister of Economy, since 4 December 2020.

== Ministers of Economy, since 2006 ==
Democratic Party of Socialists Democratic People's Party Social Democratic Party Independent

Minister	Start of term	End of term
Predrag Bošković	21 May 2006	10 November 2006
Vujica Lazović^{[a]}	10 November 2006	29 December 2010
Vladimir Kavarić	29 December 2010	28 November 2016
Dragica Sekulić	28 November 2016	4 December 2020
Jakov Milatović	4 December 2020	28 April 2022
Aleksandar Damjanović	28 April 2022	Incumbent

^{a} Deputy Prime Minister for Economic and Financial Policy
