= Goran Đurović =

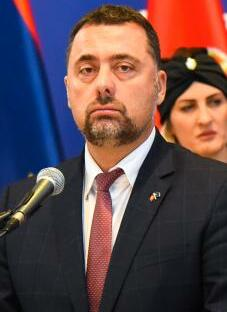
Đurović during a visit to Vojvodina in 2022

Goran Đurović (Montenegrin Cyrillic: Горан Ђуровић; born 5 June 1972) is a Montenegrin politician and businessman serving as the minister of economic development and tourism in the government of Dritan Abazović since 28 April 2022. He is a vice president of the United Reform Action (URA).

Đurović is the executive director of the "Cerovo" company and is known for his humanitarian and philanthropic activities.
