= Corruption in Montenegro =

Corruption in Montenegro describes the prevention and occurrence of corruption in Montenegro. In recent years, Montenegro has increased its efforts to implement preventive and legislative measures needed to curb corruption. For example, anti-bribery provisions in the Criminal Code, as well as laws on money laundering, conflict of interest, access to information, and political funding have all been strengthened. At the same time, awareness-raising activities and training of public officials in integrity standards have been intensified.

However, corruption remains a serious problem in the country. The European Commission finds in its Progress Report 2013 that efficiency in the fight against corruption is constrained by frequent legislative changes and the lax attitude among law enforcement authorities to investigate corruption allegations, especially those involving high-level officials.

== Areas ==
=== Business ===
Active and passive bribery is prohibited by the Montenegrin Criminal Code, and government officials are subject to more stringent requirements under the Law on the Prevention of Conflict of Interest, which stipulates that they may only receive appropriate gifts of small value (not exceeding the amount of EUR 50).

=== Government ===
On Transparency International's 2025 Corruption Perceptions Index, Montenegro scored 46 on a scale from 0 ("highly corrupt") to 100 ("very clean"). When ranked by score, Montenegro ranked 65th among the 182 countries in the Index, where the country ranked first is perceived to have the most honest public sector. For comparison with regional scores, the best score among Western European and European Union countries (Note: Austria, Belgium, Bulgaria, Croatia, Cyprus, Czechia, Denmark, Estonia, Finland, France, Germany, Greece, Hungary, Iceland, Ireland, Italy, Latvia, Lithuania, Luxembourg, Malta, Netherlands, Norway, Poland, Portugal, Romania, Slovakia, Slovenia, Spain, Sweden, Switzerland, and the United Kingdom.) was 89, the average score was 64 and the worst score was 40. For comparison with worldwide scores, the best score was 89 (ranked 1), the average score was 42, and the worst score was 9 (ranked 181, in a two-way tie).

== See also ==
- Crime in Montenegro
