= Oleksandr Merezhko =

Ukrainian lawyer and jurist

- Олександр Мережко
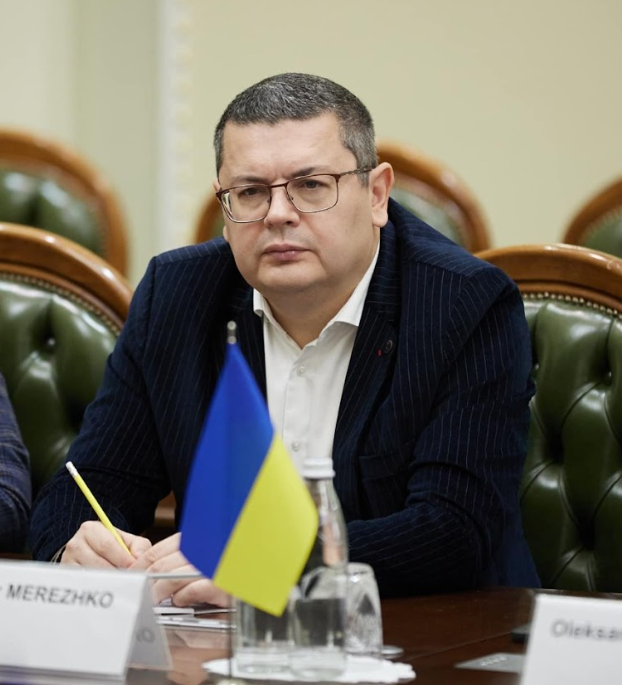

Personal details
- Born: 14 February 1971 (age 55) Bobrynets, Kirovohrad Oblast, Ukrainian SSR, Soviet Union
- Party: Servant of the People
- Education: Taras Shevchenko National University of Kyiv, University of Denver
- Occupation: Lawyer, philosopher, politician

Oleksandr Oleksandrovich Merezhko (Ukrainian: Олександр Олександрович Мережко; born 14 February 1971) is a Ukrainian politician, jurist and academic. He has been a deputy of the Verkhovna Rada of Ukraine for the Servant of the People party since the 2019 election and currently serves as chair of the committee on foreign policy and interparliamentary relations. From 2020 to 2024 he was one of Ukraine's 12 deputies in the Parliamentary Assembly of the Council of Europe, serving as vice president from 2020 to 2022.

== Early life and education ==
Oleksandr Merezhko was born on 14 February 1971 in Bobrynets, Kirovohrad Oblast. He graduated from Taras Shevchenko National University of Kyiv with honors (specialty – international law). In 1992–1993 he studied at Denver University in 1994.

Merezhko completed postgraduate studies at Taras Shevchenko National University of Kyiv, defending a Candidate's Thesis on the topic of "Humanitarian Intervention and International Law" in 1996 and a Doctoral Dissertation titled “Theory and Principles of Transnational Trade Law (Lex Mercatoria)” in 2002.

== Career ==
Merezhko was a lecturer and professor at multiple academic institutions including the University of Denver, the Diplomatic Academy of Ukraine, the Taras Shevchenko National University, at Penn State Dickinson Law, the University KROK in Kyiv, the John Paul II Catholic University of Lublin, the National Transport University, the Andrzej Frych Modzweski Academy, the university of the State Fiscal Service of Ukraine and the O. P. Jindal Global University.

From 2011-2019, Merezhko was the head of the Chair of Law for the Kyiv National Linguistic University.

== Academic views ==
=== Study of Russian politics ===
Researches the political and legal system and history of the Russian Federation from the point of view of the sociology of law. Based on the publications of Mykola Timashev, he writes that under the facade of "managed democracy" hides a regime of despotic power in a softened form, characteristic of the history of the Russian state. In the article "Russia as a fascist society" he proves that today Russia corresponds to the scientific and sociological criteria of a fascist society.

=== History of international law ===
In the book "Russian Science of International Law during the First World War" (Kyiv, 2014) he analyzed international law during the war and criticized the modern Russian doctrine of international law, which after the beginning of the temporary annexation of Crimea by the Russian Federation turned into propaganda of the Putin regime.

=== Views on Russia's aggression against other countries ===
He is the author of numerous articles on the topic of Russian aggression against Ukraine, researches it from the point of view of international law. Justifies the right of the Crimean Tatar people to self-determination as an indigenous people within Ukraine. Conducts a critical analysis of the arguments of Russian international lawyers and shows the criminal nature of the annexation of Crimea by Russia. In 2008, in one of his journalistic articles, he interpreted the Russo-Georgian war as Georgian aggression by Saakashvili's "imperial" regime against South Ossetia, which met the main criteria of statehood, and the Ossetian people themselves had the right, in Merezhko's opinion, to secession. In the same article, he expressed the opinion that Ukraine should recognize the legitimacy of the secession of both Kosovo and South Ossetia and Abkhazia by analogy with the international recognition of Kosovo by most EU countries, as well as the US, Canada and Australia. In 2020, in a conversation with RadioFreeEurope/RadioLiberty, Merezhko stated that Russia, invading the territory of Georgia in 2008 under the guise of peacekeeping, actually carried out an armed aggression against Georgia with the occupation of part of its sovereign territory.

=== Study of Russia's status in the UN ===
Justified the thesis that Russia, taking the place of the USSR in the UN Security Council, thereby clearly violated the UN Charter, since it cannot be considered the same state and the same subject of international law as the USSR; and therefore, from the point of view of international law, Russia cannot be considered a member of the UN.

=== Participation in international scientific conferences on the Crimea annexation ===
In June 2014, he gave a speech "Ideology of Liberalism and International Law" at a scientific conference at the university of Tartu (Estonia), in which he criticized Russia's annexation of Crimea from the point of view of international law.

In September 2014, he gave a speech "The Collapse of the USSR and Territorial Consequences" at the Institute named after Plank in Heidelberg (Germany), in which he showed the illegality of Russia's annexation of Crimea.

In December 2014, he spoke at the university of Helsinki (Finland) at the "Ukrainian Crisis" seminar with a report in which he presented international legal arguments against Russia's invasion of Donbas.

In March 2015, in Warsaw, at the conference "The Case of Crimea in the Light of International Law", he raised the question of the forms and mechanisms of Russia's international legal responsibility for aggression against Ukraine.

== Political career ==
- Chair of the Committee on Foreign Policy and interparliamentary relations of the Verkhovna Rada of Ukraine.
- Vice-president of PACE from 27 January 2020 to 23 January 2022. Member of the Permanent Delegation to the Parliamentary Assembly of the Council of Europe.
- Deputy head of the delegation to participate in the Trilateral Contact Group.
- Co-chair of the Inter-Parliamentary Alliance on China.
- Member of the team of president Volodymyr Zelenskyy.
- Member of the Ukrainian Society of International Law and the American Association of International Law.
- Head of the Ukrainian part of the Interparliamentary Assembly of the Verkhovna Rada of Ukraine and the Seimas of the Republic of Lithuania.
- Deputy co-chair of the Interparliamentary Assembly of the Verkhovna Rada of Ukraine, the Parliament of Georgia, the Parliament of the Republic of Moldova.
- Deputy co-chair of the Interparliamentary Assembly of the Verkhovna Rada of Ukraine, the Seimas of the Republic of Lithuania and the Sejm and Senate of the Republic of Poland.
- Deputy co-chair of the Ukraine-NATO Inter-Parliamentary Council (UNIC).
- Deputy co-chair of the executive committee of the National Parliamentary Group in the Inter-Parliamentary Union.

He was a successful candidate for People's Deputies from the Servant of the People party in the 2019 parliamentary elections, No. 85 on the list.

Member of the VRU Committee on Legal Policy, since 17 January 2020 – Chairman of the VRU Committee on Foreign Policy, replacing Bohdan Yaremenko in this position.

=== Political views ===
Advocates women's rights against violence. He created and headed in the Verkhovna Rada the Inter-factional association "For the ratification of the Istanbul Convention!", which conducted an active campaign to support the ratification of this convention.

In the late 1990s, he was influenced by the critical theory of the Frankfurt School, in particular, such social philosophers as Erich Fromm; however, later, under the influence of Petrazhytskyi's philosophy, he switched to the position of liberal democracy. He is a consistent supporter of complete freedom of speech and thought.

Ukraine found itself in a new version of the Russian Empire – the USSR, where it became a victim of what some consider genocide – the Holodomor. Rafal Lemkin, the author of the term "genocide", called the Holodomor an example of Soviet genocide: "This is not just a mass murder. This is genocide, the destruction of culture and people. Soviet national unity is created not through the unity of ideas and cultures, but through the complete destruction of all cultures and all ideas except one – the Soviet one." Russian military aggression against Ukraine is nothing more than a continuation of the traditional Russian imperialist policy aimed at destroying the independent Ukrainian state and enslaving the Ukrainian people.

In an interview with RadioFreeEurope/RadioLiberty, he called the US a partner and friend of Ukraine.

In 2020, he spoke before the Petition Committee of the German Bundestag, presenting arguments in favor of recognizing the Holodomor as genocide of the Ukrainian people.

He is one of the authors and initiators of the appeal of the Verkhovna Rada of Ukraine to the Bundestag regarding recognition of the Holodomor as genocide of the Ukrainian people.

He held hundreds of meetings with colleagues from the foreign affairs committees of the world parliaments, during which he emphasized the need to recognize the Holodomor as a genocide of the Ukrainian people, and also called on his colleagues to unite for Ukraine's victory over the Russian Federation and bring it to justice for all crimes committed.

He became one of the initiators of the recognition of Russia's crimes as genocide of the Ukrainian people, as well as the adoption by the Verkhovna Rada of Ukraine of an appeal to the parliaments and countries of the world regarding the recognition of Russia's crimes as genocide of the Ukrainian people.

== Awards and titles ==
The honorary title of Honored Lawyer of Ukraine (23 August 2021) – for a significant personal contribution to state building, strengthening defense capabilities, socio-economic, scientific-technical, cultural and educational development of the Ukrainian state, significant labor achievements, many years of conscientious work and on the occasion of the 30 anniversary of the independence of Ukraine.

== Sources ==
- Site of the Encyclopedia of Modern Ukraine.
