= Ravi Agrawal =

Indian journalist and television producer

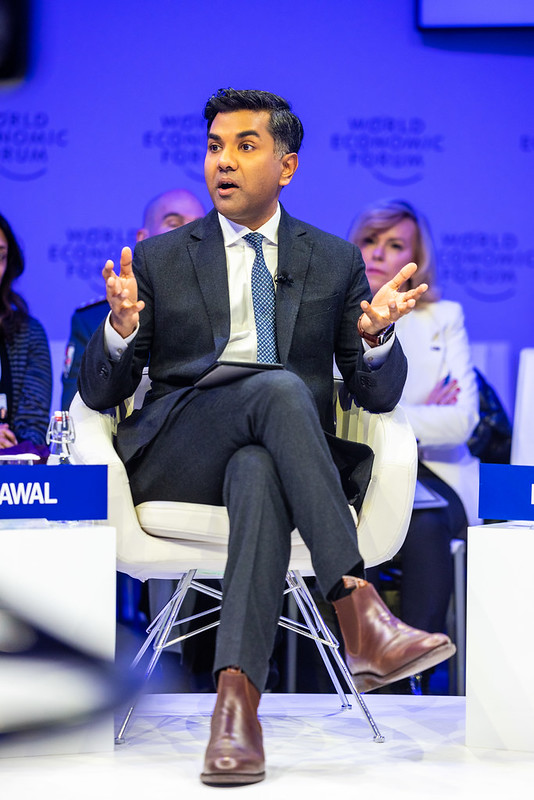
- Ravi Agrawal moderating a discussion at the World Economic Forum in Davos, Switzerland on January 16, 2024
- Born: 16 October 1982 (age 43); London, UK
- Education: Harvard University (AB)
- Occupation: Journalist
- Employer: Foreign Policy
- Spouse: Emma Vaughn (m. 2013)

Ravi Agrawal (born 16 October 1982) is a journalist and global affairs commentator. He is the editor in chief of Foreign Policy magazine and the host of FP Live, a podcast and video show. Previously, Agrawal worked for the U.S. news channel CNN for 11 years, spanning full-time roles on three continents. He is the author of India Connected.

== Early life and education ==
Agrawal was born in London, England and raised in Calcutta, India. After finishing high school in India, he attended college at Harvard University where he worked for The Harvard Crimson.

== Career ==
=== Foreign Policy ===
Agrawal began working at Foreign Policy magazine in April 2018 as its managing editor. He was named Editor in Chief in November 2020. In 2022, Agrawal launched FP Live, a video show and podcast in which he interviews world leaders, policymakers, and experts. He is a regular moderator at conferences such as the World Economic Forum in Davos, the Munich Security Conference, and Doha Forum. During Agrawal's tenure as editor, the magazine launched weekly newsletters focused on Africa, China, Latin America, South Asia, and Southeast Asia.

Agrawal's essay "India Has a Mindset Problem" was part of a selection of FP articles nominated for the 2020 National Magazine Award for columns and commentary.

He is a frequent commentator on world affairs on CNN, MSNBC, the BBC, and on NPR.

=== CNN ===
Agrawal began his career in TV journalism at CNN International in 2006, where he worked across the network's news and business programs. In 2009, he helped launch the London prime time program Connect the World and served as its senior producer.

From 2011 to 2014, Agrawal lived and worked in New York City. He was the senior producer of CNN's Sunday world affairs program Fareed Zakaria GPS. Agrawal was part of the program's 2012 Peabody Award-winning team, as well as its three Emmy nominated programs across 2012 and 2013.

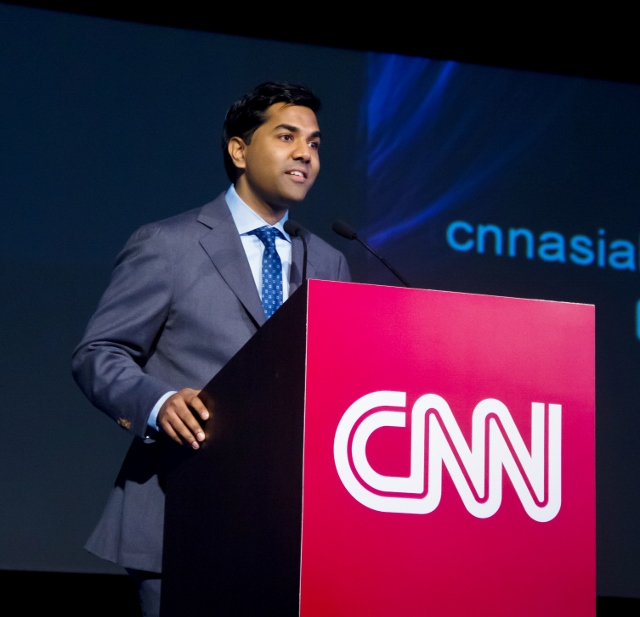
Ravi Agrawal presenting the CNN Asia Business Forum in Mumbai in 2016

From 2014 to 2017, Agrawal served as the network's New Delhi bureau chief, managing CNN's multi-platform news gathering in South Asia.

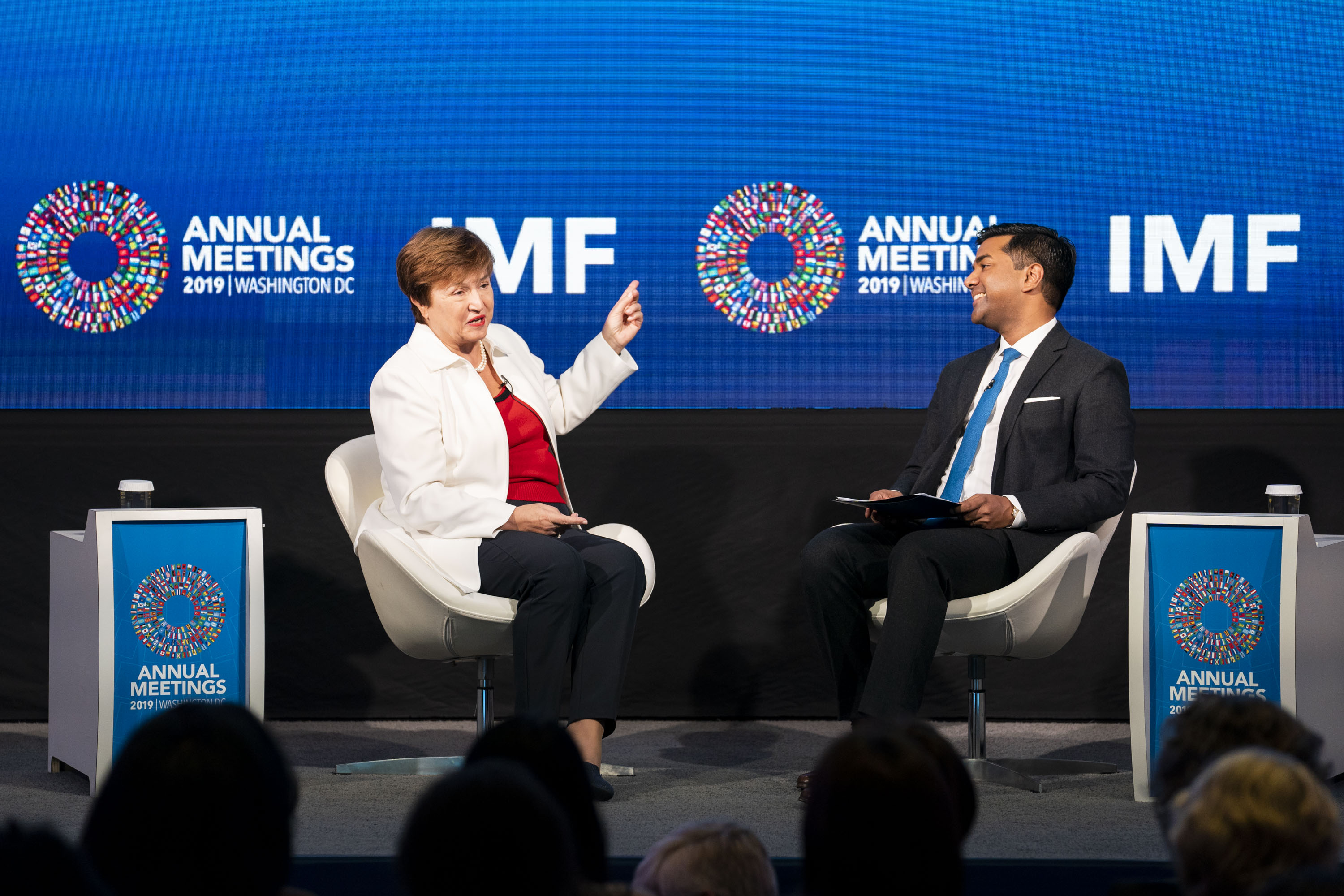
Ravi Agrawal interviewing IMF managing director Kristalina Georgieva at the IMF's annual meeting on 15 October 2019

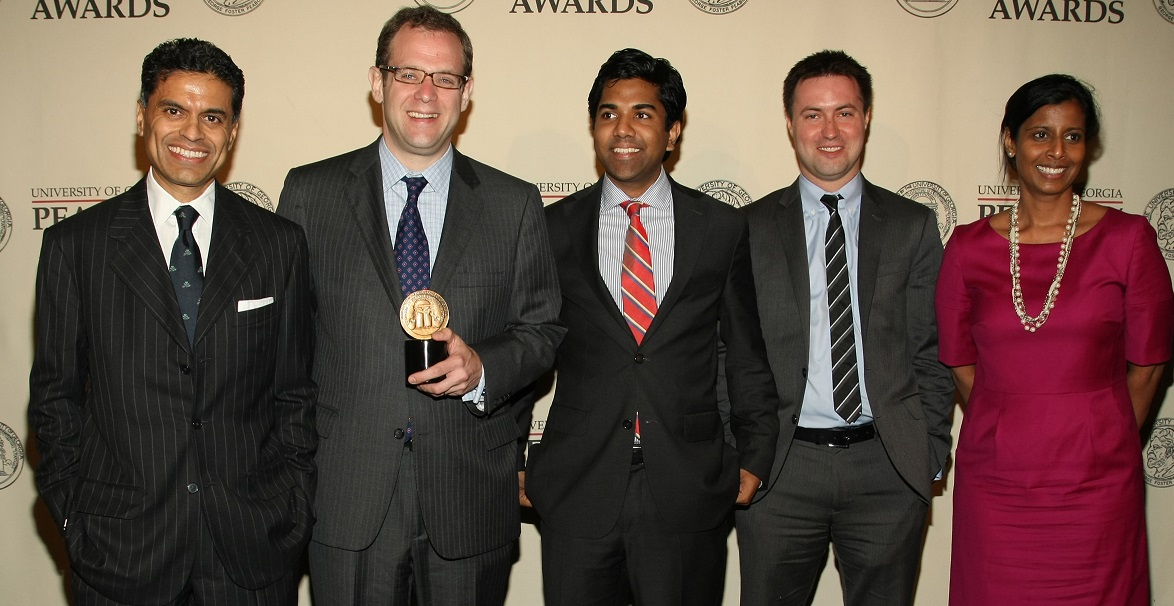
Ravi Agrawal at the Peabody Awards in 2012 in New York City

Agrawal reported regularly on-air for CNN International and CNN.com. He covered a breadth of stories from the region, including economics, foreign policy, and breaking news stories. Agrawal reported for CNN International's award-winning Freedom Project series, including a report on child slaves in rural Uttar Pradesh.

== Book ==
Agrawal's India Connected: How the Smartphone is Transforming the World's Biggest Democracy released in September 2018 in India, November 2018 in the United States, and January 2019 in the United Kingdom.

Writing for the Wall Street Journal, novelist Megha Majumdar picked India Connected as among the "five best" books on India today. A review in the UK's Financial Times described the book as "timely and absorbing" and "hard to put down", while the New Statesman's reviewer Oliver Balch called it "smart, sympathetic, and highly readable." India Today said "most books on India's tech and telecom boom quickly get dated. The stories in India Connected are timeless and will age well into nice snapshots of history."

== Personal ==
He married Emma Vaughn in 2013. They live in New York City.

Agrawal was named an Asia21 Young Leader by the Asia Society in 2016. Until 2016, Agrawal was a Young Global Shaper with the World Economic Forum, and has served a two-year term on the group's Global Agenda Council on India, and a four-year term on its Global Futures Council on Geopolitics.
