= Dragica Sekulić =

Montenegrin politician

Dragica Sekulić (Montenegrin Cyrillic: Драгица Секулић; born 1980) is a Montenegrin politician, and a former Minister of Economy of the Duško Marković cabinet from 28 November 2016 to 4 December 2020.

== Life ==
Born in Titograd, Sekulić is a member of the Democratic Party of Socialists. She graduated from the University of Montenegro Faculty of Electrical Engineering.

== Political career ==
Sekulić was the coordinator of projects in the energy field, Advisor in the Ministry of Economy, as well as Deputy Minister of Economy. From November 2016 to December 2020 she was the Minister of Economy in Duško Marković' cabinet in the 41st Government of Montenegro. During her term as Minister of Economy, she launched a 'Buy Domestic' campaign to make it easier for Montenegrin companies to sell their products in the domestic market. Sekulic negotiated with the Minister of Agriculture in Croatia over increased fees for importing fruit and vegetables into Croatia. She also signed a deal with Albania, Bosnia, Croatia and Azerbaijan’s state oil company SOCAR to implement the Ionian Adriatic Pipeline (IAP) project, for the delivery of natural gas. Sekulic also discussed the construction of submarine cable to Italy and the construction of a 400KV electricity transmission line between Montenegro, Serbia and Bosnia and Herzegovina.

Other government roles held by Sekulić include being a member of the Coordination Committee for the preparation of the Energy Development Strategy, being part of an expert team for the preparation of the Strategy of Sustainable Development of Montenegro, and participating in the preparation of the Study on Renewable Energy Sources in Montenegro. In 2013 Sekulić was appointed as the Head of the Negotiating team for Chapter 15 – Energy, a negotiation with the European Union.
