= List of Kappa Kappa Gamma members =

Following is a list of Kappa Kappa Gamma members (commonly referred to as Kappas). It includes initiated and honorary members of Kappa Kappa Gamma.

== Academia and education ==
Name	Chapter	Notability	References
Sarah Gibson Blanding	Beta Chi	President of Vassar College (1946–1964)	
Kathy Cox	Epsilon Epsilon	Georgia superintendent of public schools	
Virginia Gildersleeve	Beta Epsilon	Dean of Barnard College (1911–1947), delegate at the 1945 United Nations Conference on International Organization	
Sarah Lee Lippincott	Beta Alpha	Astronomer, professor emerita at Swarthmore College	
Louise Pound	Sigma	Folklorist and professor at the University of Nebraska	

== Business ==
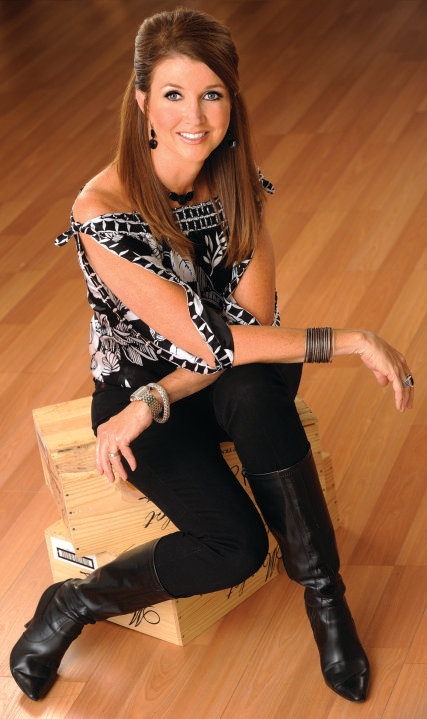
Dixie Carter

Name	Chapter	Notability	References
Ruth Leach Amonette	Pi	First woman Vice President at IBM	
Dixie Carter	Delta Rho	President of TNA Entertainment	
Mary Maxwell Gates	Beta Pi	Banker, civic activist, non-profit executive, and mother of Bill Gates	
Whitney Wolfe Herd	Gamma Phi	Founder and CEO of Bumble, and a co-founder of Tinder	
Elizabeth McKay	Beta Beta	Founder, creative director, and namesake of the designer brand Elizabeth McKay	
Virginia Rometty	Upsilon	Chairwoman, President, and CEO of IBM Corporation	
Kate Spade	Omega	Co-founder, designer, and namesake of the designer brand Kate Spade New York	
Helen Robson Walton	Beta Theta	Philanthropist and wife of Sam Walton, founder of Wal-Mart	

== Entertainment ==
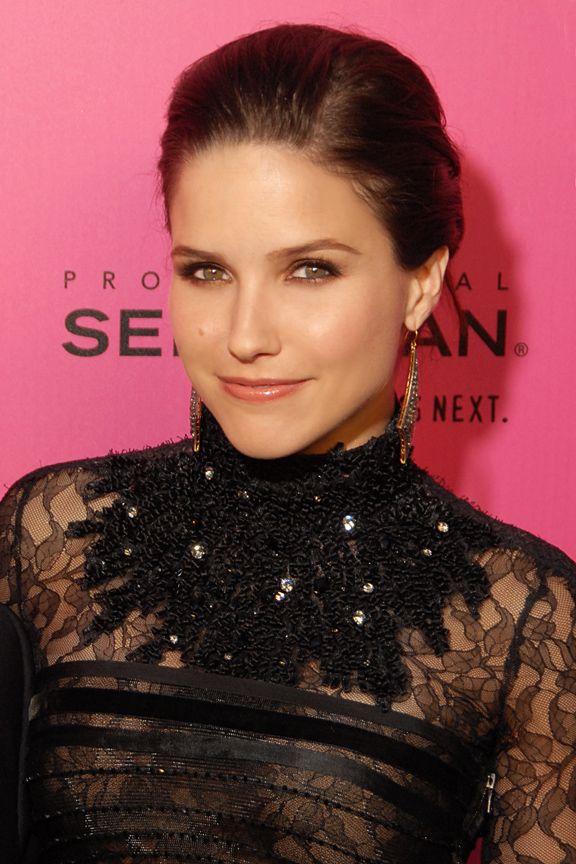
Sophia Bush

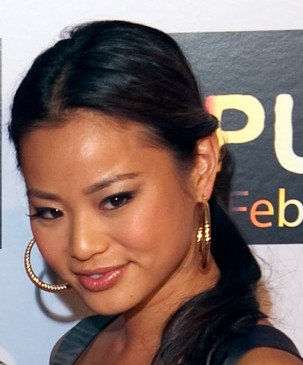
Jamie Chung

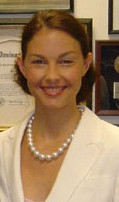
Ashley Judd

Name	Chapter	Notability	References
Jean Bartel	Gamma Xi	Miss America 1943	
Julie Marie Berman	Delta Tau	Daytime Emmy Award-winning actress on General Hospital	
Lo Bosworth	Gamma Xi	Reality show contestant in The Hills and Laguna Beach: The Real Orange County	
Sophia Bush	Delta Tau	Actress, played Brooke Davis on One Tree Hill	
Gretchen Carlson	Beta Eta ^{(Deuteron)}	Miss America 1989, former Fox News anchor, former The Early Show anchor	
Jamie Chung	Epsilon Pi	Actress and reality show contestant known for her participation in The Real World: San Diego and the films Sucker Punch and Sorority Row	
Gretchen Cryer	Iota	Stage actress and writer, known for her work on I'm Getting My Act Together and Taking It on the Road	
Alexandra Curtis	Beta Tau	Miss Rhode Island 2015	
Ann Elder	Iota	Emmy Award-winning screenwriter for The Lily Tomlin Special	
Barbara Feldon	Delta Xi	Actress, Get Smart	
Jane Froman	Theta	Singer, subject of the film With a Song in My Heart	
Annabeth Gish	Delta Beta	Actress, played Monica Reyes on The X-Files	
Greer Grammer	Delta Tau	Actress, Awkward.	
Alexa Havins	Epsilon Delta	Actress, played Babe Carey on All My Children	
Kelley Menighan Hensley	Gamma Phi	Actress, plays Emily Stewart on As the World Turns	
Margaret Hillis	Delta	Grammy Award-winning conductor with the Chicago Symphony Orchestra, founder of the Chicago Symphony Chorus	
Kate Jackson	Delta Rho	Actress, known for her work in Scarecrow and Mrs. King as well as playing Sabrina Duncan on Charlie's Angels	
Ashley Judd	Beta Chi	Actress, known for her roles in A Time to Kill, Kiss the Girls, Double Jeopardy	
Kirstin Maldonado	Beta Theta	Singer, vocal group Pentatonix	
Meghan Markle	Upsilon	Actress, played Rachel Zane on Suits, and Duchess of Sussex	
Nancy Morgan	Gamma Omega	Actress, Grand Theft Auto	
Melody Morris	Epsilon Delta	Reality show contestant on Big Brother	
Sarah Jane Morris	Gamma Phi	Actress, known for her work on Felicity and Brothers and Sisters	
Nancy Olson	Eta	Stage and screen actress, known for her work on Sunset Boulevard	
Jane Pauley	Delta	Television journalist and anchor on Today and Dateline NBC	
Jo Ann Pflug	Delta Kappa	Actress, MASH	
Rachel Platten	Zeta Theta	Singer-songwriter	
Madelyn Pugh	Delta	Television writer, known for her work on The Steve Allen Show and I Love Lucy	
Casey Reinhardt	Eta Beta	Model and reality show contestant in Laguna Beach: The Real Orange County	
Maggie Rose	Epsilon Mu	Country music singer	
Gena Rowlands	Eta	Emmy Award and Golden Globe Award-winning actress	
Maria Sansone	Beta Tau	Correspondent and co-host of LX New York	
Savvy Shields	Gamma Nu	Miss Arkansas 2016 and Miss America 2017	
Kim Stanley	Gamma Beta	Emmy Award-winning stage and screen actress, known for her work in Cat on a Hot Tin Roof	
Helen Wagner	Alpha ^{(Deuteron)}	Actress, played Nancy Hughes on As the World Turns	

== Law ==
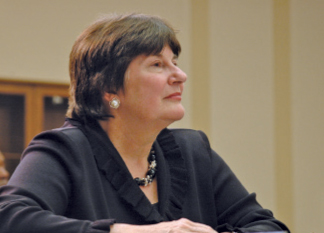
M. Margaret McKeown

Name	Chapter	Notability	References
Carol Bagley Amon	Gamma Kappa	Judge, sits on the United States District Court for the Eastern District of New York	
Susan H. Black	Epsilon Zeta	Judge, sits on the United States Court of Appeals for the Eleventh Circuit	
M. Margaret McKeown	Gamma Omicron	Judge, sits on the United States Court of Appeals for the Ninth Circuit	
Nancy Paterson	Delta Lambda	International war crimes prosecutor	
E. Jean Nelson Penfield	Iota	National President, Kappa Kappa Gamma	

== Literature ==
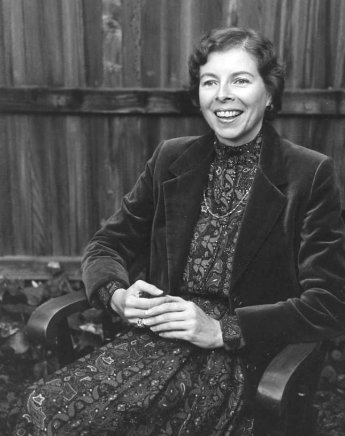
Ann Bannon

Name	Chapter	Notability	References
Ann Bannon	Beta Lambda	Lesbian pulp fiction author	
Dorothy Canfield Fisher	Beta Nu	Author of Understood Betsy and philanthropist	
Neta Lohnes Frazier	Gamma Gamma	Children's author	
Valerie Joan Haig-Brown	Gamma Upsilon	Author, editor, and conservationist	
Julia Ward Howe	Phi (Honorary)	Poet of "The Battle Hymn of the Republic", abolitionist, and social activist	
Phyllis McGinley	Delta Eta	Pulitzer Prize-winning poet	
Alice Duer Miller	Beta Epsilon	Author and poet who wrote for the New York Tribune	
Donna Tartt	Delta Rho	Novelist	
Betty Jane Wylie	Gamma Sigma	Canadian writer and playwright	

== Politics and government ==
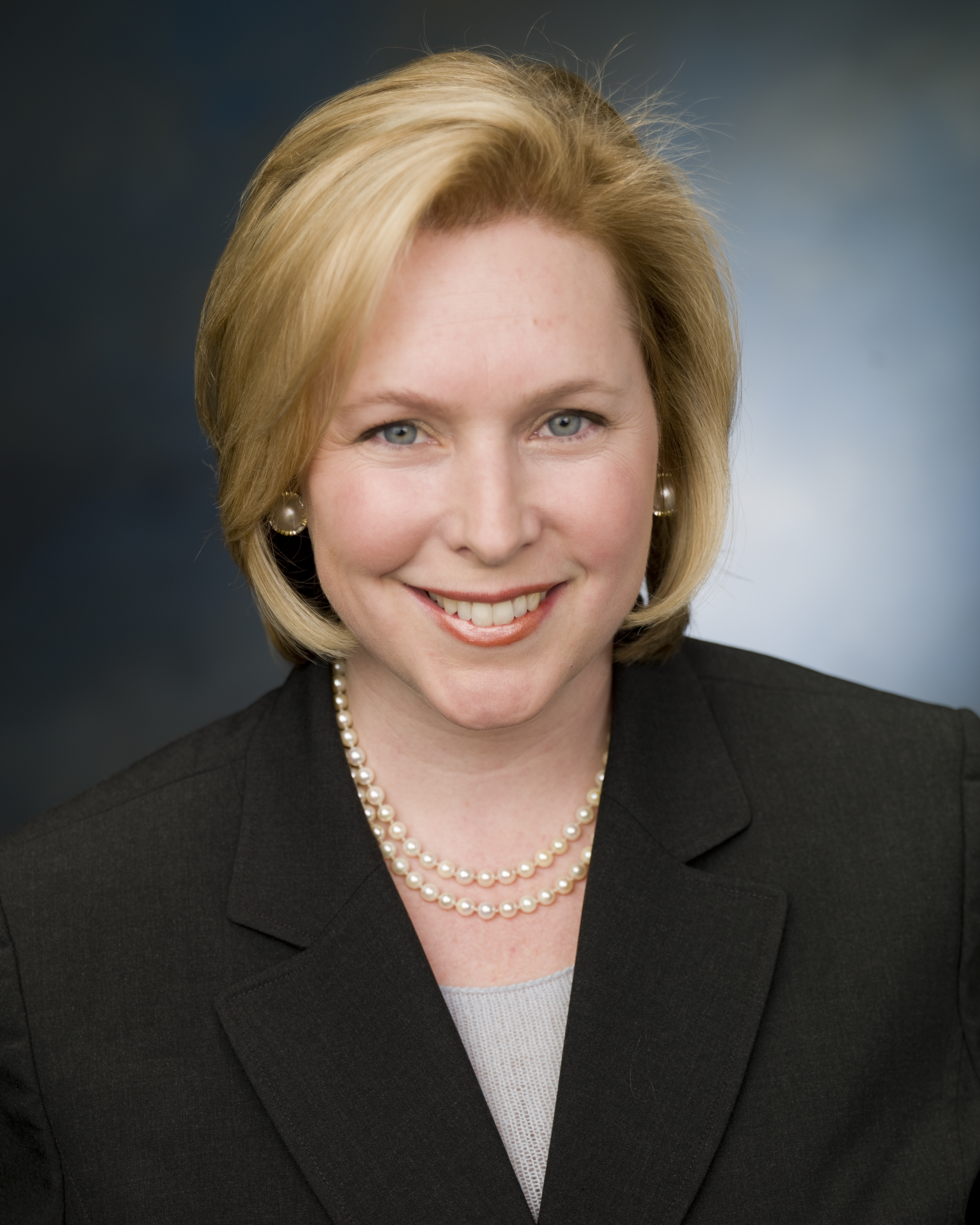
Kirsten Gillibrand

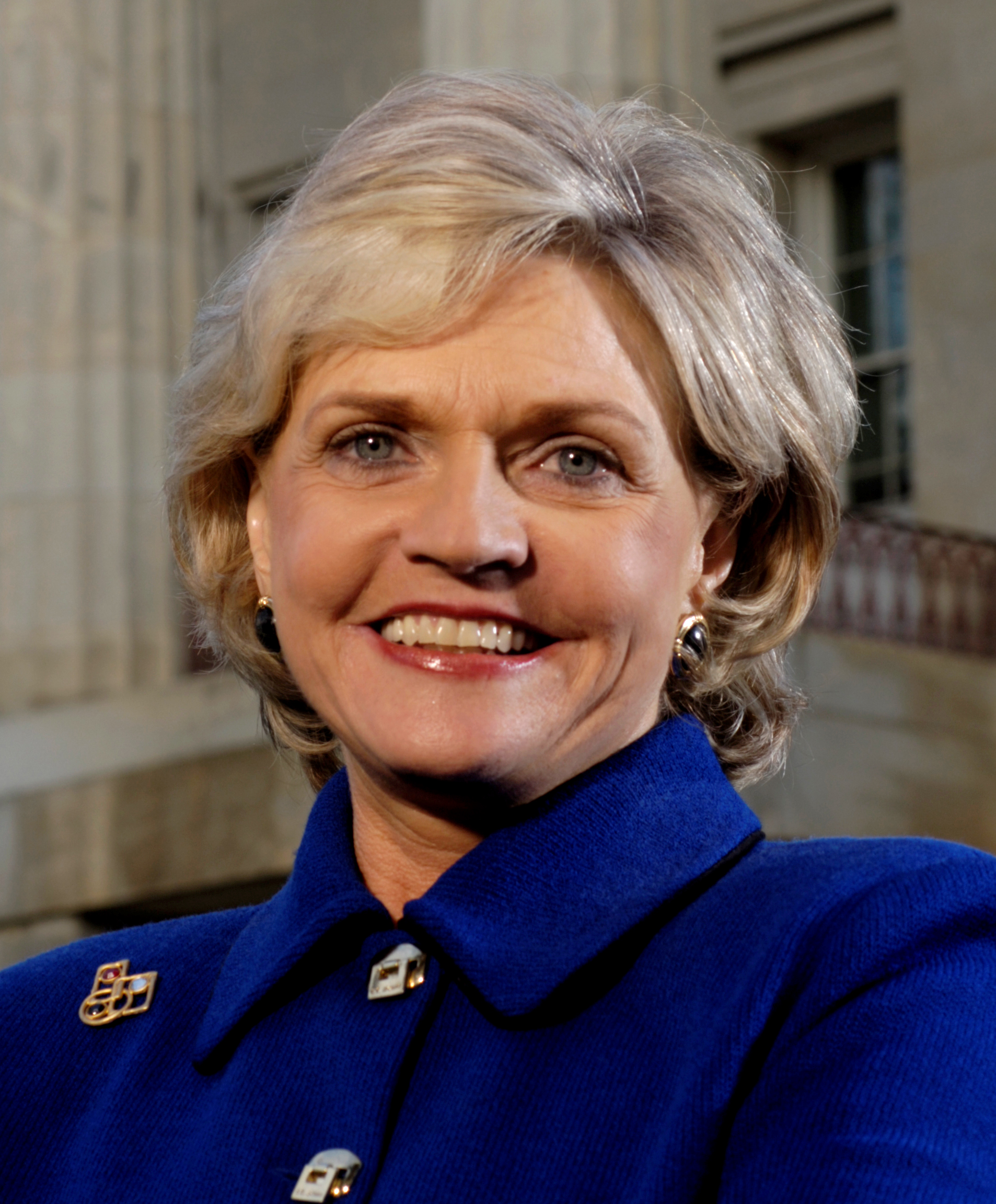
Beverly Perdue

Name	Chapter	Notability	References
Angela Atwood	Delta	Founding member of the Symbionese Liberation Army	
Cindy Axne	Beta Zeta	United States House Representatives from Iowa (2019–present)	
Kay Barnes	Omega	Mayor of Kansas City, Missouri (1999–2007)	
Mary Brooks	Beta Kappa	Director of the United States Mint (1969–1977)	
Shelley Moore Capito	Delta Beta	United States Senate representing West Virginia	
Diane Denish	Gamma Beta	Lieutenant Governor of New Mexico (2003–2011)	
Kirsten Gillibrand	Epsilon Chi	United States Senate from New York (2009–present)	
Emily Gorman	Psi	Director of the Women's Army Corps (1962–1966)	
Lucy Webb Hayes	Rho (Honorary)	20th First Lady of the United States and wife of Rutherford B. Hayes	
Lou Henry Hoover	Beta Eta ^{(Deuteron)}	33rd First Lady of the United States and wife of Herbert Hoover	
Barbara McDougall	Beta Psi	House of Commons of Canada (1984–1993)	
Frances McGovern	Lambda	Ohio House of Representatives (1954–1959)	
Maryon Pearson	Beta Psi	Wife of Lester B. Pearson the 14th Prime Minister of Canada	
Beverly Perdue	Beta Chi	First female governor of North Carolina	
Juliet Poyntz	Beta Epsilon	Co-founder of the Communist Party USA	
Mary Harriman Rumsey	Beta Epsilon	Chair of the Consumer Advisory Board of the National Recovery Administration	
Kate Shelley	Omicron ^{(Deuteron)}	Heroine; saved many lives from near train disaster in 1881	
Mary Kingsbury Simkhovitch	Phi	Social worker, member of the Committee of Fourteen	
Jane M. Swift	Zeta Theta	First female governor of Massachusetts	
Jean Casselman Wadds	Beta Psi	Canadian Diplomat, Canadian politician, represented Grenville—Dundas (1958–1968)	
Elaine C. Wagner	Mu	United States Navy Rear Admiral (retired) and former Chief, United States Navy Dental Corps	
Amelia Himes Walker	Beta Iota	American suffragist and women's rights activist.	
Mary Carlin Yates	Gamma Mu	U.S. Ambassador to Burundi (1999–2002) and Ghana (2002–2005)	

== Science and engineering ==
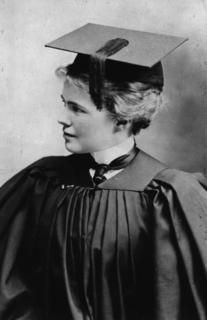
Emily Barringer

Name	Chapter	Notability	References
Emily Barringer	Psi	First woman resident at New York City's Gouverneur Hospital	
Edith Clarke	Eta	First woman elected fellow of the American Institute of Electrical Engineers	
Gertrude Van Wagenen	Beta Zeta	biologist and professor at Yale School of Medicine, pioneering primate research on reproduction and contraception	
Mareta West	Beta Theta	First female astrogeologist, chose the site for the first human Moon landing	

== Sports ==
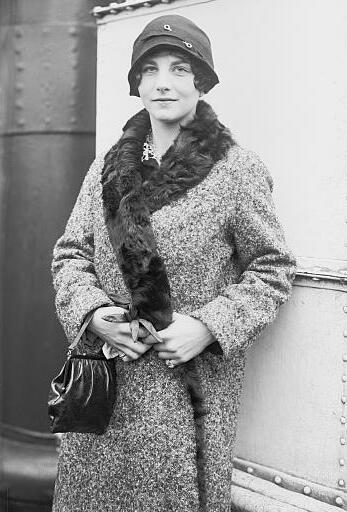
Helen Wills Roarke

Name	Chapter	Notability	References
Roberta Alison	Gamma Pi	Professional tennis player, runner-up at the 1965 Cincinnati Masters	
Kristin Armstrong	Beta Kappa	Cyclist, two-time Olympic gold medalist in the individual time trial in 2008 and 2012.	
Peggy Kirk Bell	Delta Epsilon	Professional golfer, won the 1949 Titleholders Championship	
Patty Berg	Chi	Professional golfer and a founding member of Ladies Professional Golf Association (LPGA), inductee of the World Golf Hall of Fame	
Jane Blalock	Delta Epsilon	Professional golfer, member of the LPGA	
Alana Cook	Beta Eta Deuteron	Professional soccer player	
Emma Gatcliffe	Beta Beta Deuteron	Olympic alpine skier	
Eileen Gu	Beta Eta Deuteron	Olympic freestyle skier	
Doris Hart	Delta Kappa	Professional tennis player, won the U.S. Women's Open in 1954 and 1955, inductee of the International Tennis Hall of Fame	
Eleanor (Elle) Logan	Beta Eta Deuteron	Rower, the first American rower to win a gold medal in three consecutive Olympics (2008, 2012, 2016)	
Kelley O'Hara	Beta Eta Deuteron	Professional soccer player, Sky Blue FC. Olympic gold medalist with the U.S. Women's National Team at the London Games 2012. 2015 and 2019 FIFA Women's World Cup Champion.	
Helen Wills Roarke	Pi ^{(Deuteron)}	Professional tennis player, won the French Championships four times, the U.S. Championships seven times, and Wimbledon eight times	
Betty Robinson Schwartz	Upsilon	Received the gold for the 100 m at the 1928 Olympics, and again at the 1936 Olympics for the 4 × 100 m relay	
Melissa Seidemann	Beta Eta Deuteron	Water polo player, 2012 Olympic Gold medal	
Hollis Stacy	Delta Epsilon	Professional golfer, won the U.S. Women's Open in 1977, 1978, and 1984	
Maggie Steffens	Beta Eta Deuteron	Water polo player, 2012 Olympic Gold medal	
Evelyn Stevens	Epsilon Chi	Racing cyclist	
Genevra Stone	Zeta Phi	Rower, Single Sculls, competed in London 2012, and earned Silver medal in Rio 2016	
Isabella Tobias	Gamma Phi	Professional ice dancer, represented Lithuania at Sochi 2014, won bronze at 2011 Skate America, and placed in the top ten at two European Championships	
Donna de Varona	Gamma Xi	Swimmer, received two golds at the 1964 Olympics, and again at the 1963 Pan American Games	
Sharon Weber	Beta Nu	Gymnast, judge at the 1984 Summer Olympics	
Beth Whittall	Gamma Delta	Canadian swimmer, won the Lou Marsh Trophy	
Hazel Hotchkiss Wightman	Pi ^{(Deuteron)}	Professional tennis player, won the U.S. Championships in 1909, 1910, 1911, and 1919	

== See also ==
- List of Kappa Kappa Gamma chapters
