= Fumio =

- Gender: Male

Origin
- Origin: Japanese
- Meaning: Different meanings depending on the kanji used

Fumio (written: 文夫, 文雄, 文男, 史朗, 史生, 章生, 富美雄, 富美男 or フミオ in katakana) is a masculine Japanese given name. Notable people with the name include:

- Fumio (illustrator) (フミオ), Japanese illustrator
- Fumio Abe (阿部 文男; 1922–2006), Japanese politician
- Fumio Asaki (浅木 文雄), Japanese ski jumping sports official
- Fumio Asakura (朝倉 文夫; 1883–1964), Japanese sculptor
- Fumio Demura (出村 文男; 1938–2023), Japanese karateka
- Fumio Fujimura (藤村 富美男; 1916–1992), Japanese baseball player
- Fumio Gotō (後藤 文夫; 1884–1980), Japanese politician
- Fumio Hayasaka (早坂 文雄; 1914–1955), Japanese composer
- Fumio Hayashi (林 文夫; born 1952), Japanese economist
- Fumio Hayashi (doctor) (林 文雄; 1900–1947), Japanese physician
- Fumio Hisamatsu (久松 文雄; born 1943), Japanese manga artist and character designer
- Fumio Igarashi (五十嵐 文男; born 1958), Japanese figure skater
- Fumio Imamura (今村 文男; born 1966), Japanese racewalker
- Fumio Inagaki (稲垣 史生), Japanese microbiologist
- Fumio Itabashi (板橋 文夫; born 1949), Japanese jazz pianist and composer
- Fumio Ito (伊藤 史朗; 1939–1991), Japanese motorcycle racer
- Fumio Iwai (岩井 文男; born 1960), Japanese politician
- Fumio Kamamoto (釜本 文男; 1918–2011), Japanese hammer thrower
- Fumio Kamei (亀井 文夫; 1908–1987), Japanese film director
- Fumio Karashima (辛島文雄; 1948–2017), Japanese jazz pianist
- Fumio Kishida (岸田 文雄; born 1957), Japanese politician, former Prime Minister of Japan
- Fumio Kurokawa (黒川 文男; born 1932), Japanese storyboard artist and anime director
- Fumio Kyūma (久間 章生; born 1940), Japanese politician
- Fumio Nanjo (南條 史生; born 1949), Japanese art director
- Fumio Nanri (南里 文夫; 1910–1975), Japanese jazz trumpeter
- Fumio Niwa (丹羽 文雄; 1904–2005), Japanese writer
- Fumio Nutahara (奴田原 文雄; born 1963), Japanese rally driver
- Fumio Ōtsubo (大坪 文雄; born 1945), Japanese chief executive
- Fumio Ryosenan (了泉庵 文男; born 1927), Japanese sport shooter
- Fumio Saito (斎藤 文夫; born 1953), Japanese basketball player
- Fumio Sasahara (笹原 富美雄; born 1945), Japanese judoka
- Fumio Toyoda (1947–2001), Japanese aikidoka
- Fumio Ueda (上田 文雄; born 1948), Japanese lawyer, politician and activist
- Fumio Usami (born 1968), Japanese mixed martial artist
- Fumio Watanabe (渡辺 文雄; 1929–2004), Japanese actor
- Fumio Yanoguchi (矢野口 文雄; 1917–1985), Japanese audio engineer
