= Gaza peace summit =

Diplomatic meeting in Sharm El Sheikh, Egypt

Gaza peace summit Sharm El-Sheikh Peace Summit

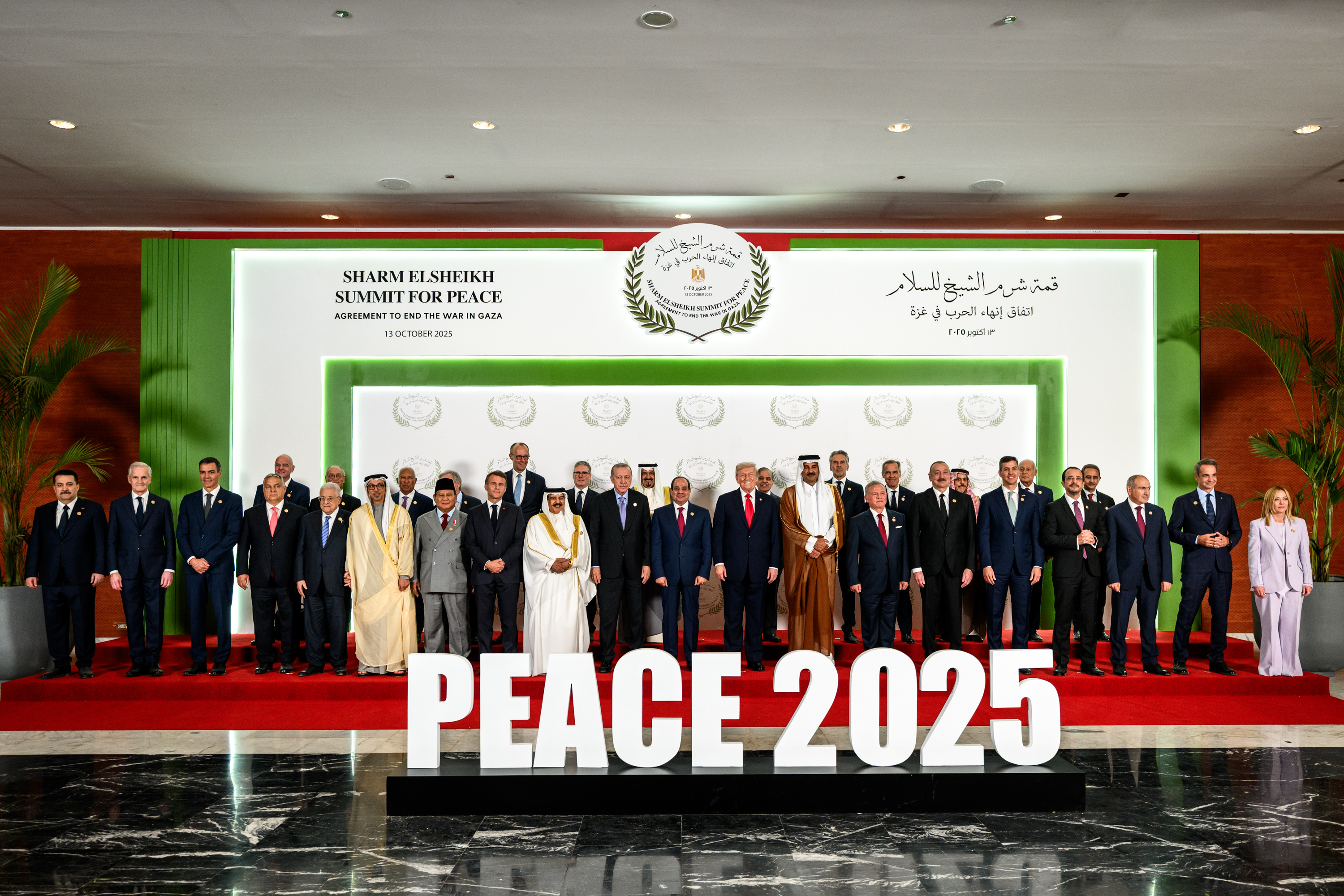
- Host country: Egypt
- Date: 13 October 2025
- Cities: Sharm El Sheikh
- Venue: Sharm El Shaikh International Convention Centre
- Chair: Abdel Fattah el-Sisi; Donald Trump

Key points
- Gaza peace plan, Gaza war

The Gaza peace summit, also known as the Sharm El-Sheikh Peace Summit, was a diplomatic meeting held on 13 October 2025 in Sharm El Sheikh, Egypt, following an agreement to implement the first phase of the Gaza peace plan to end the Gaza war which began in 2023. Representatives from around 30 countries attended the summit, which was co-chaired by presidents Donald Trump of the United States and Abdel Fattah el-Sisi of Egypt, although representatives for Israel and Hamas were absent.

== Background ==
The Gaza war began on 7 October 2023 following a series of coordinated armed attacks carried out by a group of Palestinian militant groups led by Hamas in southern Israel. On 8 October 2025, the Israeli government and Hamas agreed to the first part of a Gaza peace plan proposed by US president Donald Trump which resulted in the cessation of hostilities on 10 October 2025. Plans for an international summit relating to the next steps in the peace process were announced by Trump later that day.

Trump gave a speech to the Israeli Knesset and guests in the morning before attending the summit, urging Israel to focus on peace and prosperity in the Middle East and calling on Israeli President Isaac Herzog to pardon Prime Minister Benjamin Netanyahu on the various legal charges he faced. Trump also met with hostage families.

== Aims ==
The summit was to discuss the next steps in the implementation of the Gaza peace plan and it was intended that the focus should be on the future governance of the Gaza Strip, security and humanitarian assistance.

== Attendees ==
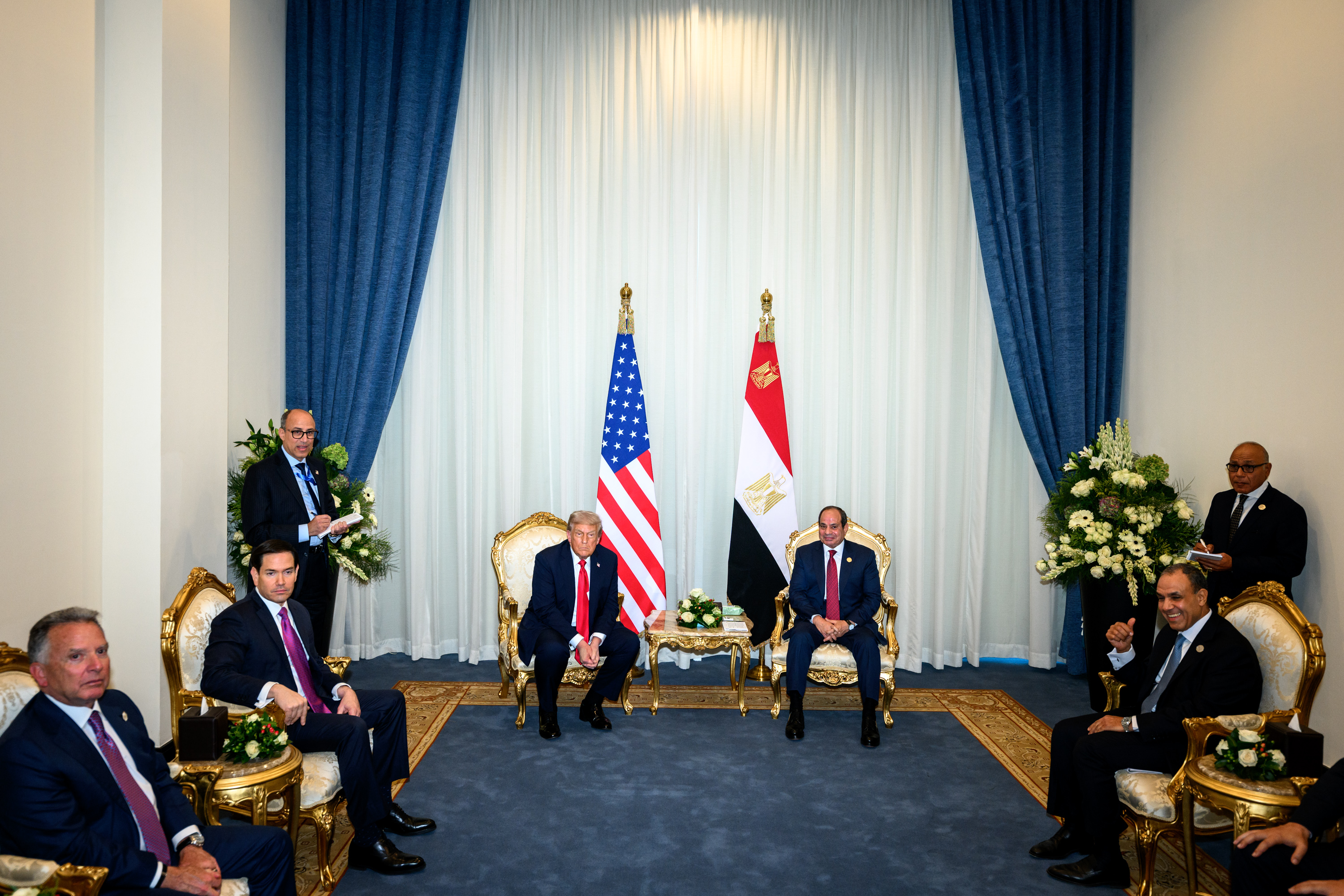
U.S. President Donald Trump and Egyptian President Abdel Fattah el-Sisi

Video of President Trump's speech at a Middle East Peace Ceremony

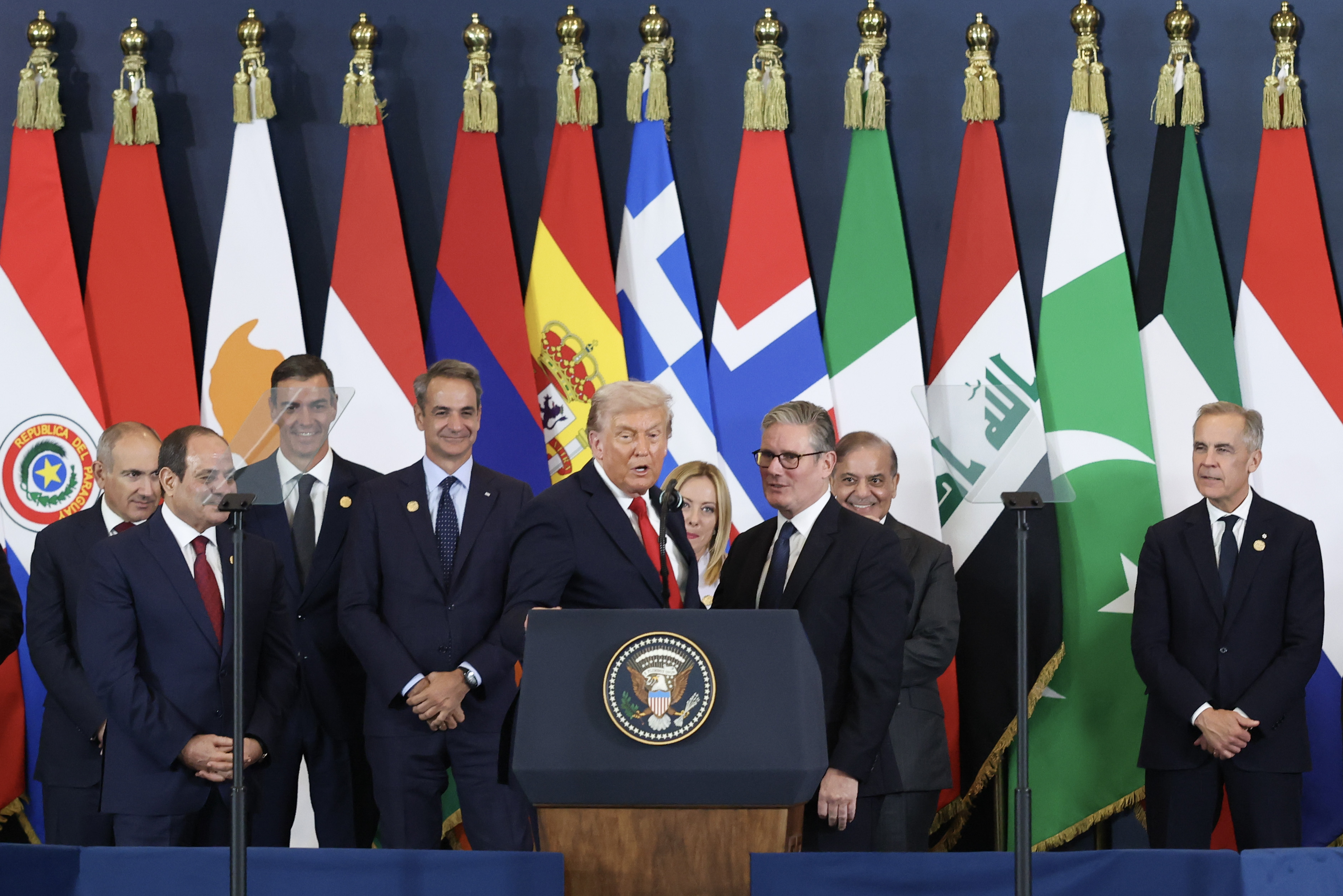
Gaza peace summit on 13 October 2025

Representatives from around 30 countries and from several international organisations were invited to attend.

Attendance was as follows:

UN member and observer states

Key
Summit co-chair

State	Represented by	Title
Armenia	Nikol Pashinyan	Prime Minister
Azerbaijan	Ilham Aliyev	President
Bahrain	Hamad bin Isa Al Khalifa	King
Canada	Mark Carney	Prime Minister
Cyprus	Nikos Christodoulides	President
Egypt	Abdel Fattah el-Sisi	President
France	Emmanuel Macron	President
Germany	Friedrich Merz	Chancellor
Greece	Kyriakos Mitsotakis	Prime Minister
Hungary	Viktor Orbán	Prime Minister
India	Kirti Vardhan Singh	Minister of State for External Affairs
Indonesia	Prabowo Subianto	President
Iraq	Mohammed Shia' al-Sudani	Prime Minister
Italy	Giorgia Meloni	Prime Minister
Japan	Fumio Iwai	Ambassador
Jordan	Abdullah II	King
Kuwait	Ahmad Al-Abdullah Al-Sabah	Prime Minister
Netherlands	Dick Schoof	Prime Minister
Norway	Jonas Gahr Støre	Prime Minister
Oman	Badr bin Hamad Al Busaidi	Minister of Foreign Affairs
Pakistan	Shehbaz Sharif	Prime Minister
Palestine	Mahmoud Abbas	President
Paraguay	Santiago Peña	President
Qatar	Tamim bin Hamad Al Thani	Emir
Saudi Arabia	Faisal bin Farhan Al Saud	Minister of Foreign Affairs
Spain	Pedro Sánchez	Prime Minister
Turkey	Recep Tayyip Erdoğan	President
United Arab Emirates	Mansour bin Zayed Al Nahyan	Vice President
United Kingdom	Keir Starmer	Prime Minister
United States	Donald Trump	President

International organisations

Organisation		Represented by	Title
	Arab League	Ahmed Aboul Gheit	Secretary General
Europe	European Union	António Costa	European Council President
	FIFA	Gianni Infantino	President
	United Nations	António Guterres	Secretary General

Absences

Iranian president Masoud Pezeshkian and foreign minister Abbas Araghchi were invited but declined the invitation, with Araghchi later posting on social media that "Neither President Pezeshkian nor I can engage with counterparts who have attacked the Iranian People and continue to threaten and sanction us". The prime minister of Israel, Benjamin Netanyahu, was invited to attend by Sisi at Trump's request, and though he initially confirmed his attendance, he ended up declining as the summit coincided with the Jewish holiday of Simchat Torah. Reuters reported that Netanyahu's attendance was diplomatically opposed by Turkish president Recep Tayyip Erdoğan and other leaders.

== Outcomes ==
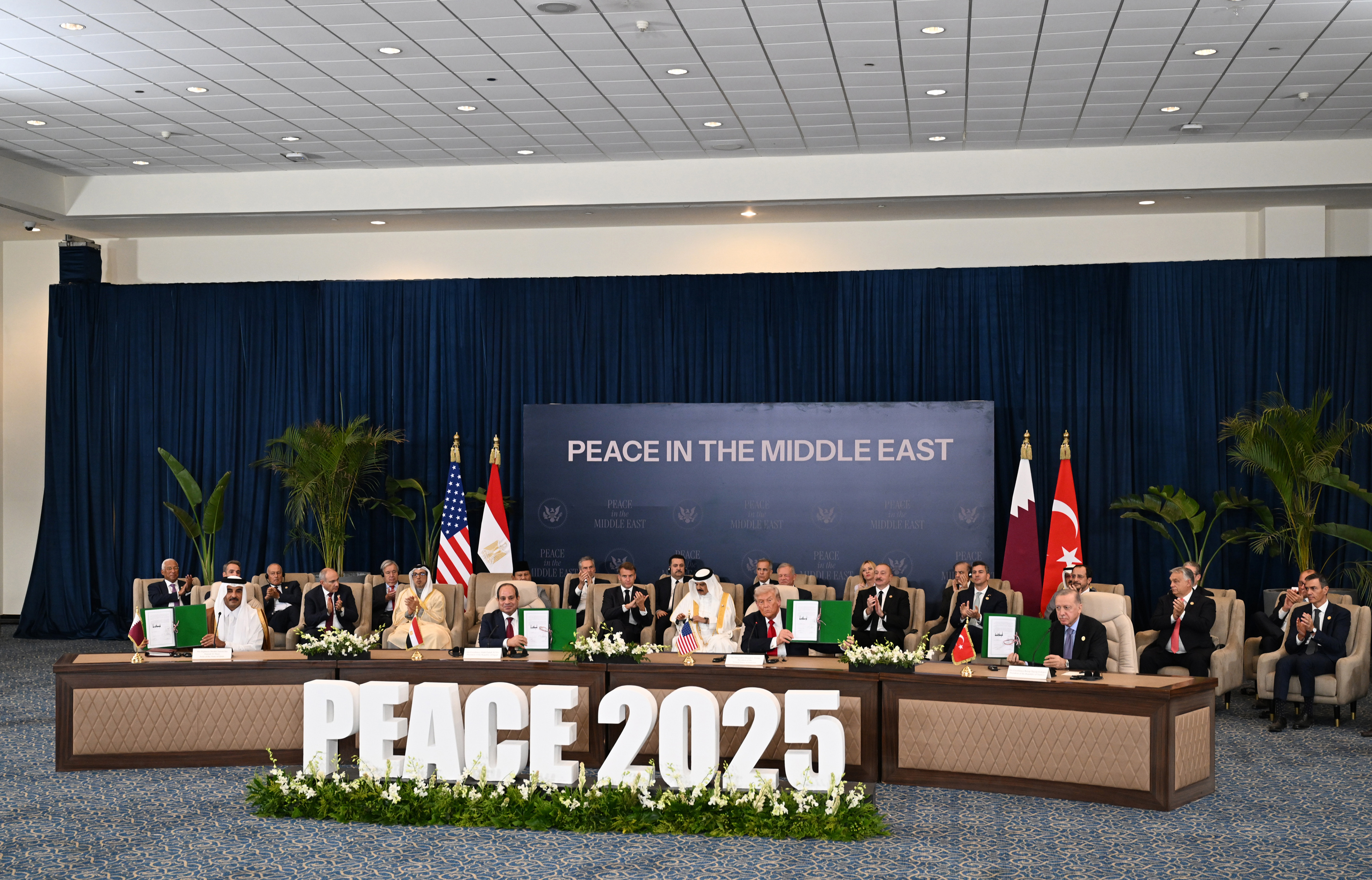
Signing of the joint declaration

Egyptian President Abdel Fattah el-Sisi, U.S. President Donald Trump, Qatari Emir Sheikh Tamim bin Hamad Al Thani, and Turkish President Recep Tayyip Erdogan all signed a joint declaration known as the "Trump Declaration for Enduring Peace and Prosperity." However, representatives of Israel and Hamas, the central parties of the Gaza war, did not attend.

Trump stated that the signed document contains "a lot of rules and regulations" and that "It's very comprehensive", however the New York Times assessed that the published document did not contain substantive details. The joint agreement was criticized for being simplistic and offering few details concerning how to achieve a regional peace agreement, including in Gaza. By some analysts, the whole summit itself was seen as largely symbolical and virtue signaling, rather than a fixed and substantive peace deal.

=== The Trump Declaration for Enduring Peace and Prosperity ===
We, the undersigned, welcome the truly historic commitment and implementation by all parties to the Trump Peace Agreement, ending more than two years of profound suffering and loss — opening a new chapter for the region defined by hope, security, and a shared vision for peace and prosperity.

We support and stand behind President Trump’s sincere efforts to end the war in Gaza and bring lasting peace to the Middle East. Together, we will implement this agreement in a manner that ensures peace, security, stability, and opportunity for all peoples of the region, including both Palestinians and Israelis.

We understand that lasting peace will be one in which both Palestinians and Israelis can prosper with their fundamental human rights protected, their security guaranteed, and their dignity upheld.

We affirm that meaningful progress emerges through cooperation and sustained dialogue, and that strengthening bonds among nations and peoples serves the enduring interests of regional and global peace and stability.

We recognize the deep historical and spiritual significance of this region to the faith communities whose roots are intertwined with the land of the region — Christianity, Islam, and Judaism among them. Respect for these sacred connections and the protection of their heritage sites shall remain paramount in our commitment to peaceful coexistence.

We are united in our determination to dismantle extremism and radicalization in all its forms. No society can flourish when violence and racism is normalized, or when radical ideologies threaten the fabric of civil life. We commit to addressing the conditions that enable extremism and to promoting education, opportunity, and mutual respect as foundations for lasting peace.

We hereby commit to the resolution of future disputes through diplomatic engagement and negotiation rather than through force or protracted conflict. We acknowledge that the Middle East cannot endure a persistent cycle of prolonged warfare, stalled negotiations, or the fragmentary, incomplete, or selective application of successfully negotiated terms. The tragedies witnessed over the past two years must serve as an urgent reminder that future generations deserve better than the failures of the past.

We seek tolerance, dignity, and equal opportunity for every person, ensuring this region is a place where all can pursue their aspirations in peace, security, and economic prosperity, regardless of race, faith, or ethnicity.

We pursue a comprehensive vision of peace, security, and shared prosperity in the region, grounded in the principles of mutual respect and shared destiny.

In this spirit, we welcome the progress achieved in establishing comprehensive and durable peace arrangements in the Gaza Strip, as well as the friendly and mutually beneficial relationship between Israel and its regional neighbors. We pledge to work collectively to implement and sustain this legacy, building institutional foundations upon which future generations may thrive together in peace.

We commit ourselves to a future of enduring peace.

Donald J. Trump

President of the United States of America

Abdel Fattah El-Sisi

President of the Arab Republic of Egypt

Tamim bin Hamad Al-Thani

Emir of the State of Qatar

Recep Tayyip Erdoğan

President of the Republic of Türkiye

== See also ==
- Gaza International Transitional Authority
- Israeli–Palestinian peace process
- July 2025 Conference on the Implementation of the Two-State Solution
- New York Declaration
