= Bianchetti (surname) =

Bianchetti is an Italian surname. Notable people with the surname include:

- Davide Bianchetti (born 1977), Italian squash player
- Fabio Bianchetti, Italian figure skating official
- Matteo Bianchetti (born 1993), Italian footballer
- Sebastiano Bianchetti (born 1996), Italian shot putter
- Suzanne Bianchetti (1889–1936), French actress
