= Lee Hak-rae =

South Korean judoka (born 1938)

Lee Hak-Rae (born 1938) is a retired South Korean judoka and sport official best known for taking the Judge's Oath at the 1988 Summer Olympics in Seoul.
