= List of Kappa Kappa Gamma chapters =

Kappa Kappa Gamma is a collegiate women's fraternity founded in 1870 at Monmouth College in Monmouth, Illinois.

== Collegiate chapters ==
In the following list, active chapters are indicated in bold, and inactive chapters and institutions are in italics.

Chapter	Charter date and range	Institution	Location	Status	Ref.
Alpha (see **Alpha Deuteron**)	October 13, 1870 – 1884	Monmouth College	Monmouth, Illinois	Reestablished	(Note: The chapter went inactive because of anti-fraternity policies at the college. It was revived as Alpha Deuteron in 1934.)
Beta	January 1, 1871 – 1874	St. Mary's School	Knoxville, Illinois	Inactive	
Gamma	January 1872 – 1875	Smithson College	Logansport, Indiana	Inactive	(Note: Chapter went inactive when the college prohibited fraternities.)
**Delta**	October 12, 1872	Indiana University Bloomington	Bloomington, Indiana	Active	
**Epsilon**	November 25, 1873	Illinois Wesleyan University	Bloomington, Illinois	Active	
Zeta	January 1, 1874 – 1876	Rockford Female Seminary	Rockford, Illinois	Inactive	
**Eta**	February 2, 1875	University of Wisconsin–Madison	Madison, Wisconsin	Active	
**Theta**	April 2, 1875	University of Missouri	Columbia, Missouri	Active	
**Iota**	March 13, 1875	DePauw University	Greencastle, Indiana	Active	(Note: Chapter formed at Indiana Asbury University, now DePauw University.)
**Kappa**	June 9, 1881	Hillsdale College	Hillsdale, Michigan	Active	
Lambda	June 10, 1877 – 2022	University of Akron	Akron, Ohio	Inactive	(Note: Chapter formed from the Carey Society at Buchtel College, now the University of Akron.)
**Mu**	January 2, 1878	Butler University	Indianapolis, Indiana	Active	
**Nu**	January 31, 1879 – October 30, 1884	Franklin College	Franklin, Indiana	Inactive	
Xi	May 17, 1882 – 1944	Adrian College	Adrian, Michigan	Inactive	
Omicron (see **Omicron Deuteron**)	April 10, 1880 – February 10, 1890	Simpson College	Indianola, Iowa	Active	(Note: Chapter was closed because of the low standard of the college. It was revived as Omicron Deuteron in 1990.)
Pi (see **Pi Deuteron**)	May 22, 1880 – 1885	University of California, Berkeley	Berkeley, California	Reestablished	(Note: Chapter was closed due to administrative opposition. It was revived as Pi Deuteron in 1895.)
Rho (see **Rho Deuteron**)	November 25, 1880 – 1884	Ohio Wesleyan University	Delaware, Ohio	Reestablished	(Note: The chapter closed when the university decided that women could not belong to secret societies.)
**Sigma**	May 19, 1884	University of Nebraska–Lincoln	Lincoln, Nebraska	Active	(Note: Chapter formed from Tau Tau Tau, established in 1882.)
Tau	January 1, 1881 – 1882	Lasell Seminary	Auburndale, Massachusetts	Inactive	
Upsilon	April 18, 1882 – 2022	Northwestern University	Evanston, Illinois	Inactive	
Phi	May 10, 1882 – 1971	Boston University	Boston, Massachusetts	Inactive	
**Chi**	April 21, 1880	University of Minnesota	Minneapolis, Minnesota	Active	(Note: The chapter was supposed to be named Xi, in Greek alphabet order. However, a clerical error confused the Greek letter Chi (X) with the written name Xi.)
Psi (see **Psi Deuteron**)	November 27, 1883 – October 1969	Cornell University	Ithaca, New York	Reestablished	(Note: Chapter was revived as Psi Deuteron in 1977.)
**Omega**	December 17, 1883	University of Kansas	Lawrence, Kansas	Active	
Beta Alpha	March 20, 1890 – July 1, 1977	University of Pennsylvania	Philadelphia, Pennsylvania	Inactive	
Beta Beta (see **Beta Beta Deuteron**)	September 26, 1881 – 1903	St. Lawrence University	Canton, New York	Reestablished	(Note: Beta Beta chapter was formed from the Browning Society, established in 1875. It closed when Kappa Kappa Gamma withdrew its charters from small colleges. The chapter continued to operate as Zeta Phi (local). It was reinstalled as Beta Beta Deuteron in 1915.)
Beta Gamma	May 15, 1876 – February 14, 1914	Wooster College	Wooster, Ohio	Inactive	(Note: The chapter was originally called Gamma (second) but was renamed Beta Gamma after the fraternity changed its naming conventions in 1890. Fraternities and sororities were banned at Wooster in 1913, but many evolved into local organizations. The Wooster chapter became Pi Kappa (local). In addition, two other local sororities trace their origin from the original ΚΚΓ group: Epsilon Kappa Omicron (local) split from Pi Kappa in 1943, as did Alpha Gamma Phi (local) in 1983.)
**Beta Delta**	October 2, 1890	University of Michigan	Ann Arbor, Michigan	Active	
Beta Epsilon	January 16, 1891 – June 28, 1917	Barnard College	New York City, New York	Inactive	(Note: Chapter closed when the college no longer recognized Greek letter organizations.)
**Beta Zeta**	May 2, 1882	University of Iowa	Iowa City, Iowa	Active	(Note: Chapter was formed as Zeta (second) but was changed to Zeta Deuteron in 1890 after changes to the fraternity's naming conventions.)
Beta Eta (see **Beta Eta Deuteron**)	June 10, 1892 – 1944	Stanford University	Stanford, California	Reestablished	(Note: The chapter closed when the dean of women students banned women's fraternities and sororities. It was revived in 1978 as Beta Eta Deuteron.)
**Beta Theta**	August 25, 1914	University of Oklahoma	Norman, Oklahoma	Active	(Note: Chapter formed from Sigma Tau Omega, established in 1912.)
Beta Iota	June 3, 1893 – May 12, 1934	Swarthmore College	Swarthmore, Pennsylvania	Inactive	(Note: Chapter closed when the college banned women's fraternities.)
**Beta Kappa**	February 26, 1916	University of Idaho	Moscow, Idaho	Active	(Note: Chapter formed from Omega Pi, established in 1911.)
**Pi Deuteron** (see Pi)	August 5, 1897	University of California, Berkeley	Berkeley, California	Active	(Note: After going dormant, Pi chapter was revived as Pi Deuteron by absorbing Sorosis, established in 1893.)
**Beta Lambda**	April 28, 1899	University of Illinois Urbana-Champaign	Urbana, Illinois	Active	
**Beta Mu**	April 5, 1901	University of Colorado Boulder	Boulder, Colorado	Active	(Note: Chapter formed from the Althea Society, established in 1899.)
**Beta Nu**	October 12, 1888 – 2015; 2018	Ohio State University	Columbus, Ohio	Active	(Note: Chapter was originally named Nu (second) but became Beta Nu in 1890 when the fraternity changed its naming conventions.)
**Beta Xi**	May 12, 1902	University of Texas at Austin	Austin, Texas	Active	(Note: Chapter formed from Sigma Sigma Sigma, established in 1898.)
**Beta Omicron**	May 11, 1904	Tulane University	New Orleans, Louisiana	Active	(Note: Chapter formed at Newcomb College of Tulane University, now Tulane University.)
**Beta Pi**	February 4, 1905	University of Washington	Seattle, Washington	Active	(Note: Chapter formed from Alpha Kappa Gamma, established in 1900.)
Beta Rho (see **Beta Rho Deuteron**)	June 6, 1885 – 1885	University of Cincinnati	Cincinnati, Ohio	Reestablished	(Note: The chapter was re-established as Beta Rho Deuteron in 1914.)
**Beta Rho Deuteron** (see Beta Rho)	January 1, 1900	University of Cincinnati	Cincinnati, Ohio	Active	(Note: The Beta Rho chapter was revived as Beta Rho Deuteron by absorbing Alpha Phi Psi, established in 1904.)
Beta Sigma	May 20, 1905 – April 1954	Adelphi College	Garden City, New York	Inactive	(Note: Chapter formed from the Question Mark Club, established in 1903.)
**Beta Tau**	October 19, 1883	Syracuse University	Syracuse, New York	Active	(Note: Chapter was originally called Tau (second) but was renamed Beta Tau when the fraternity changed its naming conventions in 1890.)
**Beta Upsilon**	December 22, 1906	West Virginia University	Morgantown, West Virginia	Active	(Note: Chapter formed from Kappa Delta, established in 1899.)
Beta Phi	March 20, 1909 – 2021	University of Montana	Missoula, Montana	Inactive	(Note: Chapter formed from Delta Sigma, established in 1904. The chapter closed in 2021 due to low recruitment of members and its failure to recover debts caused by embezzlement by its house mother in 2015.)
**Beta Chi**	February 12, 1910	University of Kentucky	Lexington, Kentucky	Active	(Note: Chapter formed from Chi Epsilon Chi, established in 1901.)
Beta Psi (First) (see **Beta Psi (Second)**)	May 24, 1911 – May 1925	Victoria College	Toronto, Ontario, Canada	Moved	(Note: Chapter formed from Xi Zeta Gamma (local), established in 1906. The school had previously moved from the nearby town of Cobourg to Toronto, when it federated with Toronto University in 1890. Now as Victoria University, the original school remains a unit of Toronto University, while the chapter took on an expanded role of serving all of the University of Toronto, officially in 1925, as Beta Psi (Second).)
**Beta Omega**	January 11, 1913	University of Oregon	Eugene, Oregon	Active	(Note: Chapter formed from Gamma Delta Gamma, established in 1908.)
**Beta Beta Deuteron** (see Beta Beta)	October 16, 1915	St. Lawrence University	Canton, New York	Active	
**Gamma Alpha**	September 23, 1916	Kansas State University	Manhattan, Kansas	Active	(Note: Chapter formed from Lambda Lambda Theta, established in 1906.)
**Gamma Beta**	April 5, 1918	University of New Mexico	Albuquerque, New Mexico	Active	(Note: Chapter formed from Alpha Gamma, established in 1915.)
**Gamma Gamma**	April 29, 1918	Whitman College	Walla Walla, Washington	Active	(Note: Chapter formed from Beta Sigma, established in 1910.)
**Gamma Delta**	January 24, 1919	Purdue University	West Lafayette, Indiana	Active	(Note: Chapter formed from Mu Sigma Alpha, established in 1912.)
**Gamma Epsilon**	February 21, 1919	University of Pittsburgh	Pittsburgh, Pennsylvania	Active	(Note: Chapter formed from Epsilon Rho Omicron, established in 1916.)
**Gamma Zeta**	January 3, 1920 – February 13, 1888	University of Arizona	Tucson, Arizona	Active	(Note: Chapter formed from Alpha Sigma, established in 1916.)
**Gamma Eta**	May 7, 1920	Washington State University	Pullman, Washington	Active	(Note: Chapter formed from Zeta Phi, established in 1916.)
**Gamma Theta**	April 30, 1921	Drake University	Des Moines, Iowa	Active	(Note: Chapter formed from Epsilon Tau Sigma, established in 1903.)
**Gamma Iota**	September 10, 1921	Washington University in St. Louis	St. Louis, Missouri	Active	
**Gamma Kappa**	February 16, 1923	College of William & Mary	Williamsburg, Virginia	Active	(Note: Chapter formed from Upsilon Delta Beta, established in 1920.)
Gamma Lambda	June 1, 1923 – 1969	Middlebury College	Middlebury, Vermont	Inactive	(Note: Chapter formed from Alpha Chi, established in 1889.)
**Gamma Mu**	June 7, 1924	Oregon State University	Corvallis, Oregon	Active	(Note: Chapter formed from Gamma Iota, established in 1921.)
**Gamma Nu**	April 9, 1925	University of Arkansas	Fayetteville, Arkansas	Active	(Note: Chapter formed from Kappa Kappa Kappa, established in 1916.)
**Beta Psi (Second)** (see Beta Psi (First))	May 1925	University of Toronto	Toronto, Ontario, Canada	Active	(Note: Chapter moved (in this case, ~broadened its scope) from Victoria College to that school's federation partner, the entire University of Toronto.)
**Rho Deuteron** (see Rho)	May 1, 1925	Ohio Wesleyan University	Delaware, Ohio	Active	(Note: Rho chapter was revived as Rho Deuteron by absorbing Rho Sigma, established in 1922.)
**Gamma Xi**	May 8, 1925	University of California, Los Angeles	Los Angeles, California	Active	(Note: Chapter formed from Phi Delta Pi, established in 1918.)
**Gamma Omicron**	February 25, 1927	University of Wyoming	Laramie, Wyoming	Active	(Note: Chapter formed from Gamma Zeta, established in 1921.)
**Gamma Pi**	June 2, 1927	University of Alabama	Tuscaloosa, Alabama	Active	(Note: Chapter formed from Pi Alpha, established in 1922.)
**Gamma Rho**	February 13, 1888	Allegheny College	Meadville, Pennsylvania	Active	(Note: Chapter was originally called Rho (third), but was changed to Gamma Rho when the fraternity's naming conventions were changed in 1890.)
Gamma Sigma	June 25, 1928 – 1976	University of Manitoba	Winnipeg, Manitoba, Canada	Inactive	(Note: Chapter formed from Lambda Theta, established in 1925.)
Gamma Tau	May 3, 1929 – 1985	North Dakota State University	Fargo, North Dakota	Inactive	(Note: Chapter formed from Alpha Phi Beta, established in 1908.)
**Gamma Upsilon**	May 11, 1929	University of British Columbia	Vancouver, British Columbia, Canada	Active	(Note: Chapter formed from Delta Phi, established in 1919.)
**Gamma Phi**	May 17, 1929	Southern Methodist University	Dallas, Texas	Active	(Note: Chapter formed from Gamma Kappa, established in 1928.)
**Gamma Chi**	June 7, 1929	George Washington University	Washington, D.C.	Active	(Note: Chapter formed from Gamma Beta Pi, established in 1920.)
**Gamma Psi**	June 7, 1929 – May 20, 1992	University of Maryland, College Park	College Park, Maryland	Inactive	(Note: Chapter formed from Sigma Delta, established in 1920.)
**Gamma Omega**	December 6, 1929	Denison University	Granville, Ohio	Active	(Note: Chapter formed from Kappa Phi, established in 1898.)
**Delta Alpha**	October 3, 1930	Pennsylvania State University	State College, Pennsylvania	Active	(Note: Chapter formed from Sychor, established in 1922.)
**Delta Beta**	October 25, 1930	Duke University	Durham, North Carolina	Active	(Note: Chapter formed from Sigma Beta, established in 1928.)
**Delta Gamma**	November 7, 1930	Michigan State University	East Lansing, Michigan	Active	(Note: Chapter formed from Themian, established in 1898.)
**Delta Delta**	November 21, 1930	McGill University	Montreal, Quebec, Canada	Active	(Note: Chapter formed from Omicron Sigma Theta, established in 1926.)
Delta Epsilon	January 8, 1932 – April 11, 2022	Rollins College	Winter Park, Florida	Inactive	(Note: Chapter formed from Kappa Epsilon, established in 1902.)
Delta Zeta	November 4, 1932 – September 2020	Colorado College	Colorado Springs, Colorado	Inactive	(Note: Chapter formed from Hypatia, established in 1903. In 2020, the chapter withdrew and became a local sorority because it believed the national sorority was not doing enough to address the Black Lives Matter movement or the classist aspects of Greek life.)
**Delta Eta**	November 11, 1932	University of Utah	Salt Lake City, Utah	Active	(Note: Chapter formed from Lambda Phi Lambda, established in 1919.)
Delta Theta	September 22, 1933 – 1942	Goucher College	Baltimore, Maryland	Inactive	(Note: Chapter formed from Tau Kappa Phi, established in 1892.)
**Alpha Deuteron** (see Alpha)	October 13, 1934	Monmouth College	Monmouth, Illinois	Active	(Note: The former Alpha chapter was revived by absorbing Kappa Alpha Sigma, established in 1900.)
**Delta Iota**	December 6, 1935	Louisiana State University	Baton Rouge, Louisiana	Active	
Delta Kappa	November 18, 1938 – May 2018	University of Miami	Coral Gables, Florida	Inactive	(Note: Chapter formed from Lambda Phi, established in 1926. The sorority closed the chapter in 2018 because of low recruitment numbers over several years.)
**Delta Lambda**	November 9, 1940	Miami University	Oxford, Ohio	Active	
Delta Mu	December 4, 1942 – May 13, 2014	University of Connecticut	Storrs, Connecticut	Inactive	(Note: UConn banned the sorority chapter for five years for hazing in 2014.)
**Delta Nu**	December 12, 1942	University of Massachusetts Amherst	Amherst, Massachusetts	Active	(Note: Chapter formed from Sigma Beta Chi, established in 1931.)
**Delta Xi**	February 17, 1944	Carnegie Mellon University	Pittsburgh, Pennsylvania	Active	(Note: Chapter formed from Kappa Phi Delta, established in 1932.)
**Delta Omicron**	May 18, 1946	Iowa State University	Ames, Iowa	Active	
**Delta Pi**	November 2, 1946	University of Tulsa	Tulsa, Oklahoma	Active	(Note: Chapter formed from Alpha Pi Theta, established in 1945.)
**Delta Rho**	March 15, 1947	University of Mississippi	Oxford, Mississippi	Active	
**Delta Sigma**	April 12, 1947	Oklahoma State University	Stillwater, Oklahoma	Active	
**Delta Tau**	November 7, 1947	University of Southern California	Los Angeles, California	Active	
**Delta Upsilon**	February 14, 1948	University of Georgia	Athens, Georgia	Active	
**Delta Phi**	October 30, 1948	Bucknell University	Lewisburg, Pennsylvania	Active	(Note: Chapter formed from Alpha Sigma Alpha, established in 1946.)
Delta Chi	October 28, 1949 – January 26, 1972	San Jose State University	San Jose, California	Inactive	(Note: Chapter formed from Allenian Society, established in 1899.)
**Delta Psi**	March 27, 1953	Texas Tech University	Lubbock, Texas	Active	(Note: Chapter formed from Las Chaparratas, established in 1926.)
**Delta Omega**	November 5, 1954	California State University, Fresno	Fresno, California	Active	(Note: Chapter formed from Delta Kappa, established in 1917.)
**Epsilon Alpha**	April 12, 1955	Texas Christian University	Fort Worth, Texas	Active	
**Epsilon Beta**	March 10, 1956	Colorado State University	Fort Collins, Colorado	Active	
**Epsilon Gamma**	November 8, 1958 - May 2025	University of North Carolina at Chapel Hill	Chapel Hill, North Carolina	Inactive	
**Epsilon Delta**	April 24, 1959	Arizona State University	Tempe, Arizona	Active	
**Epsilon Epsilon**	May 9, 1959	Emory University	Atlanta, Georgia	Active	(Note: Chapter formed from Fleur-de-lis, established in 1955.)
**Epsilon Zeta**	December 9, 1961	Florida State University	Tallahassee, Florida	Active	
**Epsilon Eta**	March 23, 1963	Auburn University	Auburn, Alabama	Active	
Epsilon Theta	November 9, 1963 – 1981	University of Arkansas at Little Rock	Little Rock, Arkansas	Inactive	(Note: Chapter formed from Zeta Phi, established in 1943.)
Epsilon Iota	March 5, 1966 – December 7, 2004	University of Puget Sound	Tacoma, Washington	Inactive	
**Epsilon Kappa**	February 18, 1967	University of South Carolina	Columbia, South Carolina	Active	
**Epsilon Lambda**	February 25, 1967	University of Tennessee	Knoxville, Tennessee	Active	
**Epsilon Mu**	March 7, 1970	Clemson University	Clemson, South Carolina	Active	(Note: Chapter formed from Omicron Zeta Tau, established in 1960.)
**Epsilon Nu**	October 13, 1973	Vanderbilt University	Nashville, Tennessee	Active	(Note: Chapter formed from the Philean Society, established in 1972.)
**Epsilon Xi**	November 16, 1974	California State University, Northridge	Northridge, California	Active	
**Epsilon Omicron**	February 15, 1975	University of California, Davis	Davis, California	Active	
**Epsilon Pi**	February 7, 1976	University of California, Riverside	Riverside, California	Active	
**Beta Eta Deuteron** (see Beta Eta)	January 1, 1978	Stanford University	Stanford, California	Active	(Note: Revived Beta Eta chapter.)
**Epsilon Rho**	February 28, 1976	Texas A&M University	College Station, Texas	Active	
**Epsilon Sigma**	October 23, 1976	University of Virginia	Charlottesville, Virginia	Active	(Note: Chapter formed from Kappa Gamma, established in 1975.)
Epsilon Tau	April 16, 1977 – 1984	Mississippi State University	Starkville, Mississippi	Inactive	
**Psi Deuteron** (see Psi)	April 23, 1977	Cornell University	Ithaca, New York	Active	(Note: After going dormant, Psi chapter was revived as Psi Deuteron by Kappa Kappa Psi, established in 1969.)
**Epsilon Upsilon**	September 22, 1977	Baylor University	Waco, Texas	Active	(Note: Chapter formed from the Athenean Club, established in 1935.)
**Epsilon Phi**	March 4, 1978	University of Florida	Gainesville, Florida	Active	
**Epsilon Chi**	September 30, 1978	Dartmouth College	Hanover, New Hampshire	Active	
**Epsilon Psi**	October 14, 1978	University of California, Santa Barbara	Goleta, California	Active	
**Epsilon Omega**	March 10, 1979	Dickinson College	Carlisle, Pennsylvania	Active	
**Zeta Alpha**	February 16, 1980	Babson College	Wellesley, Massachusetts	Active	
**Zeta Beta**	April 26, 1980	Lafayette College	Easton, Pennsylvania	Active	(Note: Chapter formed from Gamma Tau Delta, established in 1978.)
**Zeta Gamma**	October 4, 1980	Centre College	Danville, Kentucky	Active	
Zeta Delta	October 18, 1980 – 1994	University of Vermont	Burlington, Vermont	Inactive	
**Zeta Epsilon**	October 24, 1981	Lawrence University	Appleton, Wisconsin	Active	
**Zeta Zeta**	February 20, 1982	Westminster College	Fulton, Missouri	Active	
Zeta Eta	April 3, 1982 – April 8, 2013	University of California, Irvine	Irvine, California	Inactive	
**Zeta Iota**	November 13, 1982	Villanova University	Villanova, Pennsylvania	Active	(Note: Chapter formed from Delta Kappa Nu, established in 1974.)
**Zeta Theta**	May 2, 1982	Trinity College	Hartford, Connecticut	Active	(Note: Chapter formed from Alpha Sigma Chi, established in 1981.)
**Zeta Kappa**	April 30, 1983	Bowling Green State University	Bowling Green, Ohio	Active	
**Zeta Lambda**	April 7, 1984	Washington & Jefferson College	Washington, Pennsylvania	Active	
**Zeta Mu**	November 16, 1985	Virginia Tech	Blacksburg, Virginia	Active	
**Zeta Nu**	November 23, 1985	University of California, San Diego	La Jolla, California	Active	
**Zeta Xi**	January 17, 1987	Yale University	New Haven, Connecticut	Active	
**Zeta Omicron**	May 2, 1987	University of Richmond	Richmond, Virginia	Active	
**Zeta Pi**	November 14, 1987	College of Idaho	Caldwell, Idaho	Active	(Note: Chapter formed from Kappa Lambda Chi.)
**Zeta Rho**	March 19, 1988	Colgate University	Hamilton, New York	Active	(Note: Chapter formed from Delta Sigma Upsilon, established in 1980.)
**Zeta Sigma**	April 22, 1989	University of North Texas	Denton, Texas	Active	(Note: Chapter formed from Kappa Theta Delta, established in 1986.)
**Omicron Deuteron** (see Omicron)	February 10, 1990	Simpson College	Indianola, Iowa	Active	(Note: This revived the Omicron chapter.)
**Zeta Tau**	May 1, 1989	Washington and Lee University	Lexington, Virginia	Active	
**Zeta Upsilon**	March 31, 1990 – 2005; 2007	Georgia Southern University	Statesboro, Georgia	Active	
**Zeta Phi**	April 11, 1992	Princeton University	Princeton, New Jersey	Active	
**Zeta Chi**	November 20, 1993	Marist University	Marist College, New York	Active	
**Zeta Psi**	December 4, 1993	Wake Forest University	Winston-Salem, North Carolina	Active	(Note: Chapter formed from S.O.P.H., established in 1956.)
**Zeta Omega**	January 8, 1994	University of Waterloo	Waterloo, Ontario, Canada	Active	(Note: Chapter formed from Kappa Phi Gamma, established in 1986.)
Eta Alpha	March 19, 1994 – April 2022	Furman University	Greenville, South Carolina	Inactive	(Note: Chapter formed from the Kappa Society, established in 1993. It closed in 2022 due to low membership.)
**Eta Beta**	October 5, 1996	Pepperdine University	Malibu, California	Active	(Note: Chapter formed from Zeta Kappa, established in 1938.)
**Eta Gamma**	October 24, 1997	University of San Diego	San Diego, California	Active	
**Eta Delta**	April 18, 1998	Valparaiso University	Valparaiso, Indiana	Active	(Note: Chapter formed from Phi Beta Chi, established in 1956.)
**Eta Epsilon**	October 23, 1999	Johns Hopkins University	Baltimore, Maryland	Active	
**Eta Zeta**	November 17, 2001	John Carroll University	Cleveland, Ohio	Active	(Note: Chapter formed from Kappa Delta Gamma, established in 1988.)
**Eta Eta**	November 23, 2002	University of Central Florida	Orlando, Florida	Active	
Eta Theta	November 15, 2003 – 2018	Harvard University	Cambridge, Massachusetts	Inactive	(Note: The chapter closed after Harvard instituted restrictions on members of single-gender social organizations.)
**Eta Iota**	April 2, 2005	Creighton University	Omaha, Nebraska	Active	
**Eta Kappa**	March 4, 2007	Knox College	Galesburg, Illinois	Active	(Note: Chapter formed from Tau Sigma Omega, established in 2005.)
**Eta Lambda**	March 31, 2007	Loyola University Chicago	Chicago, Illinois	Active	(Note: Chapter formed from Kappa Beta Gamma, established in 1954.)
**Eta Mu**	April 29, 2007	University of California, Santa Cruz	Santa Cruz, California	Active	(Note: Chapter formed from Alpha Sigma Delta, established in 2006.)
**Eta Nu**	January 10, 2009	Santa Clara University	Santa Clara, California	Active	
**Eta Xi**	April 25, 2009	University of California, Merced	Merced, California	Active	
**Eta Omicron**	March 27, 2010	Northeastern University	Boston, Massachusetts	Active	
**Eta Pi**	November 5, 2011	New York University	New York City, New York	Active	(Note: Chapter formed from Kappa Psi Delta, established in 1998.)
**Eta Rho**	March 2, 2013	California Polytechnic State University, San Luis Obispo	San Luis Obispo, California	Active	
**Eta Sigma**	April 20, 2013	Chapman University	Orange, California	Active	
**Eta Tau**	October 26, 2013	Georgetown University	Washington, D.C.	Active	
**Eta Upsilon**	November 16, 2013	Wichita State University	Wichita, Kansas	Active	(Note: Chapter formed from Gamma Epsilon, established in 2009.)
**Eta Phi**	November 23, 2013	Elmhurst University	Elmhurst, Illinois	Active	
**Eta Chi**	November 12, 2016	North Carolina State University	Raleigh, North Carolina	Active	
Eta Psi	November 18, 2017 – 2022	Pfeiffer University	Misenheimer, North Carolina	Inactive	
**Eta Omega**	April 21, 2018	Binghamton University	Binghamton, New York	Active	
**Theta Alpha**	November 3, 2018	Southern Illinois University Edwardsville	Edwardsville, Illinois	Active	
**Theta Beta**	December 1, 2018	Illinois State University	Normal, Illinois	Active	
**Theta Gamma**	December 2, 2018	LIU Post	Greenvale, New York	Active	
**Theta Delta**	September 12, 2020	Seton Hall University	South Orange, New Jersey	Active	

== Alumni initiate chapters ==
In the following list, active chapters are indicated in bold and inactive chapters are in italics.

Chapter	Charter date and range	Location	Status	Ref.
**Alpha Iota**	August 8, 2019	Dublin, Ohio	Active	

== See also ==
- List of Kappa Kappa Gamma members
