= Pierre Bornat =

French alpine skier

Pierre Bornat is a French alpine skier and sport official best known for taking the Judge's Oath at the 1992 Winter Olympics in Albertville.
