= Olympic Oath =

Oath sworn at the Olympic Games

The Olympic Oath (distinct from the Olympic creed) is a solemn promise made by one athlete, judge or official, and one coach at the Opening Ceremony of each Olympic Games. Each oath taker is from the host nation and takes the oath on behalf of all athletes, officials, or coaches at the Games. The athletes' oath was first introduced for the 1920 Summer Olympic Games, with oaths for the officials and coaches added in 1972 and 2010.

The inspiration for an oath came from the Ancient Olympic Games where competitors swore on a statue of Zeus. An oath for the athletes was first thought of in 1906, following unsportsmanlike incidents. An athletes' oath was introduced for the 1920 games and Victor Boin was the first person to take the oath on behalf of all athletes. Giuliana Minuzzo was the first woman to take the athletes' oath at the winter games in 1956, while Heidi Schuller did likewise at the Summer Olympics in 1972. The first Olympic Champion to take the oath was Rudolf Ismayr, who took it at the 1936 Games. The only occasion where more than one person has said an oath occurred at the 1988 Summer Olympics when Hur Jae and Shon Mi-Na took the athletes' oath together, until 2021 when rules around gender equality decreed that each oath would be taken by a man and a woman. The oath has changed over the years to remove nationalism and to reflect drugs in sport and equality.

An oath for the officials was first discussed in the 1950s. It was not, however, until 1970 that the International Olympic Committee (IOC) voted to include an oath of the officials as well as athletes at the Olympic Games. The first oath for the officials was taken by Fumio Asaki at the 1972 Winter Olympic Games. When the Youth Olympics were created the IOC decided to have an oath for coaches as they realised that young athletes look to them particularly. This was introduced into the adult games for the 2012 edition.

== History ==
An oath was an idea taken from the Ancient Olympic Games where competitors swore an oath beside a statue of Zeus. A call for an oath was announced as early as 1906 by International Olympic Committee (IOC) president and founder Pierre de Coubertin in the Revue Olympique (Olympic Review in French). This was done in an effort to ensure fairness and impartiality. The Olympic Oath was first taken at the 1920 Summer Olympics in Antwerp by the fencer Victor Boin. Boin's oath in 1920 was:

We swear. We will take part in the Olympic Games in a spirit of chivalry, for the honour of our country and for the glory of sport.

At a winter sports week in Chamonix in 1924, which were retrospectively called the Olympic Games in 1926, all the competitors took an Olympic style oath and were led by Camille Mandrillon. Rudolf Ismayr was the first Olympic Champion to take the oath, doing so at the 1936 Games in Berlin. In 1956 Giuliana Chenal-Minuzzo became the first woman to recite the oath.

In 1961, "swear" was replaced by "promise" and "the honour of our countries" by "the honour of our teams" in an effort to eliminate nationalism at the Olympic Games. Therefore the oath was as follows:

In the name of all competitors, I promise that we shall take part in these Olympic Games, respecting and abiding by the rules that govern them, in the true spirit of sportsmanship, for the glory of sport and the honour of our teams.

An oath for the officials had been discussed since the 1950s when the International Amateur Boxing Association asked all its officials to undertake an oath. In 1970 the IOC amended rule 57 of the charter and decreed that a judge from the host nation would also take an oath. The first judges' oath was taken at the 1972 Winter Olympics in Sapporo by Fumio Asaki and Heinz Pollay performed the task at that year's summer games in Munich.

The Munich games saw Heidi Schüller become the first female athlete to take the oath at the Summer Games; women had been competing at the games since 1900. At the 1988 Games the athletes' oath for the first time was undertaken by more than one person, when Hur Jae and Shon Mi-Na took the oath in unison.

All persons up until the 1980 Games swore the oath on their country's flag. However, in an attempt to eliminate nationalism from the oath ceremony, all have sworn on the Olympic Flag since the 1984 games. The oaths are usually spoken in the language of the host nation (or athlete's mother tongue – Bojan Krizaj represented Yugoslavia but spoke Slovenian), but in 1994 both of the oaths were conducted in English rather than Norwegian.

In 1999, the IOC created the World Anti-Doping Agency (WADA) in an effort to form a more organized battle against doping. Thus, the Athletes Oath was amended to include references to doping and drugs. In 2010 the IOC recognised that younger athletes, in particular, are influenced by their coaches. At the first Youth Olympic Games, coaches were also required to undertake an oath for this reason. With effect from the 2018 Winter Olympics, the three oaths were combined into one, led by an athlete, although representatives of judges and coaches are still involved in the taking of the oath. In July 2021 the oath was further refined to highlight inclusion and equality. The changes to the wording came from the IOC Athletes’ Commission. In addition the number of oath takers at each games were expanded from three to six, to ensure a member of each gender was represented in each oath as part of a commitment to promote women in sport at all levels and in all structures, as stated in the Olympic Charter.

=== Athletes' Oath ===
The chosen athlete, a representative of all the participating Olympic competitors, recited the following from 2000 until 2016:

In the name of all competitors, I promise that we shall take part in these Olympic Games, respecting and abiding by the rules which govern them, committing ourselves to a sport without doping and without drugs, in the true spirit of sportsmanship, for the glory of sport and the honor of our teams.

=== The Officials' Oath ===
The judge/official, also from the host nation, likewise held a corner of the flag and said the following:

In the name of all the judges and officials, I promise that we shall officiate in these Olympic Games with complete impartiality, respecting and abiding by the rules which govern them, in the true spirit of sportsmanship.

=== The Coaches' Oath ===
At the 2010 Summer Youth Olympics, an additional oath was taken by a coach; this was added to the protocol for the 2012 Games:

In the name of all the coaches and other members of the athletes' entourage, I promise that we shall commit ourselves to ensuring that the spirit of sportsmanship and fair play is fully adhered to and upheld in accordance with the fundamental principles of Olympism.

=== Unified Oath ===
Beginning in PyeongChang at the 2018 Winter Olympics, there was only one oath.

A representative for the athletes, judges, and coaches each recites the following lines respectively:

In the name of the athletes.
In the name of all judges.
In the name of all the coaches and officials.

The athletes' representative then completes the oath:

We promise to take part in these Olympic Games, respecting and abiding by the rules and in the spirit of fair play. We all commit ourselves to sport without doping and cheating. We do this, for the glory of sport, for the honour of our teams and in respect for the Fundamental Principles of Olympism.

=== Equality changes ===
In July 2021 the oath was updated to include elements around inclusion and equality. The oath from now on would be said by a man and a woman of each discipline.

The representatives for the athletes, judges, and coaches each recites the following lines respectively:

In the name of the athletes.
In the name of all judges.
In the name of all the coaches and officials.

The athletes' representative then completes the oath:

We promise to take part in these Olympic Games, respecting and abiding by the rules and in the spirit of fair play, inclusion and equality. Together we stand in solidarity and commit ourselves to sport without doping, without cheating, without any form of discrimination. We do this for the honour of our teams, in respect for the Fundamental Principles of Olympism, and to make the world a better place through sport.

== Speakers ==
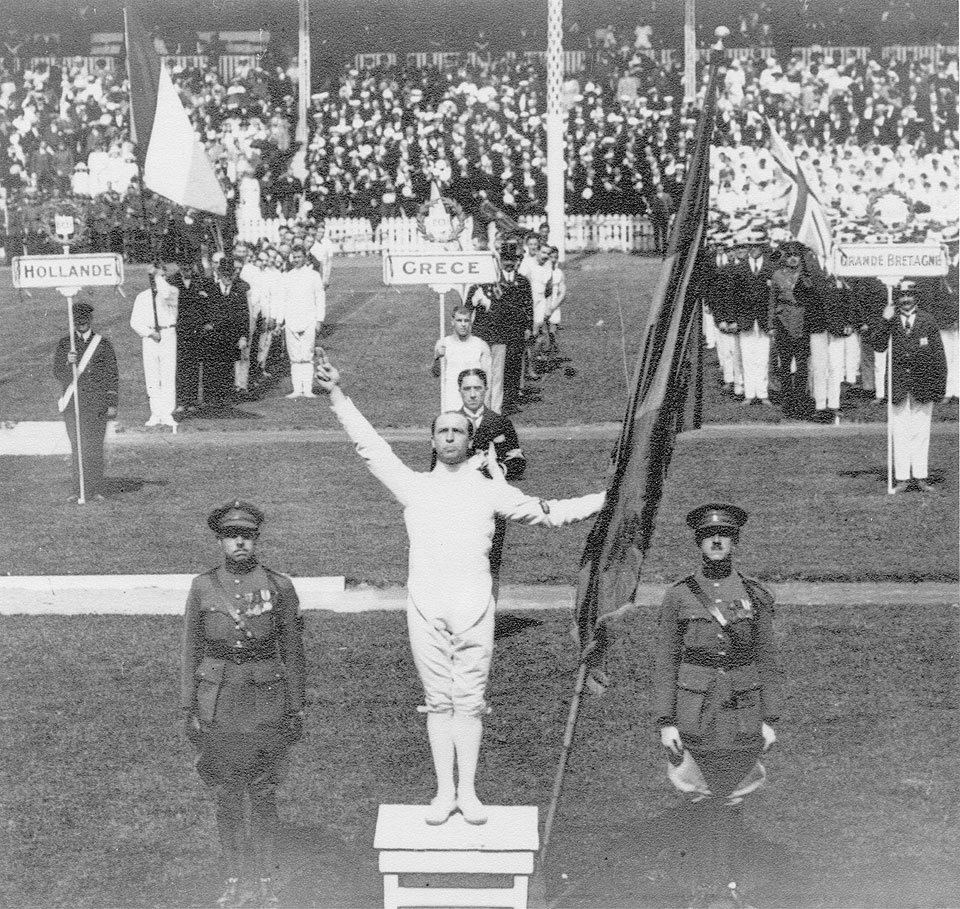
Victor Boin taking the first oath in Antwerp.

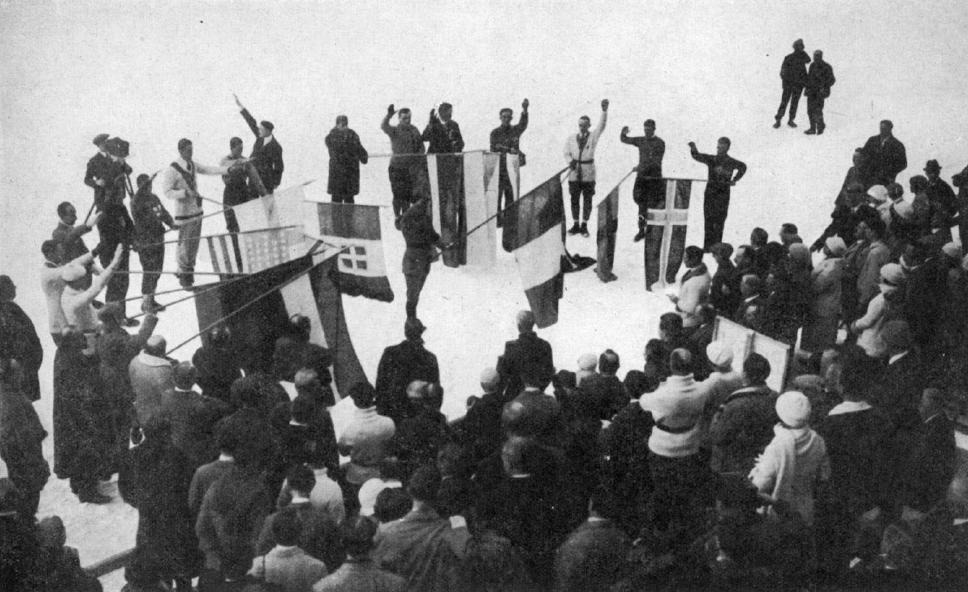
The oath being taken collectively at the first winter games in 1924 at Chamonix

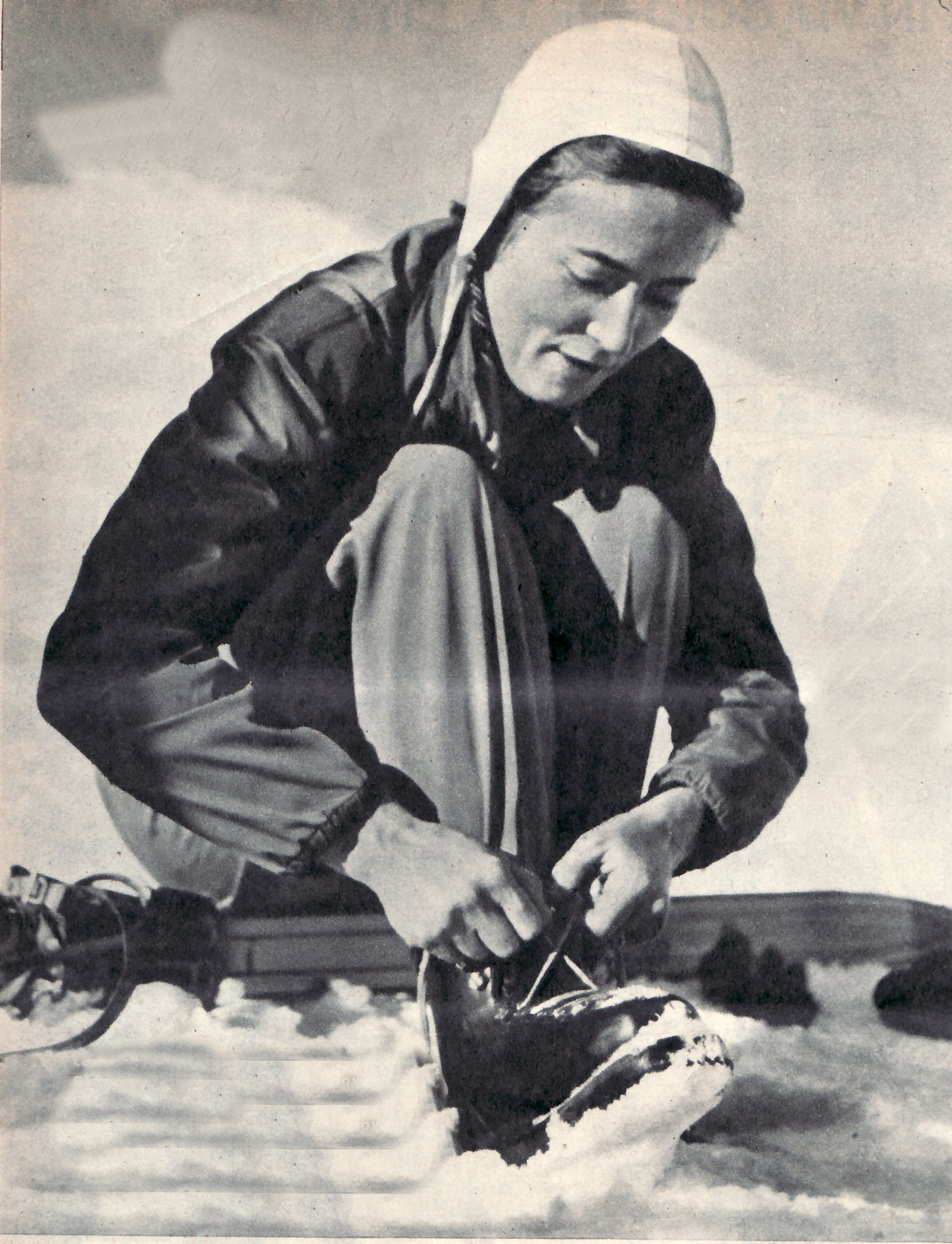
Minuzzo was the first woman to take the athletes oath at the winter games.

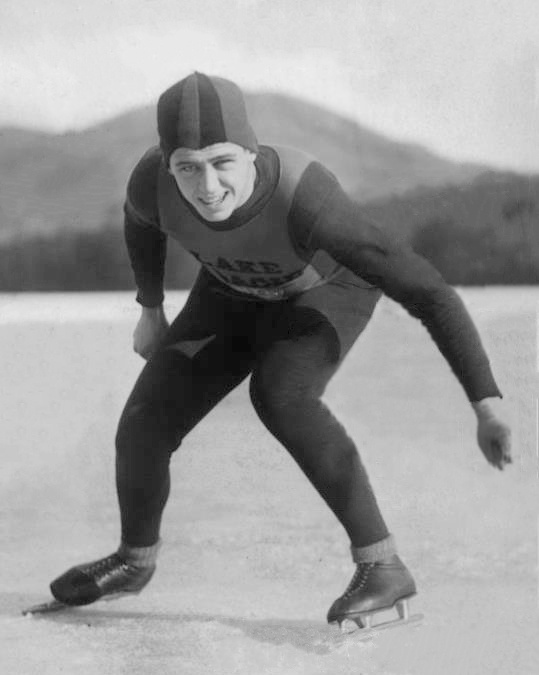
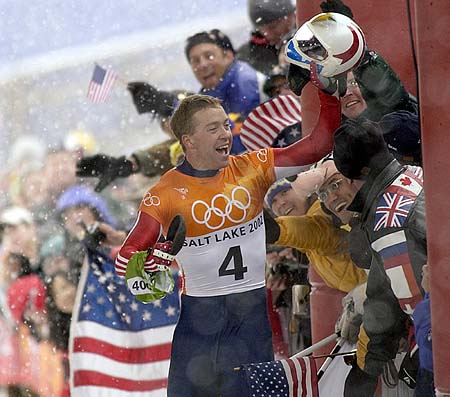
Jack Shea (l) took the athletes oath in 1932 and his grandson Jimmy Shea (r) did likewise in 2002.

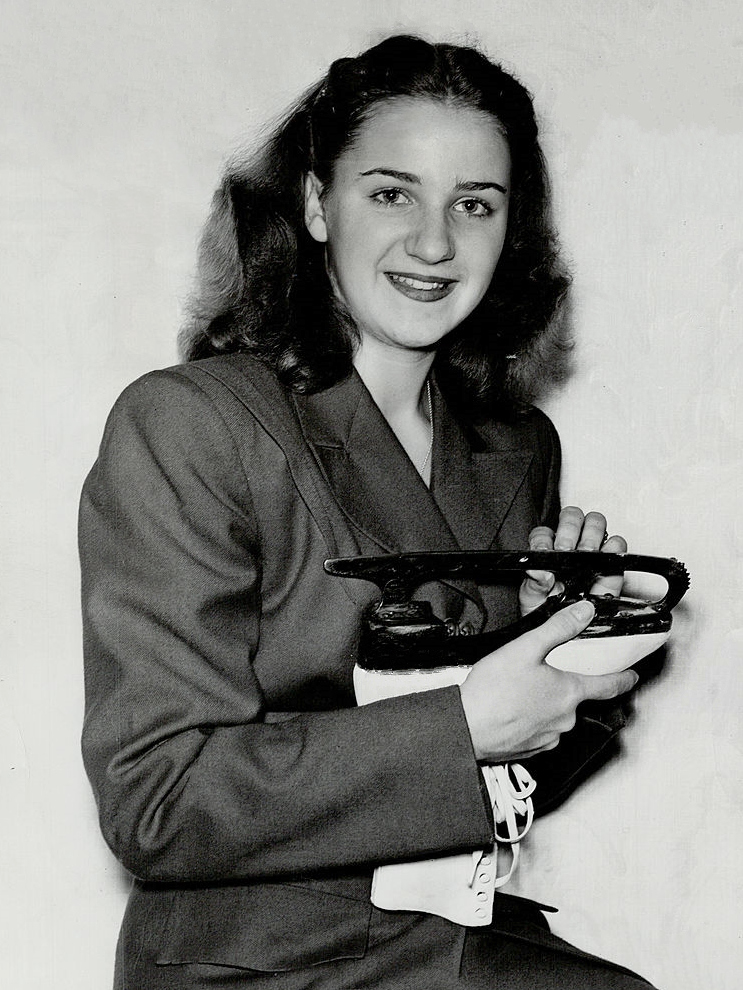
Suzanne Morrow-Francis was the first woman to take the official's oath at the winter games in 1988.

The athletes, judges and coaches that have delivered the Olympic Oath are listed below.

Olympic Oath
Olympics	Athlete	Sport	Judge (Official)	Coach	Reference
1920 Summer Olympics	Victor Boin	Swimming	-	-	
1924 Winter Olympics	Camille Mandrillon	Military patrol	-	-	
1924 Summer Olympics	Géo André	Athletics	-	-	
1928 Winter Olympics	Hans Eidenbenz	Nordic combined	-	-	
1928 Summer Olympics	Harry Dénis	Football	-	-	
1932 Winter Olympics	Jack Shea	Speed skating	-	-	
1932 Summer Olympics	George Calnan	Fencing	-	-	
1936 Winter Olympics	Willy Bogner, Sr.	Nordic combined	-	-	
1936 Summer Olympics	Rudolf Ismayr	Weightlifting	-	-	
1948 Winter Olympics	Bibi Torriani	Ice hockey	-	-	
1948 Summer Olympics	Donald Finlay	Athletics	-	-	
1952 Winter Olympics	Torbjørn Falkanger	Ski jumping	-	-	
1952 Summer Olympics	Heikki Savolainen	Gymnastics	-	-	
1956 Winter Olympics	Giuliana Minuzzo	Alpine skiing	-	-	
1956 Summer Olympics	John Landy (Melbourne); Henri Saint Cyr (Stockholm)	Athletics; Equestrian	-	-	
1960 Winter Olympics	Carol Heiss	Figure skating	-	-	
1960 Summer Olympics	Adolfo Consolini	Athletics	-	-	
1964 Winter Olympics	Paul Aste	Bobsleigh	-	-	
1964 Summer Olympics	Takashi Ono	Gymnastics	-	-	
1968 Winter Olympics	Léo Lacroix	Alpine skiing	-	-	
1968 Summer Olympics	Pablo Garrido	Athletics	-	-	
1972 Winter Olympics	Keiichi Suzuki	Speed skating	Fumio Asaki	-	
1972 Summer Olympics	Heidi Schüller	Athletics	Heinz Pollay	-	
1976 Winter Olympics	Werner Delle Karth	Bobsleigh	Willy Köstinger	-	
1976 Summer Olympics	Pierre St.-Jean	Weightlifting	Maurice Fauget	-	
1980 Winter Olympics	Eric Heiden	Speed skating	Terry McDermott	-	
1980 Summer Olympics	Nikolai Andrianov	Gymnastics	Alexander Medved	-	
1984 Winter Olympics	Bojan Križaj	Alpine skiing	Miodrag Perović	-	
1984 Summer Olympics	Edwin Moses	Athletics	Sharon Weber	-	
1988 Winter Olympics	Pierre Harvey	Cross-country skiing	Suzanna Morrow-Francis	-	
1988 Summer Olympics	Hur Jae; Shon Mi-Na	Basketball; Handball	Lee Hak-Rae	-	
1992 Winter Olympics	Surya Bonaly	Figure skating	Pierre Bornat	-	
1992 Summer Olympics	Luis Doreste Blanco	Sailing	Eugeni Asensio	-	
1994 Winter Olympics	Vegard Ulvang	Cross-country skiing	Kari Kåring	-	
1996 Summer Olympics	Teresa Edwards	Basketball	Hobie Billingsley	-	
1998 Winter Olympics	Kenji Ogiwara	Nordic combined	Junko Hiramatsu	-	
2000 Summer Olympics	Rechelle Hawkes	Field hockey	Peter Kerr	-	
2002 Winter Olympics	Jimmy Shea	Skeleton	Allen Church	-	
2004 Summer Olympics	Zoi Dimoschaki	Swimming	Lazaros Voreadis	-	
2006 Winter Olympics	Giorgio Rocca	Alpine skiing	Fabio Bianchetti	-	
2008 Summer Olympics	Zhang Yining	Table tennis	Huang Liping	-	
2010 Winter Olympics	Hayley Wickenheiser	Ice hockey	Michel Verrault	-	
2010 Summer Youth Olympics	Caroline Pei Jia Chew		Syed Abdul Kadir	David Lim	
2012 Winter Youth Olympics	Christina Ager		Peter Zenz	Angelika Neuner	
2012 Summer Olympics	Sarah Stevenson	Taekwondo	Mik Basi	Eric Farrell	
2014 Winter Olympics	Ruslan Zakharov	Short track and speed skating	Vyacheslav Vedenin, Jr.	Anastasia Popkova	
2014 Summer Youth Olympics	Fan Zhendong		Zhou Qiurui	Li Rongxiang	
2016 Winter Youth Olympics	Maria Ramsfjell Stabekk		Thomas Pettersen	Sandra Alise Lyngstand	
2016 Summer Olympics	Robert Scheidt	Sailing	Martinho Nobre	Adriana Santos	
2018 Winter Olympics	Mo Tae-bum	Speed skating	Kim Woo-sik	Park Ki-ho	
2018 Summer Youth Olympics	Teresa Romairone		Lorena McColl	Carlos Retegui	
2020 Winter Youth Olympics	Noah Bodenstein		Eric Catanio	Stefan Meienberg	
2020 Summer Olympics	Kasumi Ishikawa	Table tennis	Asumi Tsuzaki	Reika Utsugi	
2020 Summer Olympics	Ryota Yamagata	Athletics	Masato Kato	Kosei Inoue	
2022 Winter Olympics	Liu Jiayu	Snowboarding	Yongchun Tao	Ji Xiaoou	
2022 Winter Olympics	Wang Qiang	Cross-country skiing	Yongchun Tao	Ji Xiaoou	
2024 Summer Olympics	Florent Manaudou	Swimming	Melanie Tran	Christophe Massina	
2024 Summer Olympics	Mélina Robert-Michon	Athletics	Melanie Tran	Christophe Massina	
2026 Winter Olympics	Stefania Constantini	Curling	Raffaella Locatelli; Gabriele Toldo	Elizabetta Biavaschi; Maurizio Marchetto	
2026 Winter Olympics	Dominik Fischnaller	Luge	Raffaella Locatelli; Gabriele Toldo	Elizabetta Biavaschi; Maurizio Marchetto	
2026 Summer Youth Olympics					
2028 Summer Olympics					

== See also ==
- Olympic symbols
