= Allen Church =

American alpine skiing sports official (1928–2019)

Allen Church (June 15, 1928 – August 17, 2019) was an American alpine skiing sports official who took the Judge's Oath at the 2002 Winter Olympics in Salt Lake City. During those games, he was the Chief of Timing and Scoring.

In 2003, he received the Bud and Mary Little Award from the US Ski Team for his work with the Winter Olympics and the International Ski Federation. He received U.S. Ski & Snowboard's highest honor, the Julius Blegen Award, in May, 2015. Church resided in Albuquerque, New Mexico until his death on August 17, 2019.
