= Mik Basi =

British boxing referee

Amrik "Mik" Basi MBE (born 21 May 1966 in Forest Gate in east London) is a British boxing referee based at Fairbairn Boxing Club in Manor Park in the London Borough of Newham. He took the Olympic Oath during the 2012 Summer Olympics opening ceremony on behalf of officials. During the Games he acted as referee or judge in both men's and women's boxing, and officiated a total of 38 matches including refereeing the men's light heavyweight final, becoming the first British official to Referee a final. He received the AIBA award as the top boxing official at the tournament. In 2013, Mik won the best AIBA Referee & Judge award, in 2014 he won the best World Series Boxing Referee & Judge award and in 2015 he won the best AIBA Pro Boxing Referee & Judge award, an achievement unlikely ever to be repeated. In 2016, Mik acted as referee or judge in both men's and women's boxing at the 2016 Rio Olympics, becoming the first ever British referee/judge to officiate at two Olympic Games.

Mik was appointed a Member of the Order of the British Empire (MBE) in the 2019 Birthday Honours List.

== Personal life ==
Basi lives in Brentwood in Essex with his wife. He is the Chairman of Fairbairn Boxing Club. His son Jacob is a former national amateur boxing champion. Basi has a brother, Jumbo, who is also a boxing referee.
