= Maurice Fauget =

Canadian athletics official

Maurice Fauget was a Canadian athletics official best known for taking the Judge's Oath at the 1976 Summer Olympics in Montreal, Quebec, Canada.
