= Emily C. Gorman =

Sixth director of the United States Women's Army Corps

Emily Carla Gorman
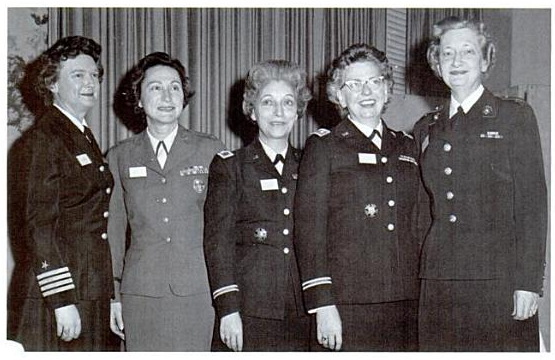
- From left to right: Viola B. Sanders, Elizabeth Ray, Emily C. Gorman, Mary E. Kelly, and Margaret M. Henderson after Kelly became the newly named deputy director of the Women's Army Corps on 3 January 1963.
- Born: April 9, 1909; New York
- Died: July 4, 2005 (aged 96); St. Petersburg, Florida
- Burial place: Pulaski, New York
- Education: Cornell University
- Military career
- Allegiance: United States
- Branch: Army
- Rank: Colonel
- Units: Director, Women's Army Corps
- Awards: Army Distinguished Service Medal

Colonel Emily C. Gorman (April 9, 1909 – July 4, 2005) was the sixth director of the United States Women's Army Corps (WAC) from 1962 to 1966. She was awarded the Distinguished Service Medal for her service during the Cold War.

== Early life and education ==
Emily C. Gorman was born in New York on April 9, 1909. She was valedictorian of her graduating high school class in Pulaski, New York, and she graduated from Cornell University in 1931. At Cornell, she was a member of the Kappa Kappa Gamma sorority. She worked as a teacher in New York until she enlisted in the Women's Army Corps in 1942.

Gorman graduated from the Women's Army Corps Officer Candidate School in October 1942. After graduating, she was appointed as chief of the School's administration school. In 1944, Gorman was appointed as the staff director for the Women's Army Corps surgeon general in Washington, D.C.

== Military career ==
=== World War II and early career ===
In August 1945, Gorman was assigned to Berlin, where she worked as executive security officer of the Allied Control Council. In February 1947, she was demobilized and returned to the states. Soon afterward, she was categorized as active duty and aided in the organization and planning of a new Women's Army Corps center. In 1948, Gorman became a training officer at Camp Lee.

Two years later, she was promoted to lieutenant colonel. She served as commander of the basic training battalion until 1951, when she re-joined the Women's Army Corps as staff adviser at Fort Meade. In 1954, Gorman also represented the Women's Army Corps on the Defense Advisory Committee for Women in Washington. Gorman worked as deputy director at Fort Meade until January 1957, when she became deputy chief of the Plans and Training Division at Fort Monroe.

=== Women's Army Corps and Vietnam war ===
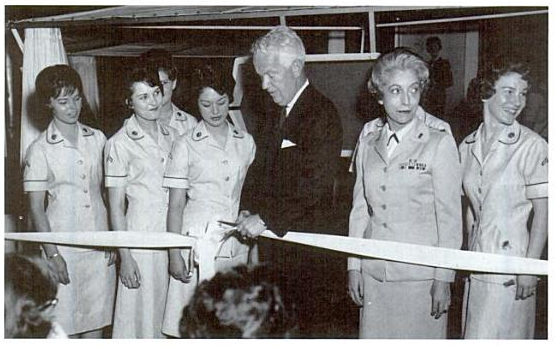
Under Secretary of the Army Stephen Ailes cuts the ribbon to open the WAC Exhibit Unit on The Pentagon concourse with Gorman and enlisted members of the newly formed WAC Exhibit Team.

In May 1962, President Kennedy received Gorman and the former WAC directors at the White House to publicly celebrate the 20th Anniversary of the Women's Army Corps.

Gorman was sworn in as WAC director and promoted to colonel on 1 August 1962 by new secretary of the Army, Cyrus R. Vance. In 1963, she chose Lt. Col. Mary E. Kelly as her deputy director. Gorman enrolled the Women's Army Corps in an exhibit program to increase public awareness of the Corps' functions. The exhibit was unveiled at the Pentagon on May 14, 1963. Gorman had assigned Lt. Col. Mildred I. C. Bailey as the head of the exhibit's planning team. The exhibit, "The Women's Army Corps–Serving with Pride and Dignity," toured the country for six and a half years.

In 1963, Gorman approved and enforced a new policy to increase the role of enlisted women in the U.S. Army. The plan included special dispensations for female soldiers based on the demands of currently enlisted women. These changes included increased security in living environments and designated living spaces accessible only by female personnel. Female personnel had also requested locks on the doors to their private dormitories, and Gorman's plan provided these. Through the policy, female soldiers were also permitted to decorate and personalize some areas of their living space. Between 1962 and 1966, reports showed that Gorman's policy had increased enlistment around 12%.

Gorman continued to push for improvements in housing for female personnel throughout the 1960s. In 1963, she adjusted some of her policy's plans for all-female housing, stating that female soldiers in some cases could live in gender-specific wings of male dorms, although they were ideally to be provided female-only entrances.

In 1964, Gorman selected American female soldiers to assist in the structuring of a Women's Armed Forces Corps in Vietnam. These women were assigned to support female Vietnamese soldiers in training and supporting a new infrastructure following the departure of American forces from the country.

In the last year of Gorman's career as director of the WAC, she pushed for military engineers to maximize living space in bathrooms, private bedrooms and kitchens for female personnel. In 1966, the Women's Army Corps held a groundbreaking ceremony for its newly designed barracks, and Gorman refused to attend, believing the engineers had not made adequate changes. Gorman retired from her position as director in July 1966.

== Post-military career ==
Upon her retirement, Gorman was awarded the Distinguished Service Medal for her military service during the Cold War. Over the course of her career, Gorman also received an Army Commendation Medal, a WAC Service Medal, American and European-African-Middle Eastern campaign medals, a World War II Victory Medal, an Army of Occupation Medal, a National Defense Medal and a General Staff Identification Badge.

After retiring from the military, Gorman worked at the Office of Economic Opportunity, aiding the implementation of programs against poverty.

Colonel Gorman died in 2005 at age 96. She is buried at Pulaski Village Cemetery in Pulaski, New York.

== Personal life ==
In 1962, Gorman received the Kappa Kappa Gamma Alumnae Achievement Award. She was a member of the American Association of University Women, the Business and Professional Women's Foundation, the National Association of Women Deans and Counselors, Robert Edwards American Legion Post 358, Monday Historical Club and Northern Oswego County Ambulance.
