= Neta Lohnes Frazier =

American writer

Neta Lohnes Frazier (1890–1990) was an American children's author best known for her books about the Pacific Northwest. She published 14 books between 1947 and 2015, including Stout-Hearted Seven, The Magic Ball, Secret Friend, My Love Is a Gypsy and Little Rhody.

She was a member of Kappa Kappa Gamma at Whitman College, Walla Walla, WA.
