= Fabio Bianchetti =

Italian figure skating official

Fabio Bianchetti is a member of the International Skating Union Technical Committee. He took the Judge's Oath at the 2006 Winter Olympics opening ceremony.

He is the son of Sonia Bianchetti, also a long-time former ISU official.
