= Sharon Weber =

American gymnastics judge

Sharon Weber is an American gymnastics official best known for taking the Judge's Oath at the 1984 Summer Olympics in Los Angeles. She was the first woman to take the judge's oath at the Olympic Games.

Weber was honored by the Fédération Internationale de Gymnastique (FIG - International Gymnastics Federation) as an honorary judge in January 2005 for her officiating work at all levels of gymnastics (US, World Championships, Summer Olympics).
