= Nancy Paterson (lawyer) =

American lawyer

Nancy Lou Paterson (April 25, 1953, Binghamton, New York – March 27, 2010, Bethesda, Maryland) was an international war crimes prosecutor, and a lead attorney in the United Nations' prosecution of Slobodan Milošević.

Prior to her U.N. commission, Paterson was a prosecutor for the Manhattan district attorney's office. She obtained a bachelor's degree from Miami University in Ohio, and her J.D. degree from Syracuse Law in the early 1980s.
