= Fumio Asaki =

Japanese ski jumping sports official

Fumio Asaki (浅木 文雄, Asaki Fumio) was a Japanese ski jumping sports official who was best known for taking the Judge's Oath at the 1972 Winter Olympics in Sapporo. Asaki was the first judge to do so in the Olympic Games.
