= Fumio Iwai =

Japanese diplomat

Fumio Iwai فوميو إيواي
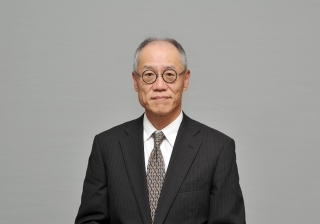

Ambassador to Saudi Arabia
- In office December 6, 2020 – Present

Ambassador to Iraq
- In office October 6, 2014 – July 17, 2018

Personal details
- Born: September 13, 1960 (age 65) Kyoto, Japan

Fumio Iwai (Japanese: 岩井文男) (born 17 July 1960), is a Japanese politician who currently serves as the ambassador of Japan to Saudi Arabia, and previously served as the Ambassador of Japan to Iraq.

== Diplomatic work ==
Fumio Iwai was appointed to the "Japanese Foreign Ministry" and served as:

- Ambassador of Japan to Iraq
- Ambassador of Japan to Saudi Arabia
