= Structure of the Common Security and Defence Policy =

European Union military structure

Coordinates: 50°50′43″N 4°23′25″E

This article outlines the present structure of the European Union's Common Security and Defence Policy (CSDP), a part of the Common Foreign and Security Policy (CFSP) based on articles 42–46 of the Treaty on European Union (TEU). Article 42.2 of TEU states that the CSDP includes the 'progressive framing' of a common Union defence policy, and will lead to a common defence, when the European Council of national heads of state or government, acting unanimously, so decides.

The CSDP involves military or civilian missions being deployed to preserve peace, prevent conflict and strengthen international security in accordance with the principles of the United Nations Charter. Military missions are carried out by EU forces established with contributions from the member states' armed forces. The CSDP also entails collective self-defence amongst member states (Note: The responsibility of collective self-defence within the CSDP is based on Article 42.7 of TEU, which states that this responsibility does not prejudice the specific character of the security and defence policy of certain member states, referring to policies of neutrality. See Neutral country§European Union for discussion on this subject.According to the Article 42.7 "If a Member State is the victim of armed aggression on its territory, the other Member States shall have towards it an obligation of aid and assistance by all the means in their power, in accordance with Article 51 of the United Nations Charter. This shall not prejudice the specific character of the security and defence policy of certain Member States." Article 42.2 furthermore specifies that NATO shall be the main forum for the implementation of collective self-defence for EU member states that are also NATO members.) as well as a Permanent Structured Cooperation (PESCO) in which 25 of the 28 national armed forces pursue structural integration. The CSDP structure, headed by the Union's High Representative (HR/VP), Kaja Kallas, comprises:

- the Defence Industry Directorate-General of the European Commission
- relevant sections of the External Action Service (EEAS) — including the Military Staff (EUMS) with its so-called Military Planning and Conduct Capability (MPCC)
- a number of Foreign Affairs Council (FAC) preparatory bodies — such as the Military Committee (EUMC)
- four agencies, including the Defence Agency (EDA)

The EU does not have a permanent military command structure along the lines of the North Atlantic Treaty Organization's (NATO) Allied Command Operations (ACO), although it has been agreed that ACO resources may be used for the conduct of the EU's CSDP missions. The MPCC, established in 2017 and to be strengthened in 2020, does however represent the EU's first step in developing a permanent military headquarters. In parallel, the newly established European Defence Fund (EDF) marks the first time the EU budget is used to finance multinational defence projects. The CSDP structure is sometimes referred to as the European Defence Union (EDU), especially in relation to its prospective development as the EU's defence arm. (Note: Akin to the EU’s banking union, economic and monetary union and customs union.)

Decisions relating to the CSDP are proposed by the HR/VP, adopted by the FAC, generally requiring unanimity, and then implemented by the HR/VP.

== Deployment procedure ==
Military operations may be launched after four planning phases, through which the Operation Commander (Op. Cdr.), Military Staff (EUMS), Military Committee (EUMC), Political and Security Committee (PSC) and Council have different roles:

I: Political Framework for Crisis Approach (PFCA)
II: Crisis Management Concept (CMC)
III: Military Strategic Options (MSO, unless within CMC) and Initiating Military Directive (IMD)
IV: Concept of Operations (CONOPS), Operations Plan (OPLAN) and Rules of Engagement (ROE)

== Overview ==
All military or civilian missions of the European Union (EU), as part of its Common Security and Defence Policy (CSDP), are planned and conducted by an operation headquarters (OHQ).

All civilian missions are directed by the Civilian Planning and Conduct Capability (CPCC), a directorate of the External Action Service (EEAS) in Brussels, Belgium.

For each military mission an OHQ is chosen. The EU does not have a permanent military command structure along the lines of the North Atlantic Treaty Organization's (NATO) Allied Command Operations (ACO), although it has been agreed that ACO resources may be used for the conduct of the EU's CSDP missions. The Military Planning and Conduct Capability (MPCC), established in 2017 and to be strengthened in 2020, does however represent the EU's first step in developing a permanent operational headquarters (OHQ).

The EU command and control (C2) structure is directed by political bodies composed of member states' representatives, and generally requires unanimous decisions. As of April 2019:

Liaison: Advice and recommendations Support and monitoring Preparatory work

Political strategic level:^{[5]}
ISS	EUCO Pres. (EUCO)	Chain of command
Coordination/support
SatCen	CIVCOM	HR/VP (FAC)
INTCEN	HR/VP (PMG)	HR/VP (PSC)^{[6]}	CEUMC (EUMC)
CMPD	DGEUMS^{[3]} (EUMS)
Military/civilian strategic level:
Dir MPCC^{[3]} (MPCC)	JSCC	Civ OpCdr CPCC^{[1]}
Operational level:
MFCdr^{[4]} (MFHQ)	HoM^{[1]}
Tactical level:
CC^{[2]}Air; CC^{[2]} Land; CC^{[2]} Mar; Other CCs^{[2]} European Armed Forces

^{1} In the event of a CSDP Civilian Mission also being in the field, the relations with the Civilian Planning and Conduct Capability (CPCC) and its Civilian Operation Commander (Civ OpCdr), as well as the subordinate Head of Mission (HoM), are coordinated as shown.

^{2} Other Component Commanders (CCs) and service branches which may be established.

^{3} The MPCC is part of the EUMS and Dir MPCC is double-hatted as DGEUMS. Unless the MPCC is used as Operation Headquarters (OHQ), either a national OHQ offered by member states or the NATO Command Structure (NCS) would serve this purpose. In the latter instance, Deputy Supreme Allied Commander Europe (DSACEUR), rather than Dir MPCC, would serve as Operation Commander (OpCdr).

^{4} Unless the MPCC is used as Operation Headquarters (OHQ), the MFCdr would be known as a Force Commander (FCdr), and direct a Force Headquarters (FHQ) rather than a MFHQ. Whereas the MFHQ would act both on the operational and tactical level, the FHQ would act purely on the operational level.

^{5} The political strategic level is not part of the C2 structure per se, but represents the political bodies, with associated support facilities, that determine the missions' general direction. The Council determines the role of the High Representative (HR/VP), who serves as Vice-President of the European Commission, attends European Council meetings, chairs the Foreign Affairs Council (FAC) and may chair the Political and Security Committee (PSC) in times of crisis. The HR/VP proposes and implements CSDP decisions.

^{6} Same composition as Committee of Permanent Representatives (COREPER) II, which also prepares for the CSDP-related work of the FAC.

== Bodies and political leadership ==
=== High Representative ===
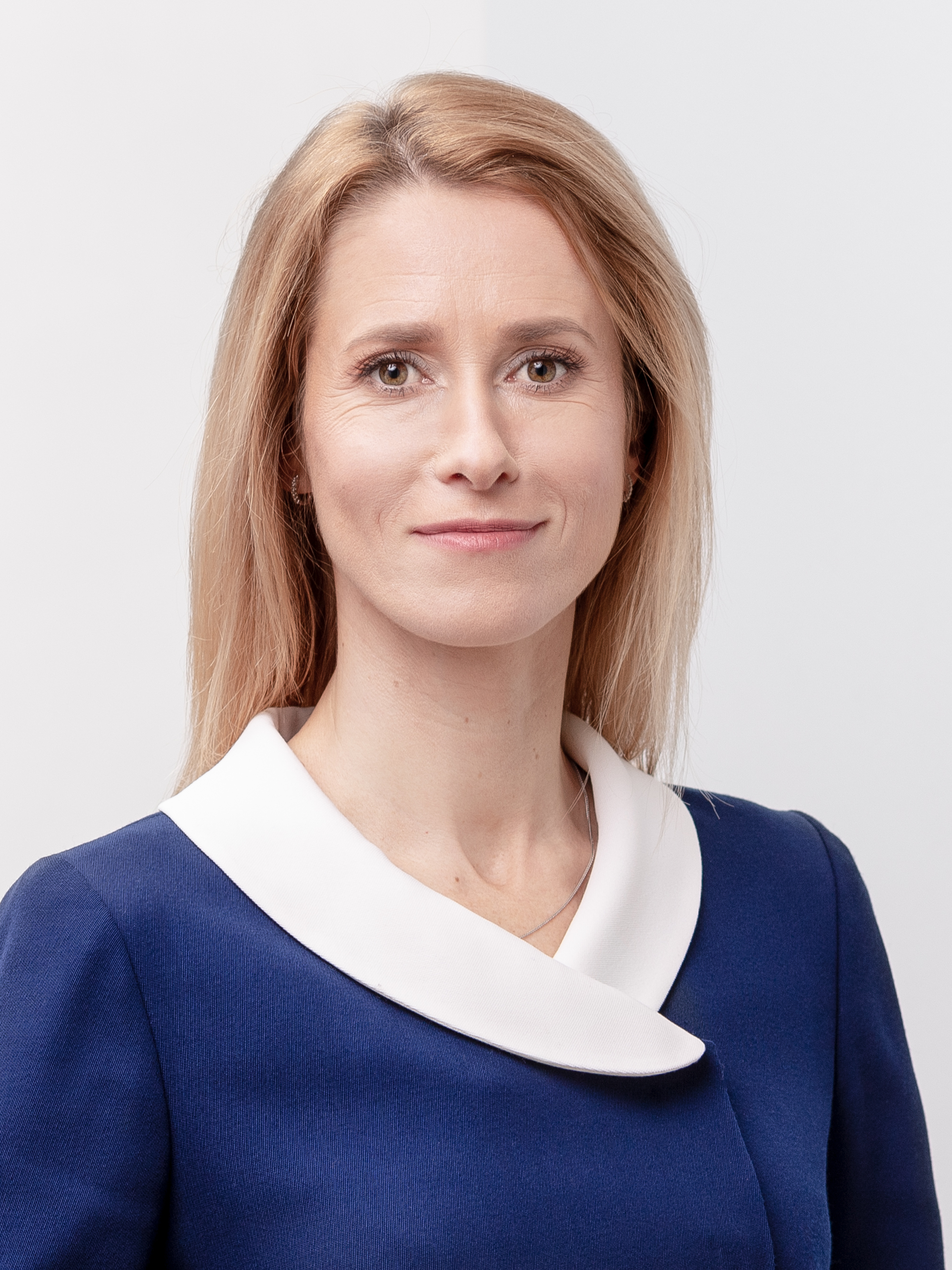
High Representative Kaja Kallas

The High Representative of the Union for Foreign Affairs and Security Policy, commonly referred to as the High Representative (HR/VP), is the chief co-ordinator and representative of the EU's Common Foreign and Security Policy (CFSP), including the CSDP. The position is currently held by Kaja Kallas.

Where foreign matters is agreed between EU member states, the High Representative can speak for the EU in that area, such as negotiating on behalf of the member states.

Beside representing the EU at international fora and co-ordinating the CFSP and the CSDP, the HR/VP is:

- ex-officio Vice-President of the European Commission
- participant in the meetings of the European Council
- responsible of the European Union Special Representatives
- head of the External Action Service and the delegations
- President of the Foreign Affairs Council
- Head of the European Defence Agency
- Chairperson of the board of the European Union Institute for Security Studies

=== European Commission ===
- Directorate-General for Defence Industry and Space, established in 2019

=== External Action Service ===
The European External Action Service (EEAS) is the diplomatic service and foreign and defence ministry of the EU. The EEAS is led by the HR/VP and seated in Brussels.

The EEAS does not propose or implement policy in its own name, but prepares acts to be adopted by the HR/VP, the European Commission or the Council. The EEAS is also in charge of EU diplomatic missions (delegations) and intelligence and crisis management structures.

The following EEAS bodies take part in managing the CSDP:

- The Military Staff (EUMS) is an EEAS Directorate-General that provides strategic advice to the HR/VP and commands military operations through its Military Planning and Conduct Capability (MPCC) operational headquarters. The EUMS also reports to the European Union Military Committee (EUMC), representing member states' Chiefs of Defence, and performs "early warning", situation assessment and strategic planning. The EUMS currently consists of 200+ military and civilian personnel. The EUMS and the European Defence Agency (EDA) together form the Secretariat of the Permanent Structured Cooperation (PESCO), the structural integration pursued by 26 of the 27 national armed forces of the EU since 2017.
- The Intelligence and Situation Centre (EU INTCEN)
- The Security and Defence College (ESDC) is a virtual institution for strategic level training. The ESDC consists of a network of various national institutions, such as defence colleges, and the European Union Institute for Security Studies. The ESDC initiated the European initiative for the exchange of young officers inspired by Erasmus, often referred to as military Erasmus, exchanging between armed forces of future military officers as well as their teachers and instructors during their initial education and training. Due to the fact that the initiative is implemented by the Member States on a purely voluntary basis, their autonomy with regard to military training is not compromised.
- The Crisis Management and Planning Directorate (CMPD)
- The Civilian Planning and Conduct Capability (CPCC)
- The Joint Support Coordination Cell (JSCC)

The relationship between the High Representative, the Military Staff and Military Committee as of November 2017: Colour key:
High Representative (a Vice-President of the Commission)
Military Committee (EUMC; a Council body)
Military Staff (EUMS; a Directorate-General of the External Action Service)

High Representative
Chairman EUMC
Working Group
Working Group/Headline Goal Task Force	Director General EUMS/ Director MPCC
Legal advisor	Deputy Director General	Horizontal Coordination
Assistant Chief of Staff for Synchronisation	EU cell at SHAPE	EU Liaison at the UN in NY	Assistant Chief of Staff for External Relations	NATO Permanent Liaison Team
Concepts & Capabilities; Directorate	Intelligence; Directorate	Operations; Directorate	Logistics; Directorate	Communications & Information Systems; Directorate	Military Planning and Conduct Capability (MPCC) Chief of Staff Working Group Current Operations

=== Council ===
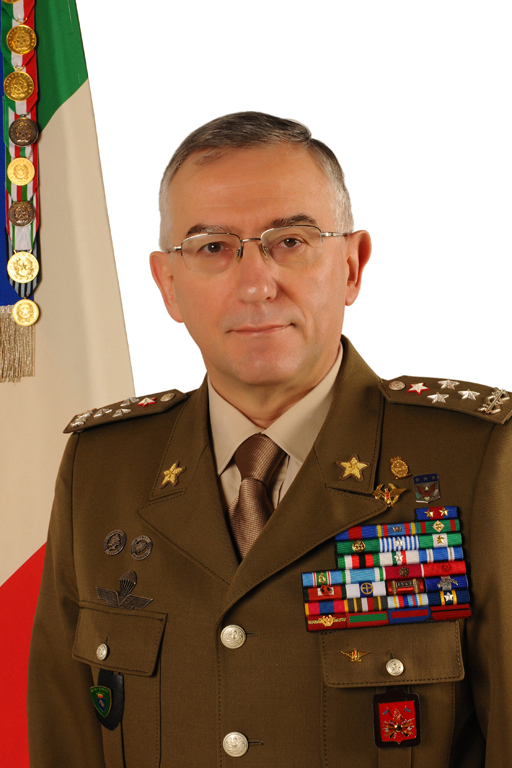
General Graziano has served as Chairman of the Military Committee since 2018

The Council of the European Union has the following, Brussels-based preparatory bodies in the field of CSDP:

- The Political and Security Committee (PSC) consists of ambassadorial level representatives from the EU member states and usually meets twice per week. The PSC is chaired by the External Action Service. Ambassador Walter Stevens has been the PSC permanent chair since June 2013 The main functions of the PSC are keeping track of the international situation, and helping to define EU policies within the CFSP and CSDP. PSC sends guidance to, and receives advice from the European Union Military Committee (EUMC), the Committee for Civilian Aspects of Crisis Management (CIVCOM) as well as the European Union Institute for Security Studies. It is also a forum for dialogue on CSDP matters between the EU Member States. PSC also drafts opinions for the Foreign Affairs Council, which is one of the configurations of the Council of the European Union. CFSP matters are passed to the Foreign Affairs Council via COREPER II.
- The European Union Military Committee (EUMC) is composed of member states' Chiefs of Defence (CHOD). These national CHODs are regularly represented in the EUMC in Brussels by their permanent Military Representatives (MilRep), who often are two- or three-star flag officers. The EUMC is under the under authority of the EU's High Representative (HR) and the Political and Security Committee (PSC). The EUMC gives military advice to the EU's High Representative (HR) and Political and Security Committee (PSC). The EUMC also oversees the European Union Military Staff (EUMS).
- The Committee for Civilian Aspects of Crisis Management (CIVCOM) is an advisory body dealing with civilian aspects of crisis management. The activities of CIVCOM therefore forms part of the Common Foreign and Security Policy (CFSP) of EU, and the civilian side of the Common Security and Defence Policy (CSDP). CIVCOM is composed of representatives of the EU member states. The activities of CIVCOM for civilian CSDP tasks occur in parallel to the European Union Military Committee (EUMC) for military CDP tasks. Both EUMC and CIVCOM receive directions from, and report to the Political and Security Committee (PSC). The decision to establish CIVCOM was taken in 2000 by the Council of the European Union.
- The Politico-Military Group (PMG) carries out preparatory work for the Political and Security Committee (PSC). It covers the political aspects of EU military and civil-military issues, including concepts, capabilities and operations and missions. The tasks of the PMG include: 1) preparing Council conclusions and provides recommendations for the PSC, and monitoring their effective implementation 2) contributing to the development of horizontal policy and facilitating information exchanges. The PMG has a particular responsibility regarding partnerships with non-EU countries and other organisations, including EU-NATO relations, as well as exercises. The PMG is chaired by a representative of the HR/VP.

=== Agencies ===
Location of decentralised CSDP agencies in addition to the Brussels-based External Action Service (EEAS), Defence Agency (EDA) and Council

The following agencies relate to the CSDP:

- The Defence Agency (EDA), based in Brussels, facilitates the improvement of national military capabilities and integration. In that capacity, it makes proposals, coordinates, stimulates collaboration, and runs projects.
- The Border and Coast Guard Agency (Frontex), based in Warsaw, Poland, leads the European coast guard that controls the borders of the Schengen Area.
- The Institute for Security Studies (ISS), based in Paris, is an autonomous think tank that researches EU-relevant security issues. The research results are published in papers, books, reports, policy briefs, analyses and newsletters. In addition, the institute convenes seminars and conferences on relevant issues that bring together EU officials, national experts, decision-makers and NGO representatives from all Member States.
- The Satellite Centre (SatCen), located in Torrejón de Ardoz, Spain, supports the decision-making by providing products and services resulting from the exploitation of relevant space assets and collateral data, including satellite and aerial imagery, and related services.

== Permanent structured cooperation ==
The Permanent Structured Cooperation (PESCO) is the framework in which 26 of the 27 national armed forces pursue structural integration. Based on Article 42.6 and Protocol 10 of the Treaty on European Union, introduced by the Treaty of Lisbon in 2009, PESCO was first initiated in 2017. The initial integration within the PESCO format is a number of projects planned to launch in 2018.

PESCO is similar to enhanced co-operation in other policy areas, in the sense that integration does not require that all EU member states participate.

== Defence industry coordination and research funding ==
The European Defence Fund is an EU-managed fund for coordinating and increasing national investment in defence research and improve interoperability between national forces. It was proposed in 2016 by President Jean-Claude Juncker and established in 2017 to a value of €5.5 billion per year. The fund has two stands; research (€90 million until the end of 2019 and €500 million per year after 2020) and development & acquisition (€500 million in total for 2019–20 then €1 billion per year after 2020).

Together with the Coordinated Annual Review on Defence and Permanent Structured Cooperation it forms a new comprehensive defence package for the EU.

EU-developed infrastructure for military use includes:

- European Secure Software-defined Radio
- Galileo (satellite navigation)

== See also ==
- Structure of NATO
