= Kortenberg building =

European Union office building in Brussels, Belgium

- French: Cortenbergh
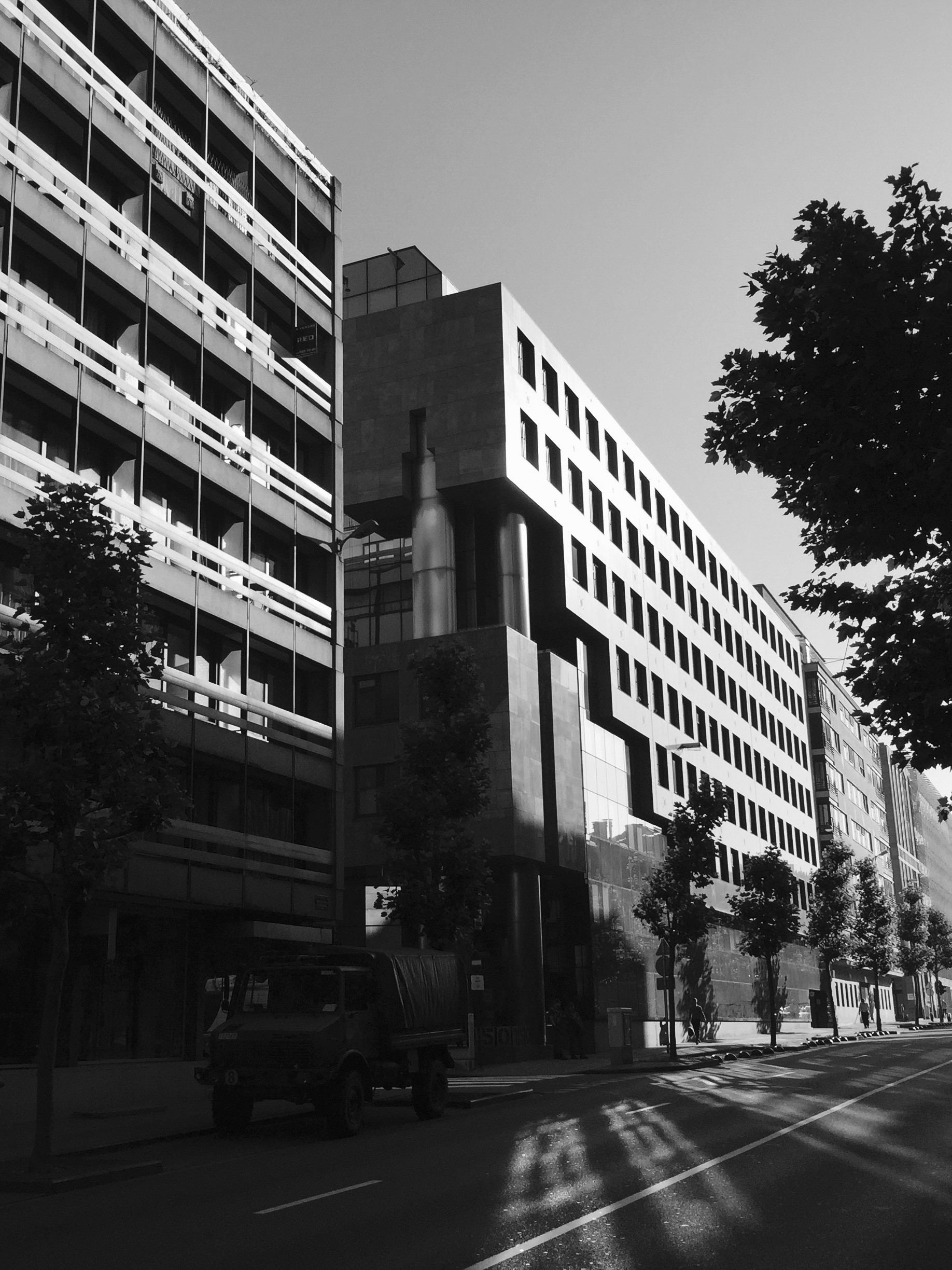
- Interactive map of the Kortenberg building area

General information
- Type: Office building
- Architectural style: Postmodern
- Location: Avenue de Cortenbergh / Kortenberglaan 150, 1040 City of Brussels, Brussels-Capital Region, Belgium
- Coordinates: 50°50′43″N 4°23′24.5″E
- Current tenants: Common Security and Defence Policy (CSDP) bodies of the Council of the European Union and European External Action Service

The Kortenberg building is an office building of the European Union (EU) in Brussels, Belgium. It houses mostly bodies related to the Common Security and Defence Policy (CSDP).

== History ==
The building was constructed in 1977 for an insurance company. That use of the building started after the establishment of the European Security and Defence Policy (ESDP), the precursor of the Common Security and Defence Policy, in the early 2000s under the auspices of High Representative Javier Solana, who stated on several occasions the need to build a "strong in-house strategic culture". Before, during the decade of the 90s and the late 80s, the building was used by the DG IV of the European Commission (Competition).

Most of the newly-established European External Action Service (EEAS) has been in the Triangle building, at the Robert Schuman Roundabout, since 2012, but for security reasons, CSDP departments have been unable to move to the building, which is 500 m (1,600 ft) away.

== Architecture ==
The postmodern L-shaped building was designed by the architectural firm ARCHI + I. It is located at the corner of the Rue Le Titien/Titiaanstraat. Towards the Avenue de Cortenbergh/Kortenberglaan, there are eight floors, the last of which is set back; towards the Rue Le Titien, four floors are surmounted by the glass roof of the auditorium. Windows with aluminum frames forming a glass base on the first two levels; then going up level by level in a staircase to reach the top of the building on the Rue Le Titien side; the glass roof then describes a slope up to the height of the neighboring houses.

The rest of the façades are in red Indian granite: granite of the base and the blind bay towards the Rue Le Titien unpolished; disc patterns under the unpolished windows also. Entrance of modest size between two colossal stainless steel columns rising to the full height of the building and appearing to cross the granite blocks. Rear façade alternating bands of red and brown bricks.

The interior consists of modest offices around central corridors and an indoor garden.

== CSDP tenants ==
Part of the European External Action Service (EEAS):

- European Union Military Staff (EUMS), including its Military Planning and Conduct Capability (MPCC)
- Civilian Planning and Conduct Capability (CPCC)
- Joint Support Coordination Cell (JSCC)
- Crisis Management and Planning Directorate (CMPD)

CSDP agencies outside the EEAS:

- European Defence Agency (EDA)
- European Union Satellite Centre (SatCen)

The MPCC, the JSCC and the CPCC together form the permanent military and civilian strategic level facilities in the EU command-and-control structure.

The EU command and control (C2) structure is directed by political bodies composed of member states' representatives, and generally requires unanimous decisions. As of April 2019:

Liaison: Advice and recommendations Support and monitoring Preparatory work

Political strategic level:^{[5]}
ISS	EUCO Pres. (EUCO)	Chain of command
Coordination/support
SatCen	CIVCOM	HR/VP (FAC)
INTCEN	HR/VP (PMG)	HR/VP (PSC)^{[6]}	CEUMC (EUMC)
CMPD	DGEUMS^{[3]} (EUMS)
Military/civilian strategic level:
Dir MPCC^{[3]} (MPCC)	JSCC	Civ OpCdr CPCC^{[1]}
Operational level:
MFCdr^{[4]} (MFHQ)	HoM^{[1]}
Tactical level:
CC^{[2]}Air; CC^{[2]} Land; CC^{[2]} Mar; Other CCs^{[2]} European Armed Forces

^{1} In the event of a CSDP Civilian Mission also being in the field, the relations with the Civilian Planning and Conduct Capability (CPCC) and its Civilian Operation Commander (Civ OpCdr), as well as the subordinate Head of Mission (HoM), are coordinated as shown.

^{2} Other Component Commanders (CCs) and service branches which may be established.

^{3} The MPCC is part of the EUMS and Dir MPCC is double-hatted as DGEUMS. Unless the MPCC is used as Operation Headquarters (OHQ), either a national OHQ offered by member states or the NATO Command Structure (NCS) would serve this purpose. In the latter instance, Deputy Supreme Allied Commander Europe (DSACEUR), rather than Dir MPCC, would serve as Operation Commander (OpCdr).

^{4} Unless the MPCC is used as Operation Headquarters (OHQ), the MFCdr would be known as a Force Commander (FCdr), and direct a Force Headquarters (FHQ) rather than a MFHQ. Whereas the MFHQ would act both on the operational and tactical level, the FHQ would act purely on the operational level.

^{5} The political strategic level is not part of the C2 structure per se, but represents the political bodies, with associated support facilities, that determine the missions' general direction. The Council determines the role of the High Representative (HR/VP), who serves as Vice-President of the European Commission, attends European Council meetings, chairs the Foreign Affairs Council (FAC) and may chair the Political and Security Committee (PSC) in times of crisis. The HR/VP proposes and implements CSDP decisions.

^{6} Same composition as Committee of Permanent Representatives (COREPER) II, which also prepares for the CSDP-related work of the FAC.

== See also ==
- Triangle building, the nearby main seat of the European External Action Service
- Brussels and the European Union
