= European Union Military Assistance Mission in support of Ukraine =

Active military training mission of the European Union

European Union Military Assistance Mission in support of Ukraine (EUMAM Ukraine)
- Other name: EUMAM UA
- Founder: Council of the EU (Note: abbr. EUCO, Council Decision (CFSP) 2022/2243, following a unanimous decision among EU member states to structure and coordinate efforts to train Ukrainian military personnel outside Ukraine’s territory. On 8 November 2024, the Council adopted a decision extending the mandate of the mission for a further two years, until 15 November 2026, with a budget allocation of nearly €409 million for the period from 14 November 2024 to 15 November 2026.)
- Founding leader: EUMS (with MPCC) (Note: European Union military staff and Military Planning and Conduct Capability respectively) as EU OHQ
- Military leader: Director of MPCC
- Political leader: CEUMC
- COM EUMAM UA / Dir MPCC /DGEUMS ('trial hat'): (first) VA Hervé Bléjean; LTG Michiel van der Laan, since JUN'23
- Mission type: Army operational level
- Founded: September 30, 2022 (as requested by Ukraine)
- Dates active: October 17, 2022- pr.
- Country: (recipient) Ukraine
- Allegiance: European Union
- Headquarters: Kortenberg building, BE-BRU 50.8453°N 4.3901°E
- Active regions: EU members territory
- Status: Multinational, active
- Size: HHC-equivalent (Note: Around 100 soldiers from 17 nations, including permanent Ukrainian representatives, in Germany command only.)
- Part of: European Peace Facility
- Website: Official website
Outline Since NOV 30, 2022, IOC abbr. EUMAM UA
- Military, security assistance to Ukraine; Part of ongoing Russian invasion of Ukraine
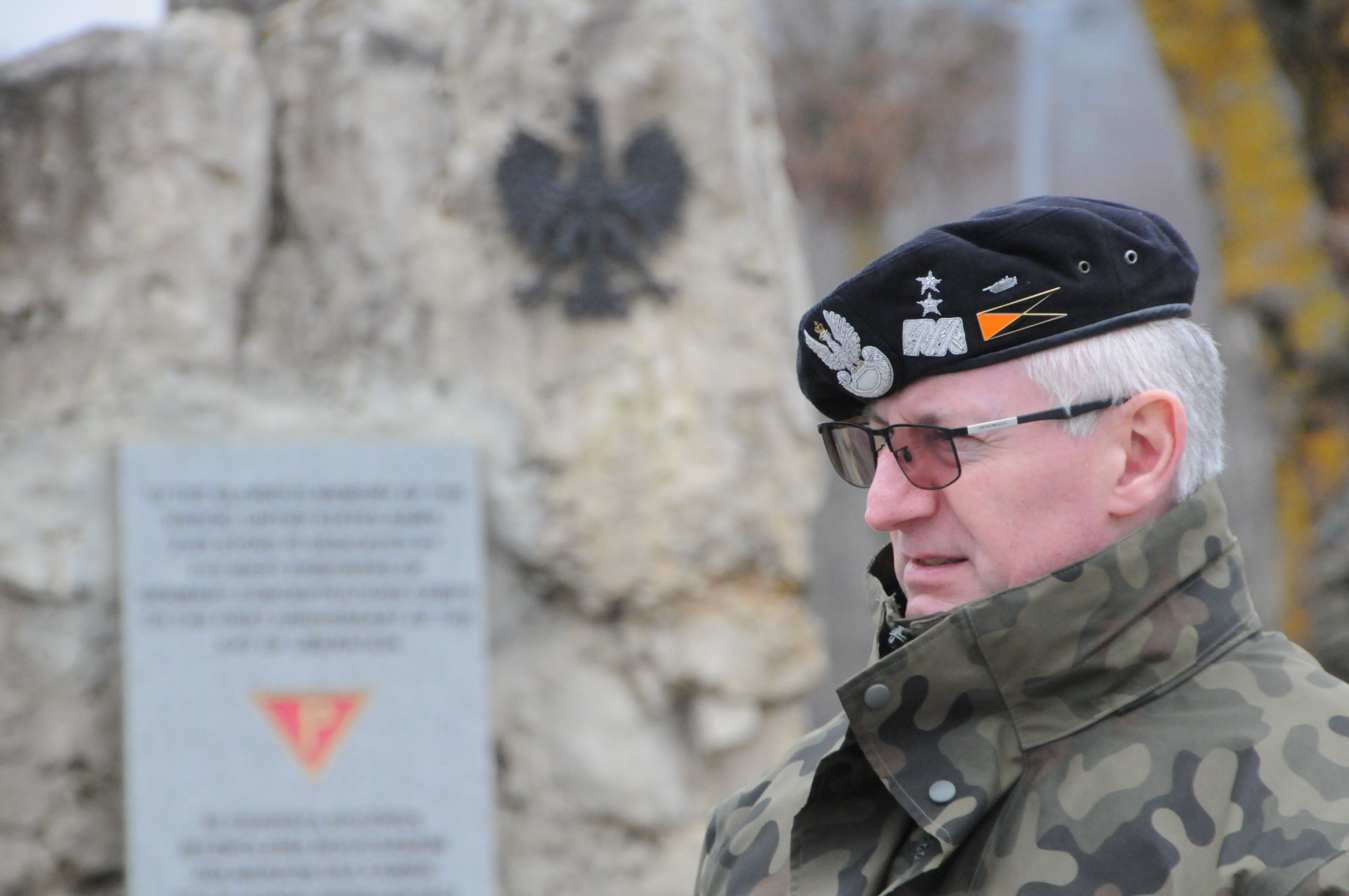
- Divis. Gen. Piotr Fajkowski, commander of CAT-C (EUMAM UA) and 11th Armoured Cavalry Division, at the Polish WWII PoW memorial. FEB 5, 2025, Bavaria, Germany
- Operational scope: Training coordination: delivering support; specialised provision; individual/collective
- Locations: Sites across EU, incl.: 50.8453°N 4.3901°E von-Hardenberg-Kaserne, Strausberg, DE; 52.5913°N 13.9196°E; Barrack, Żagań, PL
- Planned: on 12 month horizon
- Planned by: EEAS (including EUMS and MPCC)
- Commanded by: LTG Michiel van der Laan, Dir MPCC; Royal Netherlands Army
- Objective: Strengthening AFU capacity; Capable force development; Russian aggression deterrence
- Date: JUN 2022 • NOV 2022 • present (CET UTC+01:00/CEST UTC+02:00)
- Executed by: Dir MPCC / DGEUMS (trial hat)
- Outcome: 75,000 AFU personnel trained (Note: As of March 2025, equivalent to nineteen brigades.)
- Official website

The European Union Military Assistance Mission in support of Ukraine (Ukrainian: Місія воєнного сприяння Європейського Союзу в підтримку України, romanized: Misiia voennogo spryiannia Evropeiskogo Soiuzu v pidtrymku Ukrainy, EUMAM Ukraine/UA) is the European Union's (EU) first military assistance mission for Ukraine set up on 17 October 2022. The decision to establish EUMAM was made by the Council of the European Union in response to Ukraine's request for military support during the ongoing Russian invasion of the country. The primary aim of the mission is to provide training to the Armed Forces of Ukraine in the territory of the EU member states.

== Background ==
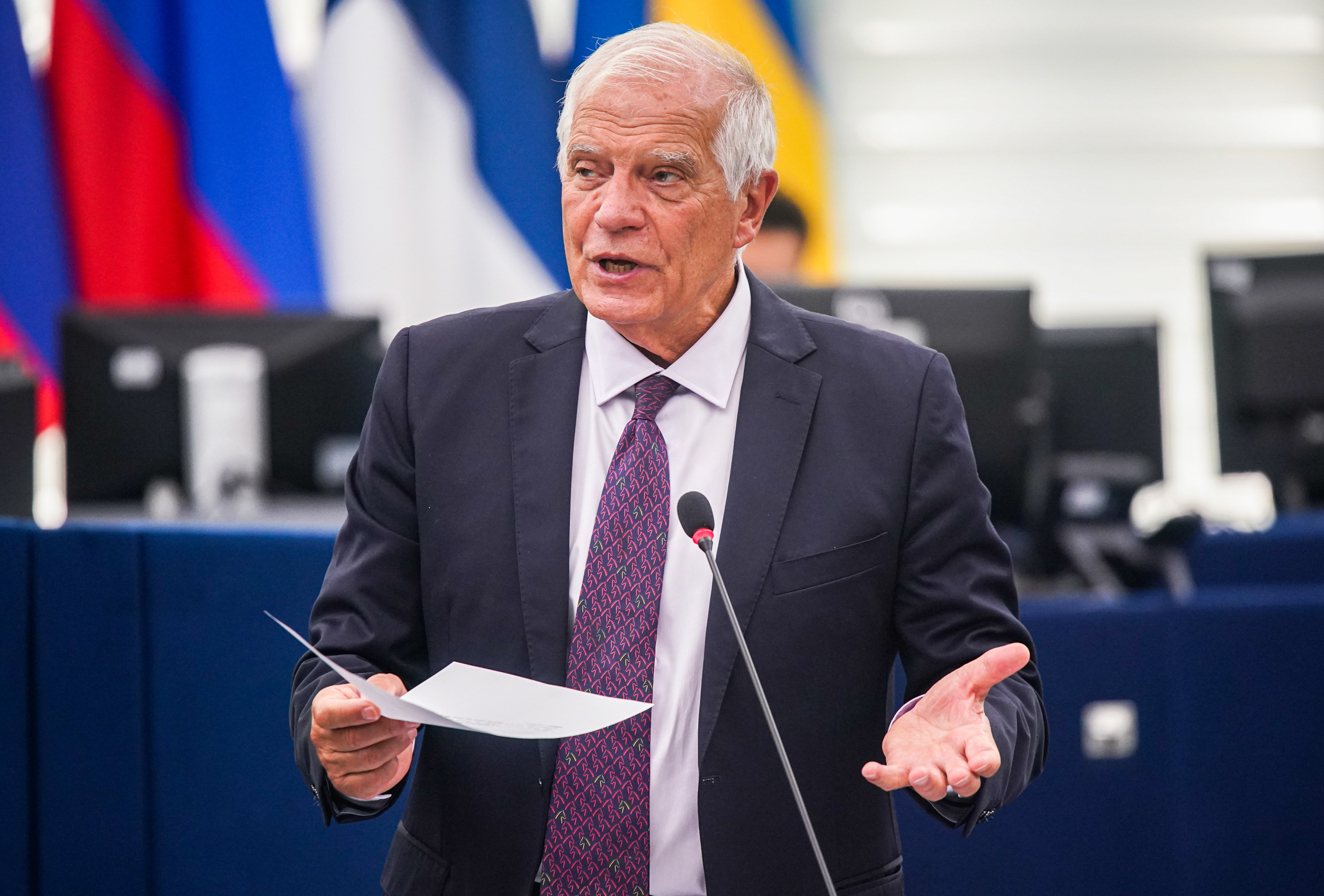
High Representative of the EU for foreign affairs Josep Borrell addressing the European Parliament in September 2022

The diplomatic framework for the establishment of the EUMAM Ukraine was created by the 23–24 June 2022 EU's statement on its commitment to providing "military support to help Ukraine exercise its inherent right of self-defence against the Russian aggression" and the 30 September 2022 official letter by the Ministers for Foreign Affairs and Defense of Ukraine to the High Representative, requesting military support. The European Union Advisory Mission Ukraine to support reforms in civilian security sector has been active since 2014.

== Mission ==
The EUMAM Ukraine envisages individual, collective and specialized training to the Armed Forces of Ukraine, including to their Territorial Defense Forces, and coordination and synchronization of the EU member states' activities supporting the delivery of training. EUMAM Ukraine will operate in the territory of the EU member states, with its Operational Headquarters within the European External Action Service (EEAS) in Brussels. The French naval officer, Vice Admiral Hervé Bléjean—the incumbent Director of the Military Planning and Conduct Capability within the EEAS—was appointed the Mission Commander. The EUMAM's mandate will initially last two years, with the financial reference amount of 106,7 million euros.

The integration of the training components to create formed units takes place in a multinational Combined Arms Training Command (CAT-C) established in Poland under the command of the Polish Major General Piotr Trytek. A multinational Special Training Command (MN ST-C) under the command of the German Lieutenant General Andreas Marlow commands training activities in Germany to further enhance the training offer in full coordination with CAT-C. Other Member States provide specific training across Europe.

EUMAM works closely together with all other like-minded international partners to provide training support to the Ukrainian Armed Forces. All mission activities are located on EU soil.

There are also broader implications for the militaries involved in the training of Ukrainians. For instance, German instructors operating under the EUMAM training mandate have described how they do not have the doctrine or training manuals to properly train Ukrainian soldiers, especially in trench warfare tactics. In other cases, Polish advisors at the CAT-C have described how they have become more flexible to their training approach to help the Ukrainians be more militarily effective, while also using this experience to improve their own doctrine and training manuals. Both of these writings indicate how the EU is demonstrating strategic autonomy by training and equipping more Ukrainian forces outside of formalistic NATO frameworks. Hence, that is why there are growing arguments for the insertion of EU-flagged advisors to deploy to Ukraine to train them on Ukrainian soil, because such a EUMAM operation would be unaffiliated with NATO.

== Timeline ==
- On 8 November 2024, the Council of the EU adopted a decision extending the mandate of the mission for a further two years, until 15 November 2026, with a budget allocation of nearly €409 million for the period from 14 November 2024 to 15 November 2026.
- On March 4, 2025, Ursula von der Leyen announced the EU's €800 billion ($840 billion) defence investment plan "ReArm Europe".

== Non-participation in EU training efforts ==
While the absence of Hungary, Austria, and Croatia is symbolically and politically significant, especially in terms of European solidarity, their practical impact on the training mission appears limited. The scale and depth of participation from the remaining EU states, especially defense actors such as Germany, Poland, France, the Netherlands, Sweden, Denmark, and the Baltic states, allowed EUMAM Ukraine to sustain and, in fact, expand its training capacity in 2024 and 2025. Nonetheless, the refusal of full participation by even a few member states has been a subject of repeated debate, particularly in the European Parliament. Civil society, think-tanks, and academic commentators have cited Austria’s and Malta’s constitutions as legitimate reasons for abstention, but political opposition in Hungary and Croatia has drawn sharper rebuke for undermining EU leverage and “allowing Russia to capitalize on European division”.

== See also ==
- Ukraine–European Union relations
- Operation Interflex
- Operation Unifier
- Ukraine Defense Contact Group
- USAI
