= Command and control structure of the European Union =

One of several HQs for EU military or civilian missions

Location of alternative OHQs for EU-led military operations: EU headquarters, NATO headquarters and national OHQs offered by member states are shown with red, blue and yellow marks, respectively
Location of the CPCC, which commands all civilian missions

This article outlines the command and control structure of the European Union's missions, which are deployed as part of the Common Security and Defence Policy (CSDP). This structure ranges from the political strategic level to the tactical level.

At the military/civilian strategic level, missions are commanded by an operation headquarters (OHQ). For all civilian missions the Civilian Operations Headquarters (CivOpsHQ) serves this purpose. For each military mission an OHQ is chosen from a list of available facilities. The European Union (EU) does not have a permanent military command structure along the lines of the North Atlantic Treaty Organization's (NATO) Allied Command Operations (ACO), although it has been agreed that ACO resources may be used for the conduct of the EU's CSDP missions. The Military Planning and Conduct Capability (MPCC), established in 2017 and to be strengthened in 2020, does however represent the EU's first step in developing a permanent OHQ.

The MPCC and CivOpsHQ are counterparts that cooperate through the Joint Support Coordination Cell (JSCC).

The CivOpsHQ, MPCC and JSCC are all part of the External Action Service (EEAS), and situated in the Kortenberg building in Brussels, Belgium.

== Overview ==
The EU command and control (C2) structure is directed by political bodies composed of member states' representatives, and generally requires unanimous decisions. As of April 2019:

Liaison: Advice and recommendations Support and monitoring Preparatory work

Political strategic level:^{[5]}
ISS	EUCO Pres. (EUCO)	Chain of command
Coordination/support
SatCen	CIVCOM	HR/VP (FAC)
INTCEN	HR/VP (PMG)	HR/VP (PSC)^{[6]}	CEUMC (EUMC)
CMPD	DGEUMS^{[3]} (EUMS)
Military/civilian strategic level:
Dir MPCC^{[3]} (MPCC)	JSCC	Civ OpCdr CPCC^{[1]}
Operational level:
MFCdr^{[4]} (MFHQ)	HoM^{[1]}
Tactical level:
CC^{[2]}Air; CC^{[2]} Land; CC^{[2]} Mar; Other CCs^{[2]} European Armed Forces

^{1} In the event of a CSDP Civilian Mission also being in the field, the relations with the Civilian Planning and Conduct Capability (CPCC) and its Civilian Operation Commander (Civ OpCdr), as well as the subordinate Head of Mission (HoM), are coordinated as shown.

^{2} Other Component Commanders (CCs) and service branches which may be established.

^{3} The MPCC is part of the EUMS and Dir MPCC is double-hatted as DGEUMS. Unless the MPCC is used as Operation Headquarters (OHQ), either a national OHQ offered by member states or the NATO Command Structure (NCS) would serve this purpose. In the latter instance, Deputy Supreme Allied Commander Europe (DSACEUR), rather than Dir MPCC, would serve as Operation Commander (OpCdr).

^{4} Unless the MPCC is used as Operation Headquarters (OHQ), the MFCdr would be known as a Force Commander (FCdr), and direct a Force Headquarters (FHQ) rather than a MFHQ. Whereas the MFHQ would act both on the operational and tactical level, the FHQ would act purely on the operational level.

^{5} The political strategic level is not part of the C2 structure per se, but represents the political bodies, with associated support facilities, that determine the missions' general direction. The Council determines the role of the High Representative (HR/VP), who serves as Vice-President of the European Commission, attends European Council meetings, chairs the Foreign Affairs Council (FAC) and may chair the Political and Security Committee (PSC) in times of crisis. The HR/VP proposes and implements CSDP decisions.

^{6} Same composition as Committee of Permanent Representatives (COREPER) II, which also prepares for the CSDP-related work of the FAC.

== Civilian missions ==
=== Strategic level ===
All civilian missions are directed on the strategic level by the Civilian Operations Headquarters (CivOpsHQ), formerly called the Civilian Planning and Conduct Capability (CPCC), a directorate of the External Action Service (EEAS) in Brussels, Belgium. The Director of the CivOpsHQ acts as Civilian Operation Commander (Civ OpCdr).

=== Operational level ===
The CivOpsHQ directs the subordinate Head of Mission (HoM), who administers the mission on the operational level.

== Military missions and operations ==
=== Strategic level ===
==== Command options for EU-led missions ====
For each military mission (certain missions are also referred to as operation), the Council nominates a dedicated OHQ. This section outlines the main options for OHQ.

===== Autonomous operations and missions =====
- Military Planning and Conduct Capability (MPCC) of the EEAS' Military Staff (EUMS) in Brussels, Belgium

Established in 2017, the MPCC is the EU's first permanent OHQ and supersedes the previous EU OPCEN. At present it may run only non-executive operations, but will by the end of 2020 the MPCC will also be capable of running executive operations of up to 2500 troops (i.e. the size of one battle group).

- National OHQ offered by member states:

Centre for Planning and Conduct of Operations (CPCO) in Paris, France
Armed Forces Operational Command in Potsdam, Germany
First Army (Hellenic European Union Operational Headquarters, EL EU OHQ) in Larissa, Greece
Italian Joint Force Headquarters (ITA-JFHQ) in Centocelle, Rome, Italy
Strategic-level Headquarters of the European Union in Spain (ES OHQ) at Naval Station Rota, Spain (see es:Mando de Operaciones, the Spanish national nucleus of the HQ).

The practice of activating ad hoc national OHQs has been criticised as being inefficient due to high start-up costs and fact that their temporary nature to a certain extent prevents the staff forming a strong working relationships and ‘collective memory’.

===== Operations with recourse to NATO assets and capabilities =====
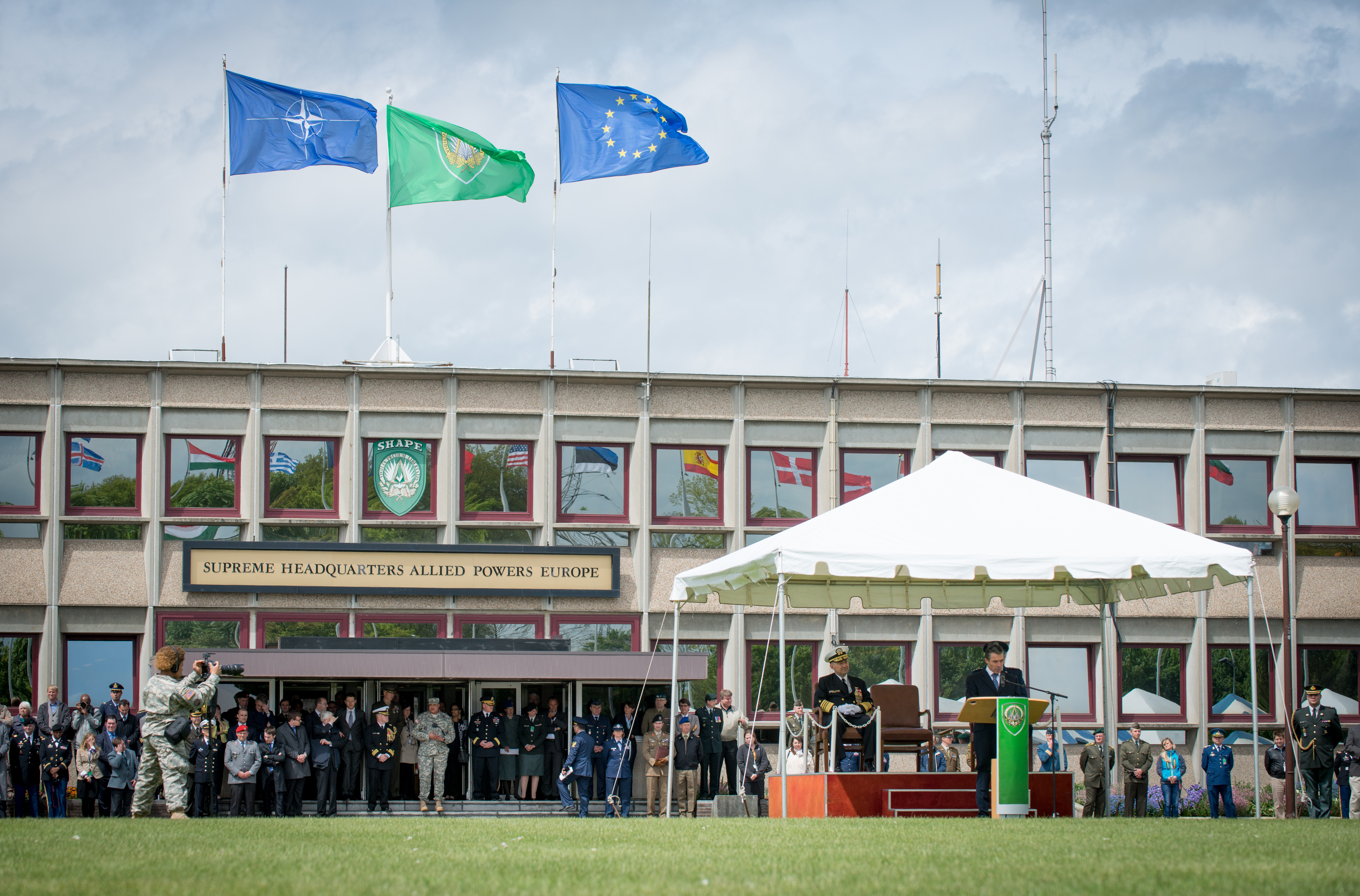
Change of command for the post of Supreme Commander Allied Forces Europe (SACEUR) at Supreme Headquarters Allied Powers Europe (SHAPE), the main headquarters of the North Atlantic Treaty Organisation’s Allied Command Operations (ACO). SHAPE’s main building also flies the EU flag, reflecting the Berlin Plus agreement.

- NATO Command Structure (NCS): An OHQ would be set up within the Supreme Headquarters Allied Powers Europe (SHAPE) in Mons, Belgium. SHAPE is the main headquarters of Allied Command Operations (ACO).

The Berlin Plus agreement requires that the use of NATO assets by the EU is subject to a "right of first refusal", i.e. NATO must first decline to intervene in a given crisis, and is contingent on unanimous approval among NATO states, including those outside of the EU. For example, Turkish reservations about Operation Concordia using NATO assets delayed its deployment by more than five months.

==== Operation Commander ====
Each OHQ is led by an Operation Commander (OpCdr).

When the MPCC acts as OHQ, the OpCdr is the MPCC Director, who is also Director General of the European Union Military Staff (EUMS).

When the NCS provides the OHQ, the OpCdr is the Deputy Supreme Allied Commander Europe (DSACEUR).

=== Operational level ===
The OHQ directs the subordinate Force Headquarters (FHQ), which carries out the operation on the tactical level (i.e. on the ground). The FHQ is led by a Force Commander (FCdr).

In case the MPCC acts as OHQ, the FHQ is termed Mission Force Headquarters (MFHQ) instead. The MFHQ is led by a Mission Force Commander (MFCdr).

=== Tactical level ===
The FCdr/MFCdr directs Component Commanders (CCs) for all service branches that may be required as part of the operation. The military forces within each component is subordinate to the CC.

== Civilian-military coordination ==
In the event that both a military and civilian mission are in the field, the military OHQ and its Operation Commander (OpCdr) coordinate relations on the strategic level horizontally with the Civilian Operations Headquarters (CivOpsHQ) and its Civilian Operations Commander (CivOpsCdr). Equally, on the tactical level the military Force Headquarters (FHQ) and its Force Commander (FCdr) coordinate relations horizontally with the civilian Head of Mission (HoM).

If the Military Planning and Conduct Capability acts as OHQ, it will coordinate its relations with the CivOpsHQ through the Joint Support Coordination Cell (JSCC).

== See also ==
- Command and control
- Structure of the Common Security and Defence Policy
- List of military and civilian missions of the European Union
- Berlin Plus agreement
- Structure of NATO
