= Civilian Planning and Conduct Capability =

Organisation within the European Union

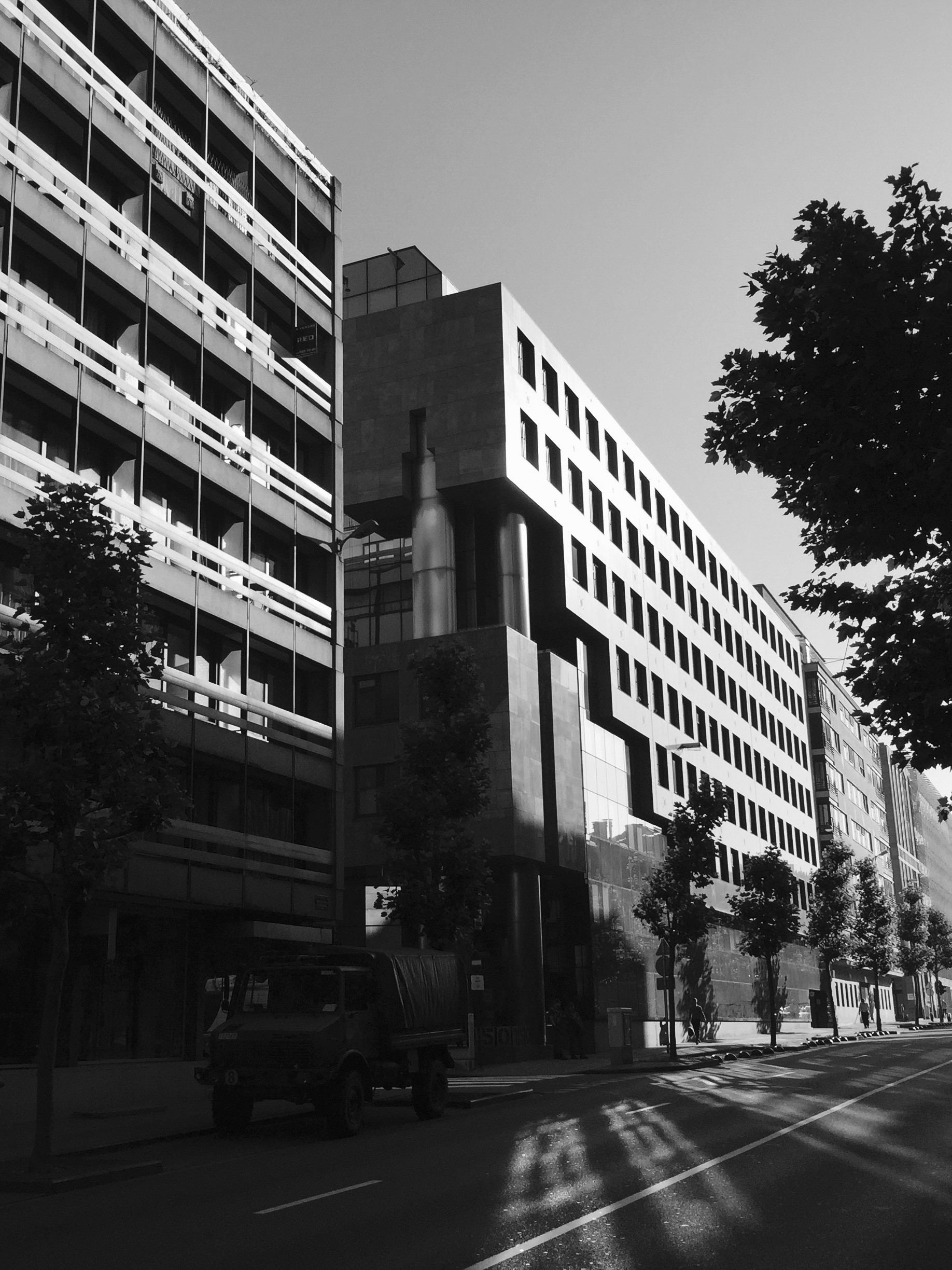
Kortenberg building

The Civilian Planning and Conduct Capability (CPCC) was the directorate of the External Action Service (EEAS) of the European Union (EU) that served as operational headquarters (OHQ) for the civilian missions of the Common Security and Defence Policy (CSDP). In March 2025 the CPCC was superseded by the EU Civilian Operations Headquarters.

Through the Joint Support Coordination Cell (JSCC), the CPCC cooperated with its military counterpart, the Military Planning and Conduct Capability (MPCC).

The CPCC was situated in the Kortenberg building in Brussels, Belgium, along with a number of other CSDP bodies.

== Director ==
The CPCC Director, as Civilian Operations Commander (Civ OpCdr), exercises command and control at strategic level for the operational planning and conduct of all civilian crisis management operations. The Civ OpCdr is assisted by number of senior policy experts.

== Divisions ==
The CPCC was composed of the following divisions as of September 2019:

	Director
Conduct of Operations	Chief of Staff/ Horizontal Co-ordination	Missions Personnel	Missions Operational; Support

=== Conduct of operations ===
The Conduct of Operations Division is in continuous contact with the civilian CSDP missions. On behalf of the Civ OpCdr it supports Heads of Mission (HoMs) and mission staff to deliver on their respective mandates, and ensures that the political objectives of the High Representative (HR/VP) and the member states are followed by the missions.

The division consists of three geographically-organised sections, made up of administrator (AD) and assistant (AST) officials, seconded national experts including subject matter experts on policing, rule of law and maritime issues:

- Europe
- Africa
- Asia/Middle East

This division also has responsibility for the revision of OPLANs in line with CIVCOM and PSC advice.

=== Chief of Staff/Horizontal Co-ordination ===
The Chief of Staff Division is responsible for internal co-ordination of day-to-day issues. On top of that it has strategic responsibilities which are carried out by two sections:

- Operational Capability: This section is primarily responsible for providing guidance on cross-cutting issues such as lessons learnt, including the development of operational guidelines to ensure greater consistency and coherence on operational mandate delivery.
- Operational Planning: This section supports operational planning and establishment of civilian CSDP missions, establishing Planning Teams to develop operational planning documents such as the Concept of Operation (CONOPS) and Operational Plan (OPLAN), and to support Missions in all aspects of their start-up phase.

=== Mission Personnel ===
The Missions Personnel Division is in charge of human resources policy for civilian missions and organises the selection of international mission staff. The division is responsible for seconded Staff and interacts with the seconding authorities on all issues related to the secondments. For international contracted staff, the division is in charge of horizontal contractual issues and coordinates all legal aspects, as well as litigation. The division is the data protection correspondent for the civilian missions, and coordinates Ombudsman cases for the Directorate. The division is the lead service for the Goalkeeper project, which is the main IT instrument for the selection of staff. the contacts assists the Missions in the management of their staff. Together with Missions Operational Support Division the Mission Personnel Division develops IT applications for human resources management.

=== Missions Operational Support ===
The Missions Operational Support Division is responsible for CIS, IT applications as well as logistics and procurement at Headquarters level. The Division manages the delivery of equipment to the ten civilian CSDP Missions, ensuring that all the financial and legal rules are adhered to in the procurement and usage of such equipment. In this function, the division also liaises with the civilian CSDP Warehouse located in Southern Sweden and managed by the Swedish Civil Contingencies Agency (MSB). Furthermore, the division assists the civilian Missions in defining and managing their budgets with the relevant stakeholders (EU Member States and Foreign Policy Instruments). The division is the contact point of the CPCC for the RELEX Working Group of the Council.

== Role in the command and control structure ==
The EU command and control (C2) structure is directed by political bodies composed of member states' representatives, and generally requires unanimous decisions. As of April 2019:

Liaison: Advice and recommendations Support and monitoring Preparatory work

Political strategic level:^{[5]}
ISS	EUCO Pres. (EUCO)	Chain of command
Coordination/support
SatCen	CIVCOM	HR/VP (FAC)
INTCEN	HR/VP (PMG)	HR/VP (PSC)^{[6]}	CEUMC (EUMC)
CMPD	DGEUMS^{[3]} (EUMS)
Military/civilian strategic level:
Dir MPCC^{[3]} (MPCC)	JSCC	Civ OpCdr CPCC^{[1]}
Operational level:
MFCdr^{[4]} (MFHQ)	HoM^{[1]}
Tactical level:
CC^{[2]} Land	CC^{[2]} Air	CC^{[2]} Mar	Other CCs^{[2]}
Forces	Forces	Forces	Forces

^{1} In the event of a CSDP Civilian Mission also being in the field, the relations with the Civilian Planning and Conduct Capability (CPCC) and its Civilian Operation Commander (Civ OpCdr), as well as the subordinate Head of Mission (HoM), are coordinated as shown.

^{2} Other Component Commanders (CCs) and service branches which may be established.

^{3} The MPCC is part of the EUMS and Dir MPCC is double-hatted as DGEUMS. Unless the MPCC is used as Operation Headquarters (OHQ), either a national OHQ offered by member states or the NATO Command Structure (NCS) would serve this purpose. In the latter instance, Deputy Supreme Allied Commander Europe (DSACEUR), rather than Dir MPCC, would serve as Operation Commander (OpCdr).

^{4} Unless the MPCC is used as Operation Headquarters (OHQ), the MFCdr would be known as a Force Commander (FCdr), and direct a Force Headquarters (FHQ) rather than a MFHQ. Whereas the MFHQ would act both on the operational and tactical level, the FHQ would act purely on the operational level.

^{5} The political strategic level is not part of the C2 structure per se, but represents the political bodies, with associated support facilities, that determine the missions' general direction. The Council determines the role of the High Representative (HR/VP), who serves as Vice-President of the European Commission, attends European Council meetings, chairs the Foreign Affairs Council (FAC) and may chair the Political and Security Committee (PSC) in times of crisis. The HR/VP proposes and implements CSDP decisions.

^{6} Same composition as Committee of Permanent Representatives (COREPER) II, which also prepares for the CSDP-related work of the FAC.

== See also ==
- Military Planning and Conduct Capability
- List of military and civilian missions of the European Union
- European Centre of Excellence for Civilian Crisis Management
