= Joint Support Coordination Cell =

Planned European Union security and defence body

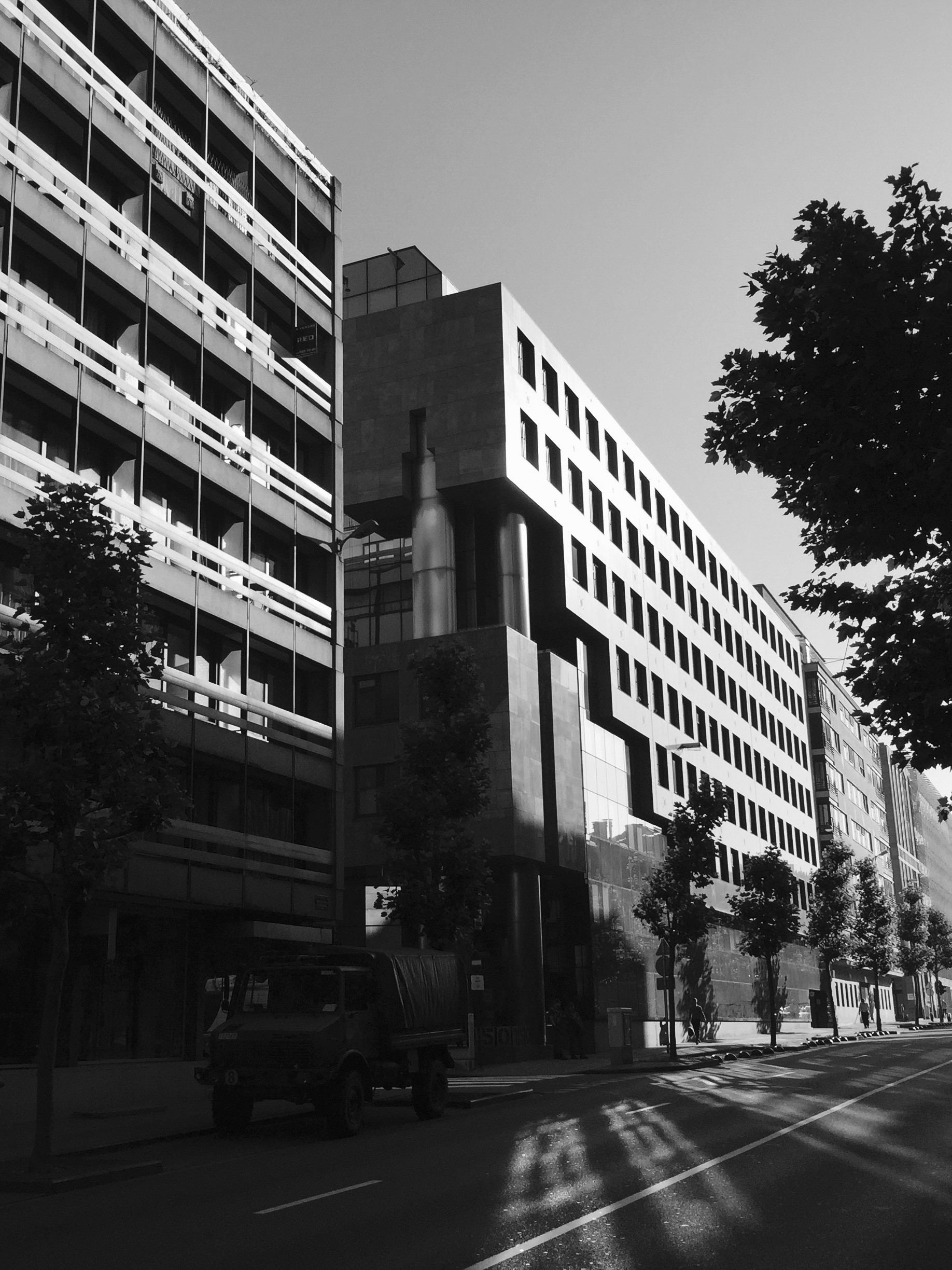
Kortenberg building

The Joint Support Coordination Cell (JSCC) is the planned security and defence (CSDP) body of the European Union's (EU) European External Action Service (EEAS) that will provide for relations between the civilian and military planning and conduct capabilities, abbreviated CPCC and MPCC, respectively, in the context of civilian and military missions.

== Tasks ==
The JSCC would unite the following civilian-military support functions:

- 24/7 watchkeeping functions of the European Union Military Staff (EUMS)
- Legal advice (in coordination with the Legal Affairs Division of the EEAS)
- Expertise on United Nations Security Council Resolution 1325 (and subsequent resolutions)
- Strategic communications (STRATCOM)
- Logistics
- Communications and information services (CIS)
- Medical support
- Field security
- Cyber
- Premises

The organisation of the JSCC is set to build upon previous experience from the now-defunct European Union Operations Centre (EU OPCEN).

== Organisation ==
The MPCC and CPCC will both provide staff for the cell and ensure sharing of expertise in the areas of mission planning, conduct and support. The chiefs of the staff of the MPCC and CPCC are set to coordinate the daily work of the civilian/military teams of the JSCC, who would be co-located where possible. Administratively they would remain part of the MPCC/EUMS or the CPCC respectively, and the civilian and military lines of command would remain separate and distinct.

== Role in the command and control structure ==
The EU command and control (C2) structure is directed by political bodies composed of member states' representatives, and generally requires unanimous decisions. As of April 2019:

Liaison: Advice and recommendations Support and monitoring Preparatory work

Political strategic level:^{[5]}
ISS	EUCO Pres. (EUCO)	Chain of command
Coordination/support
SatCen	CIVCOM	HR/VP (FAC)
INTCEN	HR/VP (PMG)	HR/VP (PSC)^{[6]}	CEUMC (EUMC)
CMPD	DGEUMS^{[3]} (EUMS)
Military/civilian strategic level:
Dir MPCC^{[3]} (MPCC)	JSCC	Civ OpCdr CPCC^{[1]}
Operational level:
MFCdr^{[4]} (MFHQ)	HoM^{[1]}
Tactical level:
CC^{[2]}Air; CC^{[2]} Land; CC^{[2]} Mar; Other CCs^{[2]} European Armed Forces

^{1} In the event of a CSDP Civilian Mission also being in the field, the relations with the Civilian Planning and Conduct Capability (CPCC) and its Civilian Operation Commander (Civ OpCdr), as well as the subordinate Head of Mission (HoM), are coordinated as shown.

^{2} Other Component Commanders (CCs) and service branches which may be established.

^{3} The MPCC is part of the EUMS and Dir MPCC is double-hatted as DGEUMS. Unless the MPCC is used as Operation Headquarters (OHQ), either a national OHQ offered by member states or the NATO Command Structure (NCS) would serve this purpose. In the latter instance, Deputy Supreme Allied Commander Europe (DSACEUR), rather than Dir MPCC, would serve as Operation Commander (OpCdr).

^{4} Unless the MPCC is used as Operation Headquarters (OHQ), the MFCdr would be known as a Force Commander (FCdr), and direct a Force Headquarters (FHQ) rather than a MFHQ. Whereas the MFHQ would act both on the operational and tactical level, the FHQ would act purely on the operational level.

^{5} The political strategic level is not part of the C2 structure per se, but represents the political bodies, with associated support facilities, that determine the missions' general direction. The Council determines the role of the High Representative (HR/VP), who serves as Vice-President of the European Commission, attends European Council meetings, chairs the Foreign Affairs Council (FAC) and may chair the Political and Security Committee (PSC) in times of crisis. The HR/VP proposes and implements CSDP decisions.

^{6} Same composition as Committee of Permanent Representatives (COREPER) II, which also prepares for the CSDP-related work of the FAC.

== See also ==
- Civilian Planning and Conduct Capability
- Military Planning and Conduct Capability
