= Military Planning and Conduct Capability =

EU permanent strategic-level operational headquarters for military operations

Coordinates: 50°50′43″N 4°23′25″E

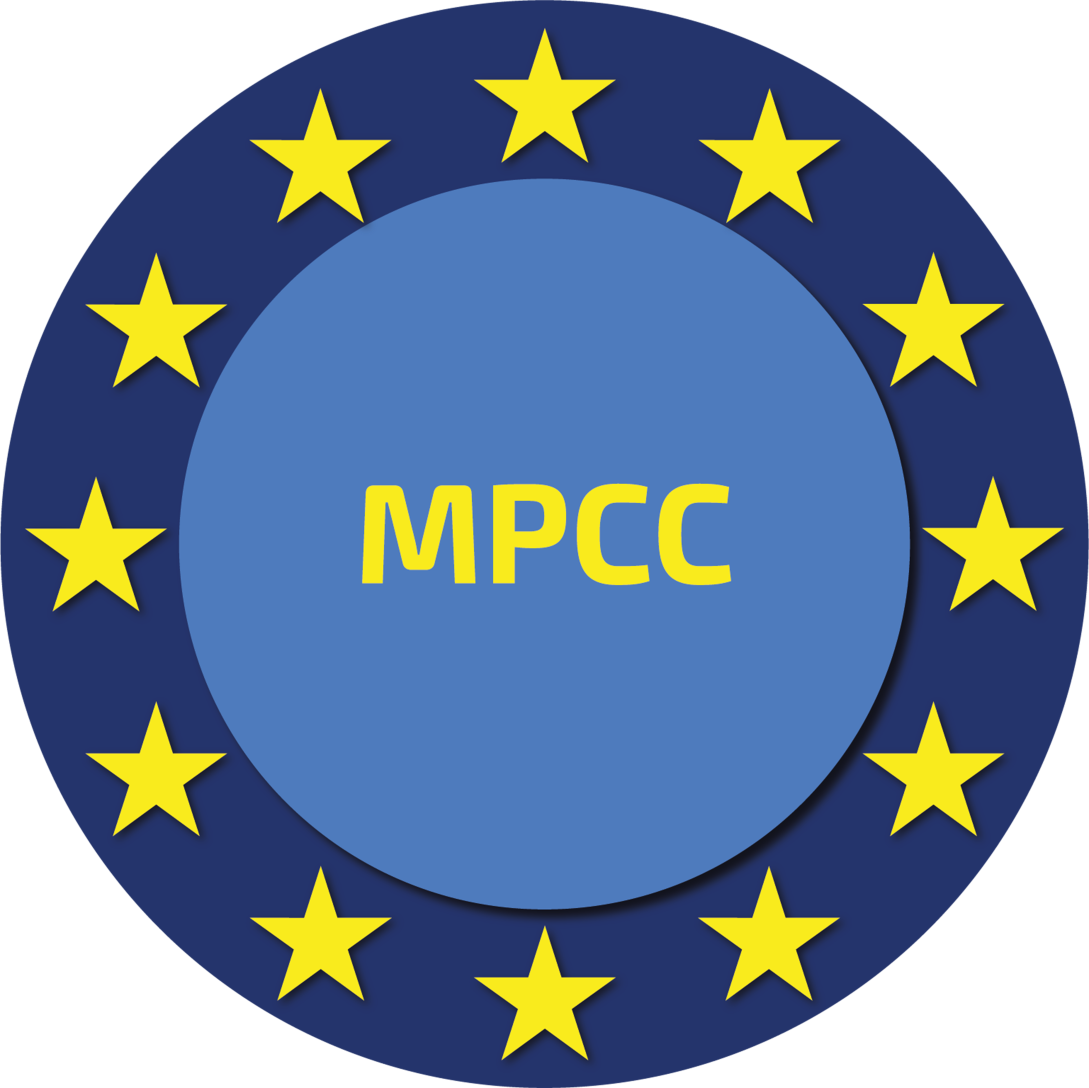
- Active: 8 June 2017–present
- Allegiance: European Union
- Type: Operational headquarters
- Role: Commands CSDP operations
- Size: 154 personnel (prospective)
- Part of: European Union Military Staff of the European External Action Service
- Location: AN88 building, Brussels, Belgium
- Website: europa.eu

Commanders
- High Repr.: Kaja Kallas
- Director General: Lt. General Michiel van der Laan (since 28 June 2023)
- Chief of Staff: MJG Werner Albl

The Military Planning and Conduct Capability (MPCC) is a permanent operational headquarters (OHQ) at the military strategic level for military operations of up to 2,500 troops (i.e. the size of one battle group) deployed as part of the Common Security and Defence Policy (CSDP) of the European Union (EU) by the end of 2020. Since its inception in 2017, the MPCC has commanded three non-executive training missions in Somalia, Mali and the Central African Republic, and will organise the training of Ukrainian forces on EU soil.

The MPCC is part of the EU Military Staff (EUMS), a directorate-general of the European External Action Service (EEAS). The director general of the EUMS also serves as director of the MPCC, exercising command and control over the operations.

Through the Joint Support Coordination Cell (JSCC), the MPCC cooperates with its civilian counterpart, the Civilian Planning and Conduct Capability (CPCC).

The MPCC is situated in the Kortenberg building in Brussels, Belgium, along with a number of other CSDP bodies.

== History ==
=== 2016-2020: MPCC established for non-executive missions ===
In 2016, the European Union Global Strategy was adopted a British referendum was held and resulted in favour of UK withdrawal (Brexit). In its November 2016 Conclusions on implementing the Global Strategy in the area of security and defence, the Council of the EU invited High Representative Morgherini to propose ‘a permanent operational planning and conduct capability at the strategic level for non-executive military missions’ under political control and strategic direction of the Political and Security Committee (PSC).

On 8 June 2017, the Council of the European Union (EU) decided to establish a Military Planning and Conduct Capability (MPCC), albeit not permitted to run executive missions in order to avoid a British veto.

A non-executive military mission is defined as an operation conducted in support of a host nation which has an advisory role only. In comparison to an executive military operation which is mandated to conduct actions in replacement of the host nation. Combat operations would fall into this category.

=== 2020-: First mandate extension ===
EU officials have indicated that a review in 2018 might extend the MPCC's mandate to include operations with combat elements - or so-called executive missions. Diplomats have indicated that the MPCC will be 'rebranded' as the EU's Operational Headquarters (OHQ) after the British withdrawal from the Union, which was scheduled to happen on 31 October 2019. On 20 November 2018 the MPCC's mandate was expanded to include executive operations, i.e. with combat elements, by the end of 2020. As such, the MPCC takes over role of the previous European Union Operations Centre (EU OPCEN).

=== Second mandate extension ===
A further review of the MPCC's roles and responsibilities has been agreed with a view to completion by the end of 2020. It is expected that the review will recommend the expansion of the MPCC's role even further and establish it as the EU military planning HQ that several member states have long hoped for and the UK has always opposed.

This should be seen in connection with a Permanent Structured Cooperation project titled Strategic Command and Control System for CSDP Missions and Operations. This aims to "improve the command and control systems of EU missions and operations at the strategic level. Once implemented, the project will enhance the military decision-making process, improve the planning and conduct of missions, and the coordination of EU forces. The Strategic Command and Control (C2) System for CSDP Missions will connect users by delivering information systems and decision-making support tools that will assist strategic commanders carry out their missions. Integration of information systems would include intelligence, surveillance, command and control, and logistics systems."

== Structure ==
The EU command and control (C2) structure is directed by political bodies composed of member states' representatives, and generally requires unanimous decisions. As of April 2019:

Liaison: Advice and recommendations Support and monitoring Preparatory work

Political strategic level:^{[5]}
ISS	EUCO Pres. (EUCO)	Chain of command
Coordination/support
SatCen	CIVCOM	HR/VP (FAC)
INTCEN	HR/VP (PMG)	HR/VP (PSC)^{[6]}	CEUMC (EUMC)
CMPD	DGEUMS^{[3]} (EUMS)
Military/civilian strategic level:
Dir MPCC^{[3]} (MPCC)	JSCC	Civ OpCdr CPCC^{[1]}
Operational level:
MFCdr^{[4]} (MFHQ)	HoM^{[1]}
Tactical level:
CC^{[2]}Air; CC^{[2]} Land; CC^{[2]} Mar; Other CCs^{[2]} European Armed Forces

^{1} In the event of a CSDP Civilian Mission also being in the field, the relations with the Civilian Planning and Conduct Capability (CPCC) and its Civilian Operation Commander (Civ OpCdr), as well as the subordinate Head of Mission (HoM), are coordinated as shown.

^{2} Other Component Commanders (CCs) and service branches which may be established.

^{3} The MPCC is part of the EUMS and Dir MPCC is double-hatted as DGEUMS. Unless the MPCC is used as Operation Headquarters (OHQ), either a national OHQ offered by member states or the NATO Command Structure (NCS) would serve this purpose. In the latter instance, Deputy Supreme Allied Commander Europe (DSACEUR), rather than Dir MPCC, would serve as Operation Commander (OpCdr).

^{4} Unless the MPCC is used as Operation Headquarters (OHQ), the MFCdr would be known as a Force Commander (FCdr), and direct a Force Headquarters (FHQ) rather than a MFHQ. Whereas the MFHQ would act both on the operational and tactical level, the FHQ would act purely on the operational level.

^{5} The political strategic level is not part of the C2 structure per se, but represents the political bodies, with associated support facilities, that determine the missions' general direction. The Council determines the role of the High Representative (HR/VP), who serves as Vice-President of the European Commission, attends European Council meetings, chairs the Foreign Affairs Council (FAC) and may chair the Political and Security Committee (PSC) in times of crisis. The HR/VP proposes and implements CSDP decisions.

^{6} Same composition as Committee of Permanent Representatives (COREPER) II, which also prepares for the CSDP-related work of the FAC.

The MPCC is a single military strategic command and control structure, responsible for the operational planning and conduct of military missions of up to 2,500 troops. This includes the building up, deployment, sustaining and recovery of EU forces. The MPCC will at present control the three EU training missions in Central African Republic, Mali and Somalia.

The MPCC will be reporting to the Political and Security Committee (PSC), and informing the EU Military Committee (EUMC). The MPCC will cooperate with its existing civilian counterpart, the Civilian Planning and Conduct Capability (CPCC), through a Joint Support Coordination Cell (JSCC).

The MPCC has a maximum of 60 personnel, in addition to personnel seconded from member states.

The relationship between the High Representative, the Military Staff and Military Committee as of November 2017: Colour key:
High Representative (a Vice-President of the Commission)
Military Committee (EUMC; a Council body)
Military Staff (EUMS; a Directorate-General of the External Action Service)

High Representative
Chairman EUMC
Working Group
Working Group/Headline Goal Task Force	Director General EUMS/ Director MPCC
Legal advisor	Deputy Director General	Horizontal Coordination
Assistant Chief of Staff for Synchronisation	EU cell at SHAPE	EU Liaison at the UN in NY	Assistant Chief of Staff for External Relations	NATO Permanent Liaison Team
Concepts & Capabilities; Directorate	Intelligence; Directorate	Operations; Directorate	Logistics; Directorate	Communications & Information Systems; Directorate	Military Planning and Conduct Capability (MPCC) Chief of Staff Working Group Current Operations

== Director ==
The director general of the EUMS also serves as the director of the MPCC and in that capacity assume the function of the single commander for all non-executive military missions, exercising command and control over the current three training missions and other possible future non-executive military missions.

The current three mission commanders will become ‘mission force commanders’ who will act under the command of the director of the MPCC and will remain responsible for exercising military command authority on the ground. The director of the MPCC will assume the same role, tasks and command relationships as those attributed to a military operation commander (OpCdr). He will exercise the responsibilities related to deployment and recovery of the missions as well as overall budgeting, auditing and reporting.

== See also ==
- Common Security and Defence Policy
- European External Action Service
  - European Union Military Staff
  - Civilian Planning and Conduct Capability
- List of military and civilian missions of the European Union
- Allied Command Operations of the North Atlantic Treaty Organization
  - Supreme Headquarters Allied Powers Europe
