= European Union Intelligence and Situation Centre =

Intelligence service of the European Union

EU Intelligence and Situation Centre
(in other official languages)
German	EU Nachrichten Analyse Zentrum
Spanish	Centro de inteligencia y situación de la Unión Europea
French	Centre d'analyse de renseignement de l'Union Européenne
Italian	Centro di Intelligence e Situazione dell'Unione Europea

Agency overview
- Formed: March 18, 2012
- Preceding agency: EU Situation Centre
- Type: Directorate in the EEAS
- Headquarters: EEAS building 1046 Brussels, Belgium; 50°50′33″N 4°23′8″E
- Employees: 70
- Agency executive: Daniel Markić, Director of the EU Intelligence and Situation Centre
- Parent agency: EEAS
- Key document: Treaty of Lisbon

The EU Intelligence and Situation Centre (EU INTCEN) is a "civilian intelligence function" of the European Union (EU). Structurally, it is a directorate of the External Action Service (EEAS) and reports directly to the EU's High Representative for Foreign Affairs and Security Policy. Article 4 of the Treaty on European Union, among other things, expressly states that "national security remains the sole responsibility of each Member State". EU INTCEN's analytical products are based on intelligence from the EU Member States' intelligence and security services.

== History ==
The EU INTCEN has its roots in the European Security and Defence Policy in what was then called the Joint Situation Centre. In the wake of the terrorist attacks on New York and Washington of 11 September 2001, the EU decided to use the existing Joint Situation Centre to start producing intelligence-based classified assessments.

In 2002, the Joint Situation Centre started to be a forum for exchange of sensitive information between the external intelligence services of France, Germany, Italy, the Netherlands, Spain, Sweden and the United Kingdom. At that time, the centre's mission was to:

- Contribute to early warning (in conjunction with other Council military staff) through open source material, military and nonmilitary intelligence and diplomatic reporting;
- Conduct situation monitoring and assessment;
- Provide facilities for crisis task force; and
- Provide an operational point of contact for the High Representative.

In June 2004, at the request of High Representative Javier Solana, the Council of the European Union agreed to establish within SITCEN a Counter Terrorist Cell. This Cell was tasked to produce Counter Terrorist intelligence analyses with the support of Member States' Security Services.

Since 2005, the SITCEN generally used the name EU Situation Centre. In 2012, it was officially renamed European Union Intelligence Analysis Centre (EU INTCEN). It assumed its current name in 2015.

Since January 2011, the EU INTCEN has been part of the European External Action Service (EEAS) under the authority of the EU's High Representative.

== Directors ==
- William Shapcott, a former British diplomat (2001–2010).
- Ilkka Salmi, previously the Head of the Finnish Security Intelligence Service (2011–2015).
- Gerhard Conrad, former Head of Foreign Intelligence Section of the BND (2015–2019).
- José Casimiro Morgado, previously the Director-General of Portugal's Serviço de Informações Estratégicas de Defesa (2019–2024).
- Daniel Markić, previously the Director of the Croatian Security and Intelligence Agency (2024–present).

== Organisation ==
As of 2019, the EU INTCEN is composed of three Divisions:

- Intelligence Analysis and Reporting Branch. It is responsible for providing strategic analysis based on input from the security and intelligence services of the Member States. It is composed of various sections, dealing with geographical and thematic topics.
- Intelligence Support Branch.
- Intelligence Policy Branch.

The total number of EU INTCEN staff in 2012 and 2013 was close to 70.

== Single Intelligence Analysis Capacity ==
Since 2007, the EU INTCEN has been part of the Single Intelligence Analysis Capacity (SIAC), which combines civilian intelligence (EU INTCEN) and military intelligence (EUMS Intelligence Directorate). In the framework of the SIAC, both civilian and military contributions are used to produce all-source intelligence assessments.

The EU INTCEN and the EUMS Intelligence Directorate are the main clients of the European Union Satellite Centre, which provides satellite imagery and analysis. The EU command and control (C2) structure is directed by political bodies composed of member states' representatives, and generally requires unanimous decisions. As of April 2019:

Liaison: Advice and recommendations Support and monitoring Preparatory work

Political strategic level:^{[5]}
ISS	EUCO Pres. (EUCO)	Chain of command
Coordination/support
SatCen	CIVCOM	HR/VP (FAC)
INTCEN	HR/VP (PMG)	HR/VP (PSC)^{[6]}	CEUMC (EUMC)
CMPD	DGEUMS^{[3]} (EUMS)
Military/civilian strategic level:
Dir MPCC^{[3]} (MPCC)	JSCC	Civ OpCdr CPCC^{[1]}
Operational level:
MFCdr^{[4]} (MFHQ)	HoM^{[1]}
Tactical level:
CC^{[2]}Air; CC^{[2]} Land; CC^{[2]} Mar; Other CCs^{[2]} European Armed Forces

^{1} In the event of a CSDP Civilian Mission also being in the field, the relations with the Civilian Planning and Conduct Capability (CPCC) and its Civilian Operation Commander (Civ OpCdr), as well as the subordinate Head of Mission (HoM), are coordinated as shown.

^{2} Other Component Commanders (CCs) and service branches which may be established.

^{3} The MPCC is part of the EUMS and Dir MPCC is double-hatted as DGEUMS. Unless the MPCC is used as Operation Headquarters (OHQ), either a national OHQ offered by member states or the NATO Command Structure (NCS) would serve this purpose. In the latter instance, Deputy Supreme Allied Commander Europe (DSACEUR), rather than Dir MPCC, would serve as Operation Commander (OpCdr).

^{4} Unless the MPCC is used as Operation Headquarters (OHQ), the MFCdr would be known as a Force Commander (FCdr), and direct a Force Headquarters (FHQ) rather than a MFHQ. Whereas the MFHQ would act both on the operational and tactical level, the FHQ would act purely on the operational level.

^{5} The political strategic level is not part of the C2 structure per se, but represents the political bodies, with associated support facilities, that determine the missions' general direction. The Council determines the role of the High Representative (HR/VP), who serves as Vice-President of the European Commission, attends European Council meetings, chairs the Foreign Affairs Council (FAC) and may chair the Political and Security Committee (PSC) in times of crisis. The HR/VP proposes and implements CSDP decisions.

^{6} Same composition as Committee of Permanent Representatives (COREPER) II, which also prepares for the CSDP-related work of the FAC.

== See also ==
- European Centre of Excellence for Countering Hybrid Threats
- Joint European Union Intelligence School
- Intelligence Directorate of the European Union Military Staff
