= Chairman of the European Union Military Committee =

Four-star rank officer presiding over the EU Military Committee

- CEUMC coat of arms

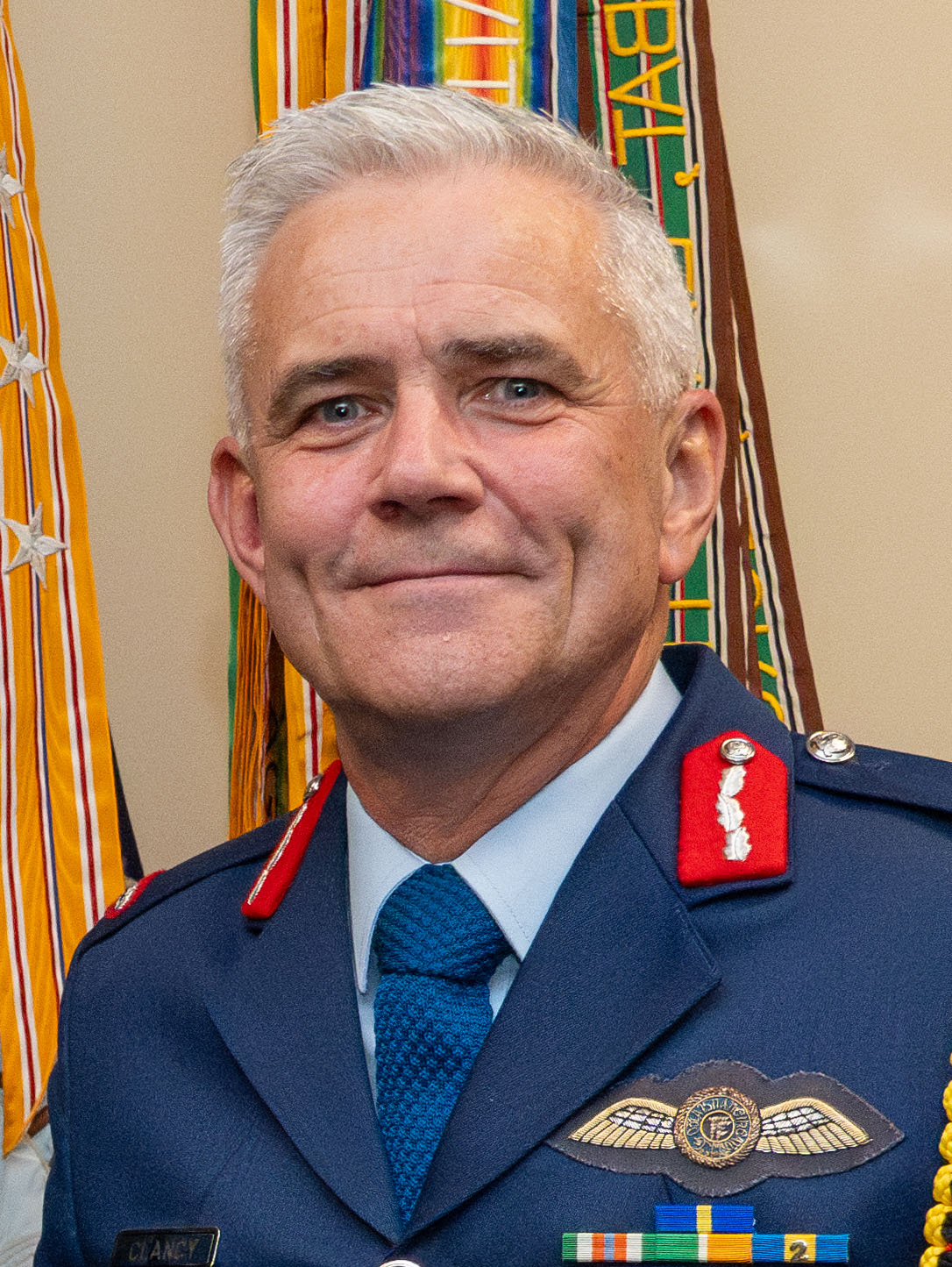
- Incumbent; General Seán Clancy since 1 June 2025
- European Union Military Committee
- Reports to: High Representative
- Seat: Kortenberg building, Brussels, Belgium
- Nominator: European Union Military Committee
- Term length: 3 years
- Formation: December 2000; 25 years ago
- First holder: General Gustav Hägglund
- Website: Official website

The chairman of the European Union Military Committee (abbr. CEUMC) is the four-star rank officer representing and presiding over the European Union's (EU) Military Committee (EUMC), composed of the chiefs of defence (CHODs) of the EU member states. The chairman is selected by the chiefs of defence of the member states and appointed by the members of the Council of the European Union for a three-year term.

== Task ==
The chairman has the following tasks:

- Acting as the spokesperson for the EUMC
- Participating in Political and Security Committee meetings as appropriate
- Acting as the military adviser to the High Representative of the Union for Foreign Affairs and Security Policy (HR) who heads the EEAS European External Action Service
- Representing the primary point of contact with the Operation Commanders of the EU's military operations
- Attending Council meetings with defence and security implications

The relationship between the High Representative, the Military Staff and Military Committee as of November 2017: Colour key:
High Representative (a Vice-President of the Commission)
Military Committee (EUMC; a Council body)
Military Staff (EUMS; a Directorate-General of the External Action Service)

High Representative
Chairman EUMC
Working Group
Working Group/Headline Goal Task Force	Director General EUMS/ Director MPCC
Legal advisor	Deputy Director General	Horizontal Coordination
Assistant Chief of Staff for Synchronisation	EU cell at SHAPE	EU Liaison at the UN in NY	Assistant Chief of Staff for External Relations	NATO Permanent Liaison Team
Concepts & Capabilities; Directorate	Intelligence; Directorate	Operations; Directorate	Logistics; Directorate	Communications & Information Systems; Directorate	Military Planning and Conduct Capability (MPCC) Chief of Staff Working Group Current Operations

=== Role in command and control of missions ===
The EU command and control (C2) structure is directed by political bodies composed of member states' representatives, and generally requires unanimous decisions. As of April 2019:

Liaison: Advice and recommendations Support and monitoring Preparatory work

Political strategic level:^{[5]}
ISS	EUCO Pres. (EUCO)	Chain of command
Coordination/support
SatCen	CIVCOM	HR/VP (FAC)
INTCEN	HR/VP (PMG)	HR/VP (PSC)^{[6]}	CEUMC (EUMC)
CMPD	DGEUMS^{[3]} (EUMS)
Military/civilian strategic level:
Dir MPCC^{[3]} (MPCC)	JSCC	Civ OpCdr CPCC^{[1]}
Operational level:
MFCdr^{[4]} (MFHQ)	HoM^{[1]}
Tactical level:
CC^{[2]}Air; CC^{[2]} Land; CC^{[2]} Mar; Other CCs^{[2]} European Armed Forces

^{1} In the event of a CSDP Civilian Mission also being in the field, the relations with the Civilian Planning and Conduct Capability (CPCC) and its Civilian Operation Commander (Civ OpCdr), as well as the subordinate Head of Mission (HoM), are coordinated as shown.

^{2} Other Component Commanders (CCs) and service branches which may be established.

^{3} The MPCC is part of the EUMS and Dir MPCC is double-hatted as DGEUMS. Unless the MPCC is used as Operation Headquarters (OHQ), either a national OHQ offered by member states or the NATO Command Structure (NCS) would serve this purpose. In the latter instance, Deputy Supreme Allied Commander Europe (DSACEUR), rather than Dir MPCC, would serve as Operation Commander (OpCdr).

^{4} Unless the MPCC is used as Operation Headquarters (OHQ), the MFCdr would be known as a Force Commander (FCdr), and direct a Force Headquarters (FHQ) rather than a MFHQ. Whereas the MFHQ would act both on the operational and tactical level, the FHQ would act purely on the operational level.

^{5} The political strategic level is not part of the C2 structure per se, but represents the political bodies, with associated support facilities, that determine the missions' general direction. The Council determines the role of the High Representative (HR/VP), who serves as Vice-President of the European Commission, attends European Council meetings, chairs the Foreign Affairs Council (FAC) and may chair the Political and Security Committee (PSC) in times of crisis. The HR/VP proposes and implements CSDP decisions.

^{6} Same composition as Committee of Permanent Representatives (COREPER) II, which also prepares for the CSDP-related work of the FAC.

== List of holders ==
No.	Portrait	Name (born–died)	Term of office			Defence branch	Member state	Ref.
No.	Portrait	Name (born–died)	Took office	Left office	Time in office	Defence branch	Member state	Ref.
1	Gustav Hägglund	General; Gustav Hägglund (born 1938)	3 June 2001	9 April 2004	2 years, 311 days	Finnish Army	Finland	
2	Rolando Mosca Moschini	General; Rolando Mosca Moschini (born 1939)	9 April 2004	6 November 2006	2 years, 211 days	Italian Army	Italy	–
3	Henri Bentégeat	General; Henri Bentégeat (born 1946)	6 November 2006	6 November 2009	3 years, 0 days	French Army	France	–
4	Håkan Syrén	General; Håkan Syrén (born 1952)	6 November 2009	6 November 2012	3 years, 0 days	(Sweden) Swedish Amphibious Corps	Sweden	–
5	Patrick de Rousiers	General; Patrick de Rousiers (born 1955)	6 November 2012	6 November 2015	3 years, 0 days	French Air and Space Force	France	
6	Michail Kostarakos	General; Michail Kostarakos (1956–2023)	6 November 2015	6 November 2018	3 years, 0 days	Hellenic Army	Greece	
7	Claudio Graziano	General; Claudio Graziano (1953–2024)	6 November 2018	16 May 2022	3 years, 191 days	Italian Army	Italy	
8	Robert Brieger	General; Robert Brieger (born 1956)	16 May 2022	1 June 2025	3 years, 16 days	Austrian Land Forces	Austria	
9	Seán Clancy	General; Seán Clancy (born 1966)	1 June 2025	Incumbent	1 year, 98 days	Irish Air Corps	Ireland	

== See also ==
- High Representative of the Union for Foreign Affairs and Security Policy
- Director General of the European Union Military Staff
- Chairman of the NATO Military Committee
- Supreme Allied Commander Europe
