= Director General of the European Union Military Staff =

Head of the European Union Military Staff

- EUMS coat of arms

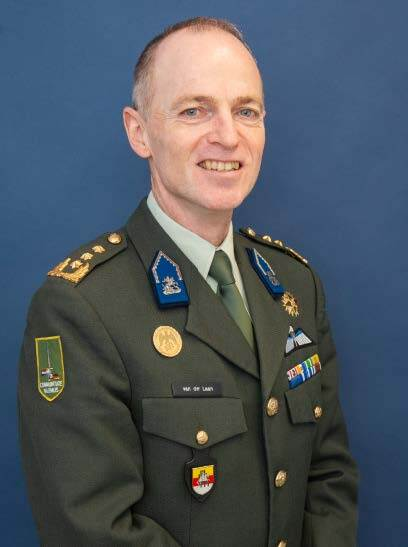
- Incumbent; Lieutenant General Michiel van der Laan since 28 June 2023
- European Union Military Staff
- Reports to: High Representative, Military Committee
- Seat: Kortenberg building, Brussels, Belgium
- Term length: 3 or 4 years
- Formation: 11 June 2001; 25 years ago
- First holder: Rainer Schuwirth
- Deputy: Deputy Director General of the European Union Military Staff
- Website: eeas.europa.eu

The Director General of the European Union Military Staff (abbr. DGEUMS) is the head of the European Union Military Staff (EUMS) who also serves as Director of the Military Planning and Conduct Capability (abbr. Dir MPCC). This position, which was established in 2001, is held by a three-star general. The current holder is lieutenant general Michiel van der Laan, occupying the position since June 2023.

== Task ==
The Director General is responsible for the EUMS' work in providing strategic advice to the High Representative (HR), reporting to the European Union Military Committee (EUMC) - representing member states' Chiefs of Defence - and performing "early warning", situation assessment and strategic planning.

Since 2017 the DGEUMS has served as Director of the Military Planning and Conduct Capability (MPCC), and assumes the function of the single commander for all non-executive military missions of the European Union (EU). The DGEUMS exercises command and control over the current three training Missions and other possible future operations. Presently the MPCC may only run non-executive operations. By the end of 2020 the MPCC will be capable of running executive operations of up to 2,500 troops, i.e. the size of one battle group.

=== Relation with the rest of the Military Staff, the High Representative and Military Committee ===
The relationship between the High Representative, the Military Staff and Military Committee as of November 2017: Colour key:
High Representative (a Vice-President of the Commission)
Military Committee (EUMC; a Council body)
Military Staff (EUMS; a Directorate-General of the External Action Service)

High Representative
Chairman EUMC
Working Group
Working Group/Headline Goal Task Force	Director General EUMS/ Director MPCC
Legal advisor	Deputy Director General	Horizontal Coordination
Assistant Chief of Staff for Synchronisation	EU cell at SHAPE	EU Liaison at the UN in NY	Assistant Chief of Staff for External Relations	NATO Permanent Liaison Team
Concepts & Capabilities; Directorate	Intelligence; Directorate	Operations; Directorate	Logistics; Directorate	Communications & Information Systems; Directorate	Military Planning and Conduct Capability (MPCC) Chief of Staff Working Group Current Operations

=== Role in the command and control structure ===
The EU command and control (C2) structure is directed by political bodies composed of member states' representatives, and generally requires unanimous decisions. As of April 2019:

Liaison: Advice and recommendations Support and monitoring Preparatory work

Political strategic level:^{[5]}
ISS	EUCO Pres. (EUCO)	Chain of command
Coordination/support
SatCen	CIVCOM	HR/VP (FAC)
INTCEN	HR/VP (PMG)	HR/VP (PSC)^{[6]}	CEUMC (EUMC)
CMPD	DGEUMS^{[3]} (EUMS)
Military/civilian strategic level:
Dir MPCC^{[3]} (MPCC)	JSCC	Civ OpCdr CPCC^{[1]}
Operational level:
MFCdr^{[4]} (MFHQ)	HoM^{[1]}
Tactical level:
CC^{[2]}Air; CC^{[2]} Land; CC^{[2]} Mar; Other CCs^{[2]} European Armed Forces

^{1} In the event of a CSDP Civilian Mission also being in the field, the relations with the Civilian Planning and Conduct Capability (CPCC) and its Civilian Operation Commander (Civ OpCdr), as well as the subordinate Head of Mission (HoM), are coordinated as shown.

^{2} Other Component Commanders (CCs) and service branches which may be established.

^{3} The MPCC is part of the EUMS and Dir MPCC is double-hatted as DGEUMS. Unless the MPCC is used as Operation Headquarters (OHQ), either a national OHQ offered by member states or the NATO Command Structure (NCS) would serve this purpose. In the latter instance, Deputy Supreme Allied Commander Europe (DSACEUR), rather than Dir MPCC, would serve as Operation Commander (OpCdr).

^{4} Unless the MPCC is used as Operation Headquarters (OHQ), the MFCdr would be known as a Force Commander (FCdr), and direct a Force Headquarters (FHQ) rather than a MFHQ. Whereas the MFHQ would act both on the operational and tactical level, the FHQ would act purely on the operational level.

^{5} The political strategic level is not part of the C2 structure per se, but represents the political bodies, with associated support facilities, that determine the missions' general direction. The Council determines the role of the High Representative (HR/VP), who serves as Vice-President of the European Commission, attends European Council meetings, chairs the Foreign Affairs Council (FAC) and may chair the Political and Security Committee (PSC) in times of crisis. The HR/VP proposes and implements CSDP decisions.

^{6} Same composition as Committee of Permanent Representatives (COREPER) II, which also prepares for the CSDP-related work of the FAC.

== List of holders ==
No.	Portrait	Director General	Took office	Left office	Time in office	Defence branch	Nationality
1	Rainer Schuwirth [de]	Lieutenant General; Rainer Schuwirth (born 1945)	11 June 2001	1 March 2004	2 years, 264 days	German Army	Germany
2	Jean-Paul Perruche	Lieutenant General; Jean-Paul Perruche (born 1947)	1 March 2004	28 February 2007	2 years, 364 days	French Army	France
3	David Leakey	Lieutenant General; David Leakey (born 1952)	1 March 2007	28 May 2010	3 years, 88 days	British Army	United Kingdom
4	Ton van Osch	Lieutenant General; Ton van Osch (born 1955)	28 May 2010	28 May 2013	3 years, 0 days	Royal Netherlands Army	Netherlands
5	Wolfgang Wosolsobe	Lieutenant General; Wolfgang Wosolsobe (1955–2018)	28 May 2013	1 May 2016	2 years, 339 days	Austrian Land Forces	Austria
6	Esa Pulkkinen	Lieutenant General; Esa Pulkkinen (born 1957)	1 May 2016	30 June 2020	4 years, 60 days	Finnish Army	Finland
7	Hervé Bléjean	Vice Admiral; Hervé Bléjean (born 1963)	30 June 2020	28 June 2023	2 years, 363 days	French Navy	France
8	Michiel van der Laan	Lieutenant General; Michiel van der Laan (born 1965)	28 June 2023	Incumbent	3 years, 71 days	Royal Netherlands Army	Netherlands

== Deputy ==
The DGEUMS is assisted by the Deputy Director General and the Chief of Staff (DDG/COS, a two-star general).

List of Deputy Directors General
Name	Photo	Nationality	Term began	Term ended
Rear Admiral Bruce Williams		United Kingdom	2011	2015
Rear Admiral Waldemar Głuszko		Poland	2015	2017
Major General Giovanni Manione		Italy	2017	2022
Major General Gábor Horváth		Hungary	2022	

== See also ==
- High Representative of the Union for Foreign Affairs and Security Policy
- Chairman of the European Union Military Committee
- Chairman of the NATO Military Committee
- Supreme Allied Commander Europe
- Director of the Civilian Planning and Conduct Capability
