= European Union Satellite Centre =

Provides data consolidated from EU space-based assets

- SatCen

Agency overview
- Formed: 1 June 1992 (as the Western European Union Satellite Centre); 1 January 2002 (as an EU agency)
- Jurisdiction: European Union
- Headquarters: Apdo de Correos 511 E Torrejón de Ardoz, Madrid Spain; 40.489525°N 3.43863°W
- Agency executives: Sorin Ducaru, Director; Rear Admiral Louis Tillier, Deputy Director
- Key document: Council Decision 2014/401/CFSP
- Website: www.satcen.europa.eu

The European Union Satellite Centre (EU SatCen; previously EUSC) is the agency of the European Union (EU) that supports the EU's decision-making in the field of the Common Foreign and Security Policy (CFSP), including crisis management missions and operations. It provides products and services resulting from the exploitation of relevant space assets and collateral data, including satellite and aerial imagery, and related services. SatCen is headquartered in the Torrejón Air Base, located in the Spanish municipality of the same name, in the vicinity of Madrid.

The staff of the centre, headed by Director Sorin Dumitru Ducaru, consists of experienced image analysts, geospatial specialists and supporting personnel, recruited from EU Member States. Experts seconded from Member States work at the SatCen for periods ranging from six months to three years. Temporary staff are recruited as needed. SatCen assures technical development activities in direct support to its operational activities, as well as specialised training for image analysts.

== History ==
The SatCen was founded in 1992 as the Western European Union Satellite Centre. It was incorporated as an EU agency on 1 January 2002.

In June 2014, a new Council Decision replaced the former Council Joint Action of 2001 to modify SatCen's mission, aligning it with the evolution of the user demand and the developments of the EU's space activities relevant to CFSP (ref. 1), making it an essential interface with the European Geospatial Intelligence (GEOINT, ref. 2) community.

Ducaru became Director of SatCen in June 2019.

== Production and users ==
In 2015, SatCen provided 1,348 products for the benefit of a large community of users, such as the European External Action Service in general, but especially the EU Military Staff, the EU Intelligence Analysis Centre and the Civil Planning and Conduct Capability, as well as EU member states and international organisations.

The EU command and control (C2) structure is directed by political bodies composed of member states' representatives, and generally requires unanimous decisions. As of April 2019:

Liaison: Advice and recommendations Support and monitoring Preparatory work

Political strategic level:^{[5]}
ISS	EUCO Pres. (EUCO)	Chain of command
Coordination/support
SatCen	CIVCOM	HR/VP (FAC)
INTCEN	HR/VP (PMG)	HR/VP (PSC)^{[6]}	CEUMC (EUMC)
CMPD	DGEUMS^{[3]} (EUMS)
Military/civilian strategic level:
Dir MPCC^{[3]} (MPCC)	JSCC	Civ OpCdr CPCC^{[1]}
Operational level:
MFCdr^{[4]} (MFHQ)	HoM^{[1]}
Tactical level:
CC^{[2]}Air; CC^{[2]} Land; CC^{[2]} Mar; Other CCs^{[2]} European Armed Forces

^{1} In the event of a CSDP Civilian Mission also being in the field, the relations with the Civilian Planning and Conduct Capability (CPCC) and its Civilian Operation Commander (Civ OpCdr), as well as the subordinate Head of Mission (HoM), are coordinated as shown.

^{2} Other Component Commanders (CCs) and service branches which may be established.

^{3} The MPCC is part of the EUMS and Dir MPCC is double-hatted as DGEUMS. Unless the MPCC is used as Operation Headquarters (OHQ), either a national OHQ offered by member states or the NATO Command Structure (NCS) would serve this purpose. In the latter instance, Deputy Supreme Allied Commander Europe (DSACEUR), rather than Dir MPCC, would serve as Operation Commander (OpCdr).

^{4} Unless the MPCC is used as Operation Headquarters (OHQ), the MFCdr would be known as a Force Commander (FCdr), and direct a Force Headquarters (FHQ) rather than a MFHQ. Whereas the MFHQ would act both on the operational and tactical level, the FHQ would act purely on the operational level.

^{5} The political strategic level is not part of the C2 structure per se, but represents the political bodies, with associated support facilities, that determine the missions' general direction. The Council determines the role of the High Representative (HR/VP), who serves as Vice-President of the European Commission, attends European Council meetings, chairs the Foreign Affairs Council (FAC) and may chair the Political and Security Committee (PSC) in times of crisis. The HR/VP proposes and implements CSDP decisions.

^{6} Same composition as Committee of Permanent Representatives (COREPER) II, which also prepares for the CSDP-related work of the FAC.

== See also ==
- Common Security and Defence Policy
- European Defence Agency
- European External Action Service
- European Union Institute for Security Studies
- Joint European Union Intelligence School
- Military of the European Union
- Western European Union
