= Civilian Operations Headquarters =

The Civilian Operations Headquarters (CivOpsHQ) is the headquarters of the European Union's civilian Common Security and Defence Policy (CSDP) missions, and a managing directorate of the European External Action Service (EEAS). The headquarters was launched by a decision of the High Representative (HR/VP) Kaja Kallas in March 2025 to “meet the demands of a deteriorating global security environment”. The CivOpsHQ superseded the former Civilian Planning and Conduct Capability (CPCC), originally established in 2007.

The CivOpsHQ is tasked to support the Civilian Operations Commander (CivOpsCdr) with the command and control over the EU's civilian CSDP missions, establish operational standards, formulate human resources policies and oversee duty of care of the missions.

== Managing Director ==
The CivOpsHQ Managing Director, as Civilian Operations Commander (CivOpsCdr), exercises command and control at strategic level for the operational planning and conduct of all civilian crisis management operations. The CivOpsCdr is assisted by a staff of approximately 120 policy experts.

== Divisions ==
At the time of its establishment in March 2025, the Civilian Operations Headquarters in Brussels consisted of five administrative divisions:

- CivOpsHQ.1 - Horizontal topics and concepts

This Division's role is the drafting of operational concepts for the civilian, and support for implementation. The Division also oversees implementation of the EU “Civilian CSDP Compact”, improves knowledge management and maintains partnerships with non-EU actors.

- CivOpsHQ.2 – Operations

This Division is in charge of the planning and operational conduct of EU civilian missions, functioning as the main point of contact between the Civilian Operations Headquarters and the Missions.

- CivOpsHQ.3 – Personnel

This Division conducts human resources for the EU civilian missions and supports the missions to recruit and manage staff to achieve the missions mandate goals.

- CivOpsHQ.4 – Support

This Division provides support services to the EU civilian missions, from logistics and budgetary matters to communication and information systems, IT and cybersecurity.

- CivOpsHQ.5 – Security and health

This Division is responsible for enhancing the duty of care for the civilian CSDP Missions.
