= Political and Security Committee =

Permanent body within the European Union

The Political and Security Committee (PSC; sometimes referred to by its French COPS acronym derived from Comité politique et de sécurité) is a permanent body within the European Union (EU) dealing with Common Foreign and Security Policy issues, including Common Security and Defence Policy.

The PSC, which is based in Brussels, consists of ambassadorial-level representatives from all the EU member states and usually meets twice per week. The PSC is chaired by the European External Action Service (EEAS).

== Functions ==
The main functions of the PSC are keeping track of the international situation, and helping to define EU policies within the CFSP and CSDP. PSC sends guidance to, and receives advice from the European Union Military Committee (EUMC), the Committee for Civilian Aspects of Crisis Management (CIVCOM) as well as the European Union Institute for Security Studies. It is also a forum for dialogue on CSDP matters between the EU Member States.

The PSC drafts opinions for the Foreign Affairs Council, which is one of the configurations of the Council of the European Union. CFSP matters are passed to the Foreign Affairs Council via COREPER II.

=== Role in command and control of missions ===
The EU command and control (C2) structure is directed by political bodies composed of member states' representatives, and generally requires unanimous decisions. As of April 2019:

Liaison: Advice and recommendations Support and monitoring Preparatory work

Political strategic level:^{[5]}
ISS	EUCO Pres. (EUCO)	Chain of command
Coordination/support
SatCen	CIVCOM	HR/VP (FAC)
INTCEN	HR/VP (PMG)	HR/VP (PSC)^{[6]}	CEUMC (EUMC)
CMPD	DGEUMS^{[3]} (EUMS)
Military/civilian strategic level:
Dir MPCC^{[3]} (MPCC)	JSCC	Civ OpCdr CPCC^{[1]}
Operational level:
MFCdr^{[4]} (MFHQ)	HoM^{[1]}
Tactical level:
CC^{[2]}Air; CC^{[2]} Land; CC^{[2]} Mar; Other CCs^{[2]} European Armed Forces

^{1} In the event of a CSDP Civilian Mission also being in the field, the relations with the Civilian Planning and Conduct Capability (CPCC) and its Civilian Operation Commander (Civ OpCdr), as well as the subordinate Head of Mission (HoM), are coordinated as shown.

^{2} Other Component Commanders (CCs) and service branches which may be established.

^{3} The MPCC is part of the EUMS and Dir MPCC is double-hatted as DGEUMS. Unless the MPCC is used as Operation Headquarters (OHQ), either a national OHQ offered by member states or the NATO Command Structure (NCS) would serve this purpose. In the latter instance, Deputy Supreme Allied Commander Europe (DSACEUR), rather than Dir MPCC, would serve as Operation Commander (OpCdr).

^{4} Unless the MPCC is used as Operation Headquarters (OHQ), the MFCdr would be known as a Force Commander (FCdr), and direct a Force Headquarters (FHQ) rather than a MFHQ. Whereas the MFHQ would act both on the operational and tactical level, the FHQ would act purely on the operational level.

^{5} The political strategic level is not part of the C2 structure per se, but represents the political bodies, with associated support facilities, that determine the missions' general direction. The Council determines the role of the High Representative (HR/VP), who serves as Vice-President of the European Commission, attends European Council meetings, chairs the Foreign Affairs Council (FAC) and may chair the Political and Security Committee (PSC) in times of crisis. The HR/VP proposes and implements CSDP decisions.

^{6} Same composition as Committee of Permanent Representatives (COREPER) II, which also prepares for the CSDP-related work of the FAC.

== History ==
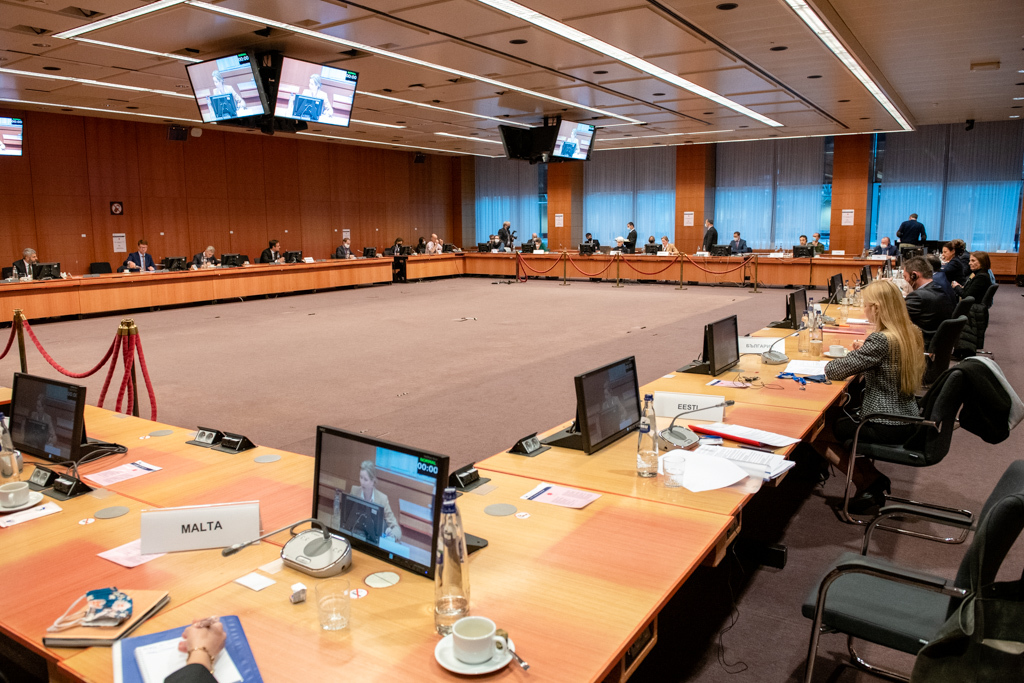
The Political and Security Committee meets in January 2022 to discuss the 2021–2022 Russo-Ukrainian crisis

The creation of the PSC was a result of the Treaty of Amsterdam, after which the establishment of the PSC was agreed in principle in December 1999, at the Helsinki European Council. PSC was first established as an interim body in 2000. In December 2000, at the Nice European Council it was agreed to make it permanent. The formal decision to set up the PSC was taken on January 22, 2001, by the Council of the European Union.

The PSC replaced the previous Political Committee, which met less frequently, and consisted of representatives from the Member States' capitals rather than Brussels-based ambassadors.

On 22 March 2021, the committee was sanctioned by the Chinese government after the European Union imposed sanctions on China over Xinjiang.

== Chair ==
In 2010 Ambassador Olof Skoog (Sweden) was appointed by the EU High Representative Catherine Ashton to serve as the first Permanent Chair of the EU Political and Security Committee. He served until September 2013 when he was replaced by Walter Stevens (Belgium).

== See also ==
- Common Security and Defence Policy
- European External Action Service
- Military of the European Union
- European Union Military Committee
- European Union Military Staff
