= European Union Institute for Security Studies =

Agency of the European Union

European Union Institute for Security Studies (EUISS)

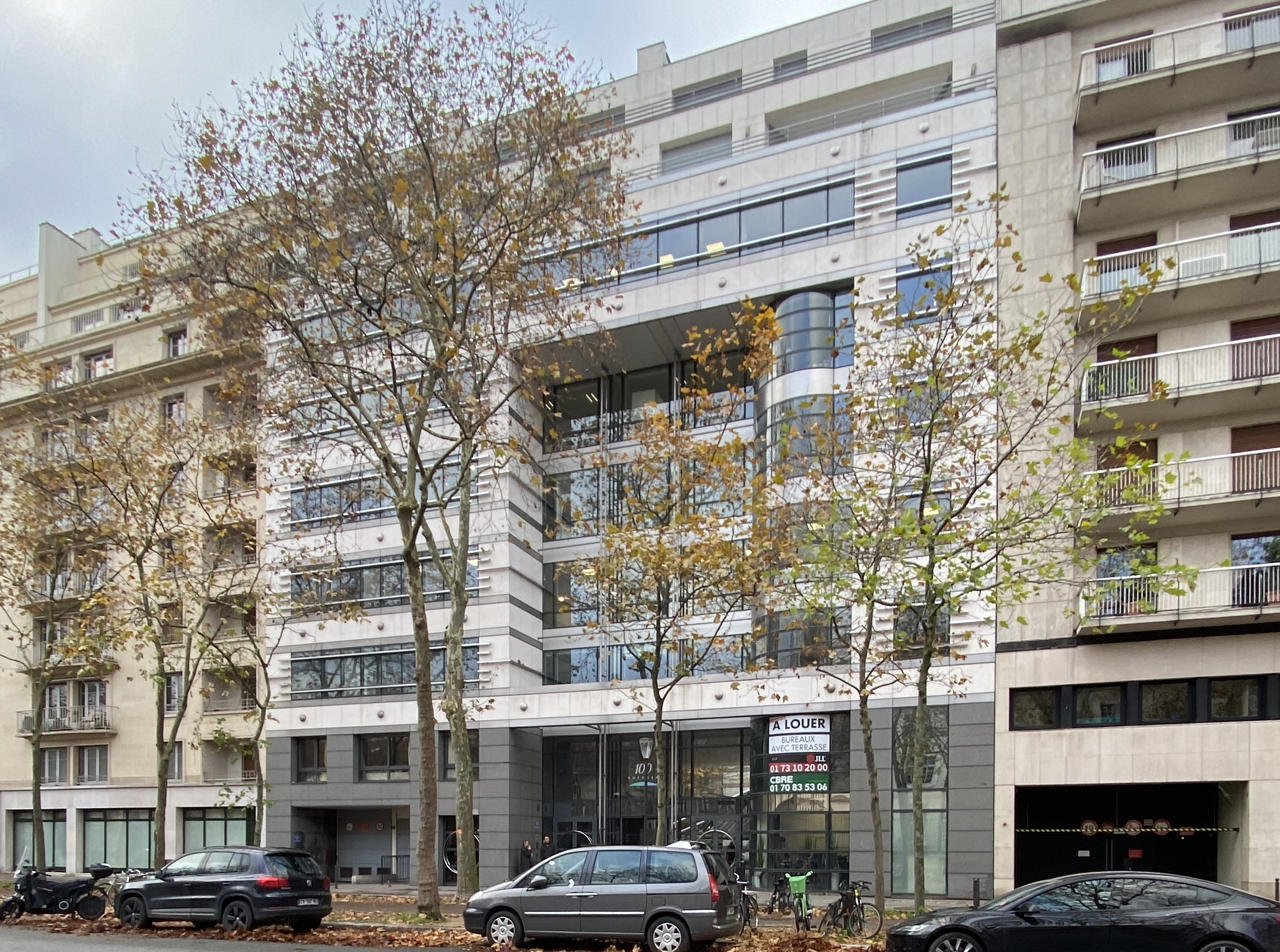
- Building at 100, Avenue de Suffren in Paris, seat of the EUISS

Agency overview
- Formed: 13 November 1989 (as the Western European Union Institute for Security Studies); 20 July 2001 (as an EU agency)
- Jurisdiction: European Union
- Headquarters: Paris, France
- Agency executive: Steven Everts, Director
- Key document: Council Decision 2014/75/CFSP
- Website: www.iss.europa.eu

Map
- European Union Institute for Security Studies (European Union)

The European Union Institute for Security Studies (EUISS) is an agency of the European Union (EU) serving as the EU's in-house foreign and security policy think tank, associated with the Common Foreign and Security Policy. It is based in Paris and has full intellectual freedom, guaranteed within its legal basis as established by the Council of the European Union. Its core mission is to provide analysis on foreign, security and defence policy issues to inform the EU's strategic choices. It organise discussion forums to help formulate EU policy. It also acts as an interface between European experts and decision makers.

== History ==
The EUISS was originally the Western European Union Institute for Security Studies (WEU-ISS). It opened in Paris in 1990 to provide an intellectual asset to European defence which had not yet existed, including within NATO. A year later, in 1991, the Western European Union (WEU) Satellite Centre was opened at Torréjon de Ardoz near Madrid (now the EU SatCen). Both of these WEU institutions were to be later transferred to the EU under the emerging Common Security and Defence Policy.

Under the WEU, some of the first European-led military operations were organised. In 1987-88 during the Iran-Iraq war, and in 1990-91 after Iraq's invasion of Kuwait, the WEU coordinated the work of European vessels in mine-clearing in the Gulf to ensure the safety of shipping. Its mandate, in the second case, included helping to enforce UN sanctions and it also contributed to the humanitarian actions for Kurdish refugees in Northern Iraq. Planning for the WEU's role in the Gulf triggered the first ever meeting of Chiefs of Defence of WEU nations, held in Paris in August 1990. This informed the first academic publication of the then WEU Institute for Security Studies, namely Western Europe and the Gulf (WEU-ISS: Paris, 1992), edited by Nicole Gnesotto and John Roper.

In 1999, as the EU sought to bring various parts of the WEU secretariat under its responsibility, including the Institute for Security Studies, it was agreed that the Institute would bring with it the work it had undertaken on the WEU's former 'transatlantic dialogue' on European defence and relations with the US & Canada.

After a short period of dormancy, the new EU Institute for Security Studies was inaugurated on 1 January 2002, following a Council decision dated to 20 July 2001. Its seat was maintained in Paris, in spite of discussions to transfer to Brussels (subsequently a liaison office has been created), which also has enabled a strong degree of intellectual autonomy to be maintained.

== Mission ==
As per the Council Joint Action of 20 July 2001 on the establishment of a European Union Institute for Security Studies, the mission of the EUISS is provided as follows:

The Institute shall contribute to the development of the CFSP, including the ESDP, by conducting academic research and analysis in relevant fields. To that end, it shall, inter alia, produce and, on an ad hoc basis, commission research papers, arrange seminars, enrich the transatlantic dialogue by organising activities similar to those of the WEU Transatlantic Forum and maintain a network of exchanges with other research institutes and think-tanks both inside and outside the European Union. The Institute's work shall involve this network as broadly as possible. The Institute's output shall be distributed as widely as possible, except as regards confidential information, for which the Council security regulations as set out in Decision 2001/264/EC(1) shall apply.

The text also provides that the Institute shall enjoy full intellectual independence in carrying out its research and seminar activities.

The EUISS conducts research and analysis to provide policymakers, principally within the EU but also for those from Member States, with a clear and comprehensive understanding of the global security landscape. Based upon the information it has gathered, it may offer policy-relevant recommendations to shape effective EU foreign, security and defence policies. It also serves as a bridge between the world of ideas (the think tank and scholarly community) and the European and national administrations which it advises.

== Activities ==
EUISS produces policy-oriented analysis through publications and events. The institute's flagship publication is the Chaillot Paper series, complemented by shorter policy Briefs and news-driven Commentaries.

EUISS events bring together EU officials, national experts, academics, decision-makers, media, and civil society representatives from both EU Member States and the wider world. These events aim to foster dialogue, enhance analytical capacity and shape common approaches.

=== Research ===
The EUISS researches topics related to the Common Foreign and Security Policy (CFSP), including the Common Security and Defence Policy (CSDP). The Institute covers EU relations with the following regions: Africa, Asia, Middle East, Russia and eastern neighbours, transatlantic relations and Latin America, and Western Balkans.

In addition to these geographical regions, the EUISS addresses different thematic areas such as security and defence, cybersecurity, conflict prevention, crisis management, global governance, economic security, transnational security, foreign information manipulation and interference (FIMI).

== Governance and Organisation ==
The EUISS operates under the political supervision of the Political and Security Committee, without infringement to the Institute's intellectual independence.

The Institute is administrated by a Director whose responsibilities including the annual work programme, selection of personnel, budgetary management, relations with relevant stakeholders and ensuring close collaboration with EU, national and international institutions in related fields.

The institute is funded by member states of the European Union, according to a GNP-based cost-sharing formula.

The Director is accountable to the Board of the Institute, chaired ex officio by the High Representative of the Union for Foreign Affairs and Security Policy, currently Kaja Kallas (since 2024), and composed of one representative appointed by each EU Member State and the European Commission.

=== Directors ===
==== WEU-ISS ====
- 1990-1995: John Roper
- 1995-1999: Guido Lenzi
- 1999-2001: Nicole Gnesotto

==== EUISS ====
- 2002-2006: Nicole Gnesotto
- 2007-2012: Álvaro de Vasconcelos
- 2012-2017: Antonio Missiroli
- 2018-2023: Gustav Lindstrom
- 2023-present: Steven Everts

== European Strategy and Policy Analysis System ==
In 2011, the EUISS, in its role as the European agency for strategic studies, was chosen by the European Commission to prepare and deliver the final reports of the European Strategy and Policy Analysis System (ESPAS).

== See also ==
- Chaillot Papers
- Common Foreign and Security Policy
- European Defence Agency
- European External Action Service
- European Security and Defence College
- European Union Satellite Centre
- Joint European Union Intelligence School
- List of think tanks
- Western European Union
