= Committee of Permanent Representatives =

European Union committee

COREPER, from French Comité des représentants permanents, is the Committee of Permanent Representatives in the European Union, made up of the head or deputy head of mission from the EU member states in Brussels.

COREPER's defined role is to prepare the agenda for the ministerial Council of the European Union meetings; it may also take some procedural decisions. It oversees and coordinates the work of some 250 committees and working parties made up of civil servants from the member states who work on issues at the technical level to be discussed later by COREPER and the Council. In turn, COREPER's agenda is prepared by two bodies known as the Mertens Group and Antici Group, depending on the configuration.

The COREPER is chaired by the Presidency of the Council of the European Union.

== History ==
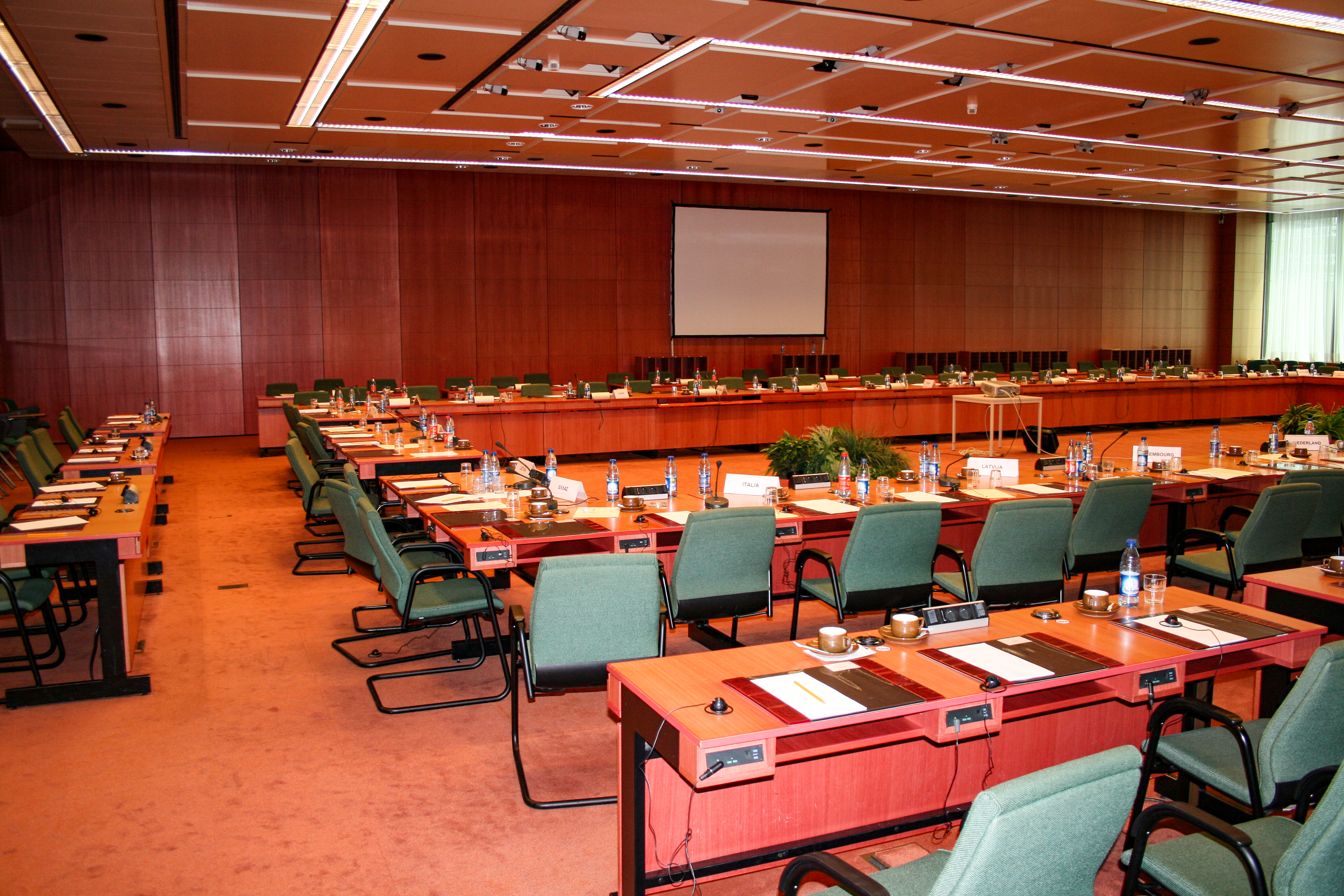
COREPER meeting room in the Council's Justus Lipsius building, 2007

COREPER was formalised as a preparatory body in the Merger Treaty and the Treaty of Luxembourg, in force 1967 and 1971, respectively.

== Organisations and Tasks ==
Article 240 of the Treaty on the functioning of the European Union lays down the legal basis of COREPER.

There are in fact two committees within the COREPER:

- COREPER I consists of deputy heads of mission and deals largely with social and economic issues;
- COREPER II consists of heads of mission (Ambassador Extraordinary and Plenipotentiary) and deals largely with political, financial and foreign policy issues.

Coreper I, comprising the Deputy Permanent Representatives, prepares the ground for the following Council configurations:

- Employment, Social Policy, Health and Consumer Affairs;
- Competitiveness (internal market, industry, research, space and tourism);
- Transport, Telecommunications and Energy;
- Agriculture and Fisheries;
- Environment;
- Education, Youth, Culture and Sport (including audiovisual);

Coreper II, comprising the Permanent Representatives, prepares for the other configurations:

- General Affairs
- Foreign Affairs (including European security and defence policy and development cooperation);
- Economic and Financial Affairs (including the budget);
- Justice and Home Affairs (including civil protection).

Representatives of the Council Secretariat from the relevant Directorates and from the Legal Directorate are also present.

Both Coreper I and Coreper II are, in turn, prepared by two other groups of high ranking diplomats. Coreper I is prepared by the Mertens Group, while Coreper II is prepared by the Antici Group.

Weekly meetings are held in private; the agenda of the meeting is divided into

- a part "I" (I points, items scheduled without debate) and
- a part "II" (II points, items scheduled for debate).

They divide the ministerial agenda into three categories:

- I points which are for information and no ministerial decision is needed;
- A points where the decision can be made without debate (but it has to be put off the agenda of this meeting if any national delegation opposes it being decided) and is often on a subject outside the detailed responsibility of the particular group of ministers;
- B points where debate is needed, and the decision may not be known in advance.

An item may be described internally as a false B point - this is to give the public impression as a B point that ministers are actively debating it because of its importance when in fact it could have been treated as an A point because negotiation and compromise has already taken place in COREPER. Relatively few decisions are taken by ministers on true B points: they are usually sent back to COREPER until they can be returned as an A point or a false B point.

The deliberations and decisions of the Council itself under the co-decision procedure are, unlike all other Council meetings, including COREPER and Council working group meetings, public.

== See also ==
- Special Committee on Agriculture (SCA)
- Horizontal Working Party on Drugs (HDG)
