= History of the Common Security and Defence Policy =

This article outlines the history of the Common Security and Defence Policy (CSDP) of the European Union (EU), a part of the Common Foreign and Security Policy (CFSP).

The post-war period saw several short-lived or ill-fated initiatives for European defence integration intended to protect against potential Soviet or German aggression: The Western Union and the proposed European Defence Community were respectively cannibalised by the North Atlantic Treaty Organisation (NATO) and rejected by the French Parliament. The largely dormant Western European Union (WEU) succeeded the Western Union's remainder in 1954. In 1970 the European Political Co-operation (EPC) brought about the European Communities' initial foreign policy coordination, which in turn was replaced by the newly founded EU's CFSP pillar in 1993. The WEU was reactivated in 1984 and given new tasks, and in 1996 NATO agreed to let it develop a European Security and Defence Identity (ESDI). The 1998 St. Malo declaration signalled that the traditionally hesitant United Kingdom was prepared to provide the EU with autonomous defence structures. This facilitated the transformation of the ESDI into the European Security and Defence Policy (ESDP) in 1999, when it was transferred to the EU. In 2003 the EU deployed its first CSDP missions, and adopted the European Security Strategy identifying common threats and objectives. In 2009, the Treaty of Lisbon introduced the present name, CSDP, while establishing the EEAS, the mutual defence clause and enabling a subset of member states to pursue defence integration within PESCO. In 2011 the WEU, whose tasks had been transferred to the EU, was dissolved. In 2016 a new security strategy was introduced, which along with the Russian annexation of Crimea, the scheduled British withdrawal from the EU and the election of Trump as US President have given the CSDP a new impetus.

== Origins ==
Towards the end of World War II, the There Allied Powers discussed during the Tehran Conference and the ensuing 1943 Moscow Conference the plans to establish joint institutions. This led to a decision at the Yalta Conference in 1944 to include Free France as the Fourth Allied Power and to form a European Advisory Commission, later replaced by the Council of Foreign Ministers and the Allied Control Council, following the German surrender and the Potsdam Agreement in 1945.

The growing rift among the Four Powers became evident as a result of the rigged 1947 Polish legislative election which constituted an open breach of the Yalta Agreement, followed by the announcement of the Truman Doctrine on 12 March 1947. On 4 March 1947 France and the United Kingdom signed the Treaty of Dunkirk for mutual assistance in the event of future military aggression in the aftermath of World War II against any of the pair. The rationale for the treaty was the threat of a potential future military attack, specifically a Soviet one in practice, though publicised under the disguise of a German one, according to the official statements. The treaty entered into force on 8 September 1947. Immediately following the February 1948 coup d'état by the Communist Party of Czechoslovakia, the London Six-Power Conference was held, resulting in the Soviet boycott of the Allied Control Council and its incapacitation, an event marking the beginning of the Cold War. The remainder of the year 1948 marked the beginning of the institutionalised modern European integration.

== 1948–1954: Western Union, its Defence Organisation and failure of the European Defence Community ==
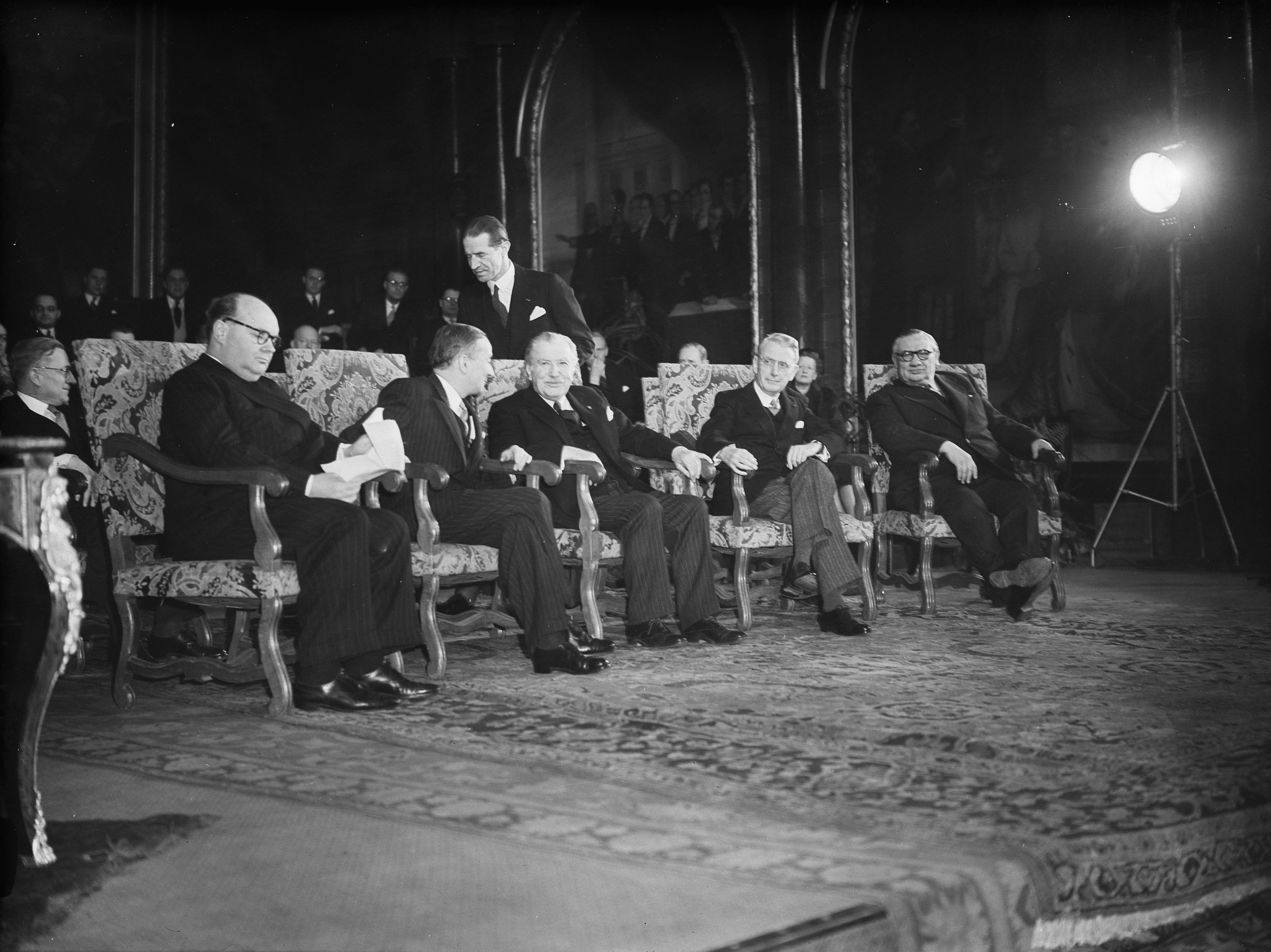
Foreign ministers of the five European powers at the signing of the Treaty of Brussels

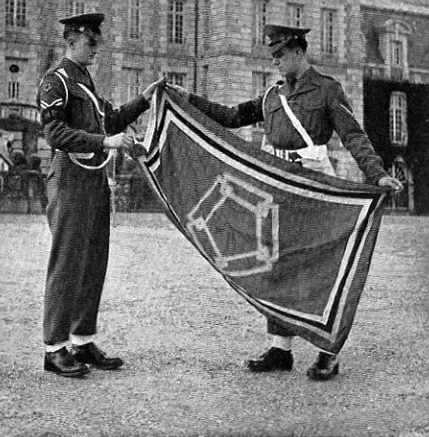
British military police displaying the Western Union Standard

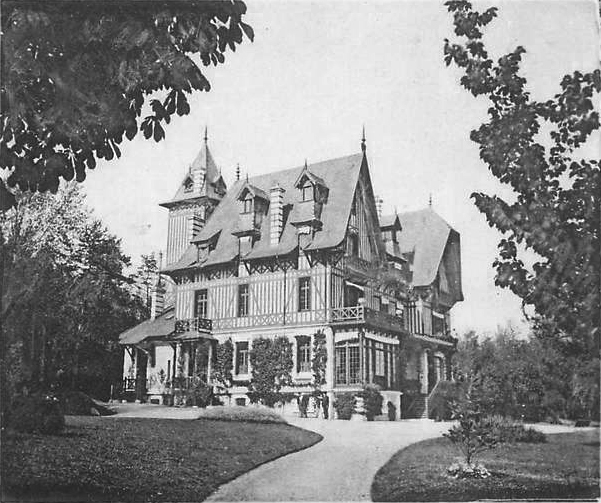
The high-level headquarters of Chairman Montgomery of the Western Union C-in-C Committee, situated in Château des Fougères in Fontainebleau's neighbouring commune Avon

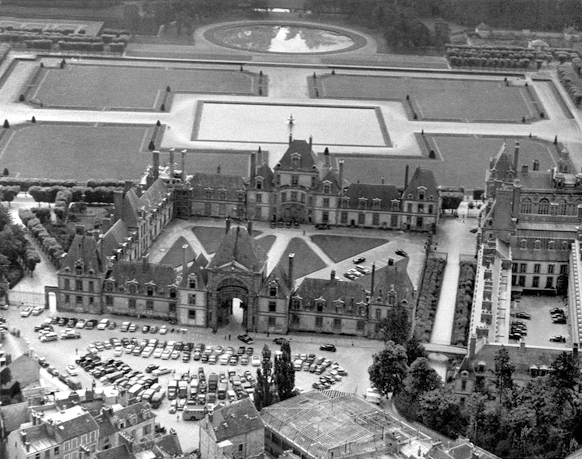
Western Union air, sea and land commands, situated in the Henry IV quarter at the Palace of Fontainebleau

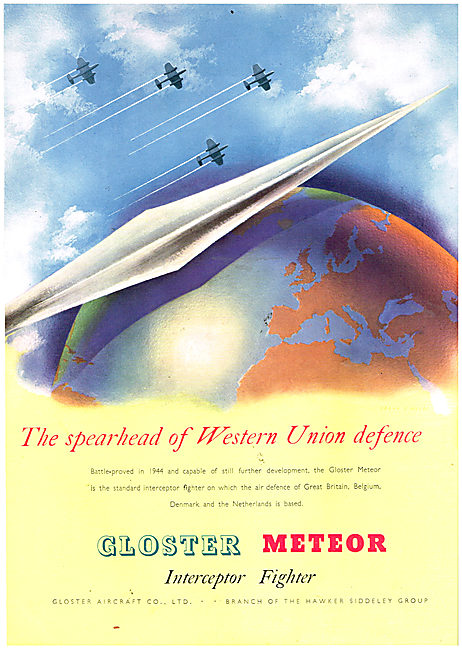
1949 poster advertising the Gloster Meteor jet fighter as the spearhead of Western Union defence

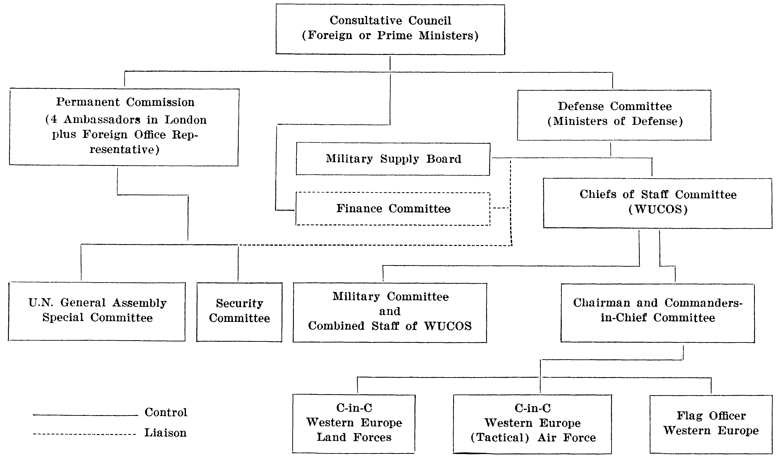
Organigramme of the Western Union

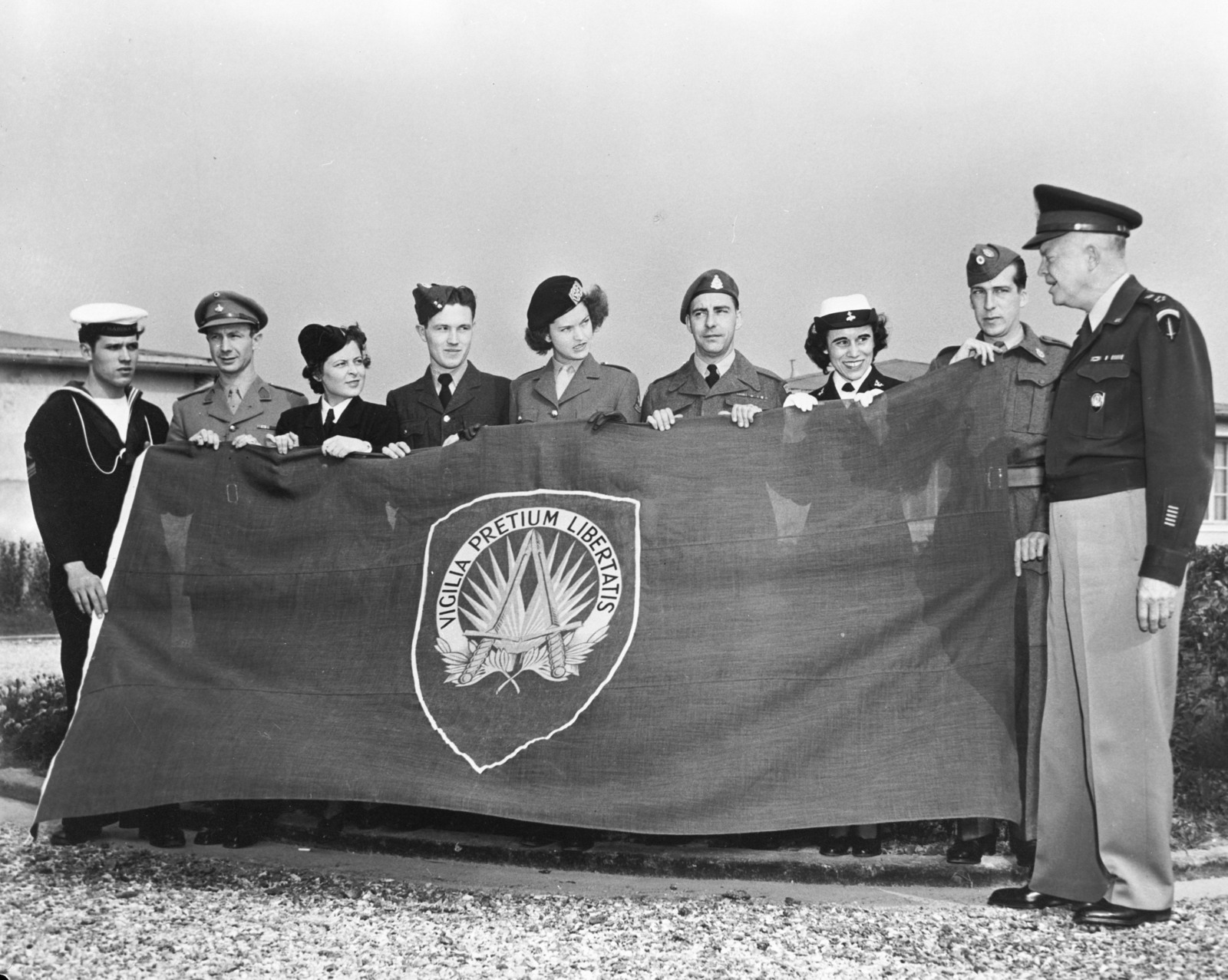
Eisenhower, who served as Supreme Allied Commander Europe, depicted on 8 October 1951 in front of the flag of NATO's Supreme Headquarters Allied Powers Europe (SHAPE). WUDO's plans, structures and responsibility of defending Western Europe were transferred to SHAPE.

Organisational chart planned for the EDC, including relations to NATO, with specific reference to the North Atlantic Council and the Supreme Allied Commander Europe (SACEUR)

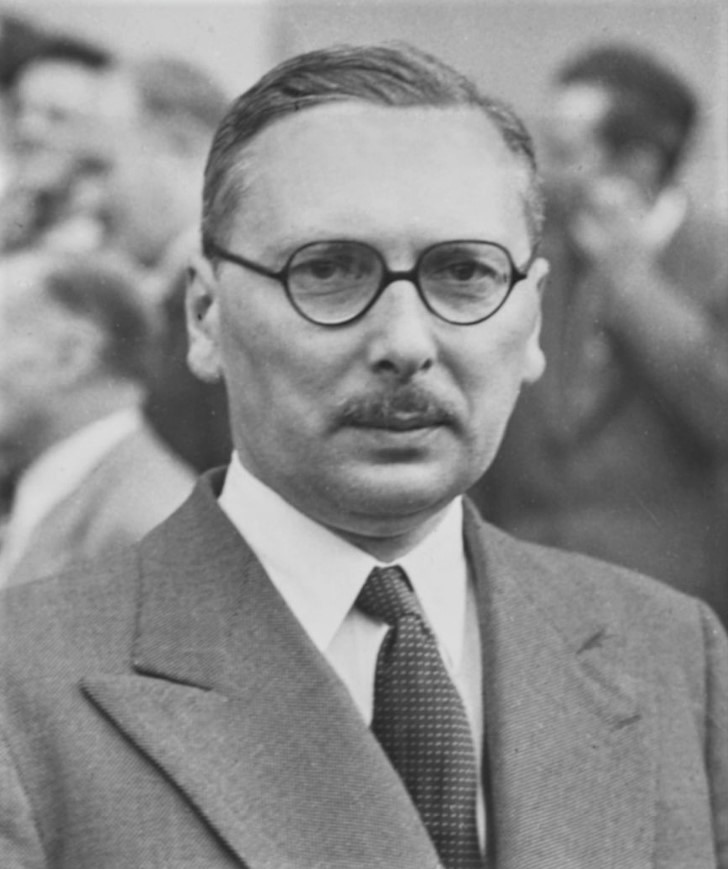
French Prime Minister René Pleven (1951)

The Treaty of Dunkirk was in essence succeeded in March 1948 by Article 4 of the Treaty of Brussels, to which the Benelux countries were also party, established in September the same year the Western Union (WU), also referred to as the Brussels Treaty Organisation (BTO), with an allied European command structure under British Field Marshal Montgomery. West Germany had been occupied by Allied forces and lacked its own means of defense. The military arm of the WU was referred to as the Western Union Defence Organisation (WUDO). The overall command structure was patterned after the wartime Supreme Headquarters Allied Expeditionary Force (SHAEF), which included a joint planning staff. WUDO could also be compared with the defence organisation in the United Kingdom.

When the division of Europe into two opposing camps became considered unavoidable, the threat of the USSR became much more important than the threat of German rearmament. Western Europe, therefore, sought a new mutual defence pact involving the United States, a powerful military force for such an alliance. The United States, concerned with containing the influence of the USSR, was responsive. Secret meetings began by the end of March 1949 between American, Canadian and British officials to initiate the negotiations that led to the signing of the North Atlantic Treaty on 4 April 1949 in Washington, DC. The need to back up the commitments of the North Atlantic Treaty with appropriate political and military structures led to the creation of the North Atlantic Treaty Organisation (NATO). In December 1950, with the appointment of General Eisenhower as the first Supreme Allied Commander Europe (SACEUR), the members of the Treaty of Brussels decided to transfer the headquarters, personnel, and plans of the Western Union Defence Organisation (WUDO) to NATO. NATO's Supreme Headquarters Allied Powers Europe (SHAPE) took over responsibility for the defence of Western Europe, while the physical headquarters in Fontainebleau were transformed into NATO's Headquarters, Allied Forces Central Europe (AFCENT). The establishment of NATO and the International Authority for the Ruhr, along with the signing of a succession of treaties establishing Organisation for European Economic Cooperation (April 1948), the Council of Europe (May 1949) and the European Coal and Steel Community (April 1951), left the Western Union and its founding Treaty of Brussels devoid of much of their prominence.

In the 1950s, both as a lesson from two World Wars, where national armies have caused mass destruction in Europe, and as a result of the escalation of the Cold War due to the Korean War, together with an acute fear of a further expansion of the Soviet sphere of influence into Western Europe, the British prime minister Winston Churchill, among others, called in August 1950 for a common European army with West German participation:

We should make a gesture of practical and constructive guidance by declaring ourselves in favour of the immediate creation of a European Army under a unified command, and in which we should all bear a worthy and honourable part.

— Winston Churchill, Address to the Council of Europe, 1950

The Parliamentary Assembly of the Council of Europe subsequently endorsed the creation of such a European army in a resolution on August 11, 1950 at the request of the United Kingdom:

The Assembly, in order to express its devotion to the maintenance of peace and its resolve to sustain the action of the Security Council of the United Nations in defence of peaceful peoples against aggression, calls for the immediate creation of a unified European Army subject to proper European democratic control and acting in full co-operation with the United States and Canada.

— Resolution of the Parliamentary Assembly of the Council of Europe, 1950

In October 1950, French Prime Minister René Pleven substantiated the idea by outlining the creation of a common army of the "inner six" countries of European integration (Belgium, France, Italy, Luxembourg, the Netherlands, and West Germany) under a European defense minister and ministry. This scheme that was similar in nature to the ECSC but concerned defence should strengthen defence against the Soviet threat without directly rearming Germany, as the Americans had called for. In November 1950, the Bundestag approved the German contribution to the "Pleven Plan".

This European Defense Community (EDC) would have consisted of a pan-European military divided into national components, with a common budget, common institutions, common arms and centralised procurement. At the time, this was favoured over admitting Germany to NATO. The General Treaty (German: Deutschlandvertrag) of 1952 formally named the EDC as a prerequisite of the end of Allied occupation of Germany. In May 1952, the EDC Treaty was finally signed by all participating foreign ministers. As a long-term vision, it even envisioned the merging of Europe into a political union (the so-called European Political Community). The EDC founding treaty did not enter into force, however, as it failed to obtain approval for ratification on 30 August 1954 in the French National Assembly where Gaullists feared for national sovereignty and Communists opposed a European military consolidation that could rival the Soviet Union.

== 1954–1970: A dormant WEU is established ==
The failure to establish the EDC resulted in the 1954 amendment of the Treaty of Brussels at the London and Paris Conferences, which in replacement of EDC established the political Western European Union (WEU) out of the Western Union. While the WEU was not as broad or powerful as the previously proposed EDC, it was nevertheless sufficient for the Deutschlandvertrag to come into force and therefore to end the occupation of West Germany, give it full sovereignty and admit it as an ally in the Cold War, both in the WEU and NATO. Italy was also admitted in these organisations. From this point defence aims had shifted to the Soviet Union.

On a sidenote, had the 1955 referendum on the Saar statute, held in the Saar Protectorate, not failed, territory would have become an independent polity under the auspices of a European Commissioner, to be appointed by the Council of Ministers of the Western European Union, while remaining in the economic union with France. Its rejection by voters was taken as an indication that they would rather reunite with West Germany. On 27 October 1956, France and West Germany concluded the Saar Treaty establishing that Saarland should be allowed to join West Germany as provided by article 23 of its constitution (Grundgesetz), so Saarland became a state of Germany with effect from 1 January 1957.

On 1 January 1960, in accordance with a decision taken on 21 October the previous year by the Council of Western European Union and with Resolution(59)23 adopted on 16 November 1959 by the Committee of Ministers of the Council of Europe, the WEU activities in social and cultural areas (Social Committee, Public Health Committee, Joint Committee on the Rehabilitation and Resettlement of the Disabled and Cultural Committee) were transferred to the Council of Europe, which was already running programmes in these fields. The European Universities Committee (see CM(60)4; C(59)127 and CM(59)130) was transferred to the Council of Europe separately from the rest of WEU cultural activities.

== 1970–1984: Initial co-ordination of EC foreign policy ==
In the wake of the EDC's failure, Charles de Gaulle proposed the Fouchet Plan in 1961, which would have created a more intergovernmentally oriented "Union of European Peoples", with a common defence policy. The Fouchet Plan was met with scepticism among the other member states of the European Communities, and never implemented.

In 1970 the European Political Cooperation (EPC) was introduced as an initial coordination of foreign policy within the European Communities (EC). The involvement of the United Kingdom guaranteed its Atlanticist nature. Although the EPC was mainly intergovernmental, the European Commission would be able to express its opinion if matters within its competencies were concerned. The EPC was amended and strengthened in the so-called Copenhagen and London reports in 1973 and 1981, respectively, and codified (formalised) in 1986 with the Single European Act.

Although the EPC enhanced the European Communities' role on the international scene during the 1970s, notably in the Middle East conflict and in the creation of the Conference on Security and Co-operation in Europe, it was considered a mixed success.

== 1984–1998: WEU revived, EU established ==
From the late 1970s onwards, efforts were made to add a security dimension to the EC's EPC. Opposition to these efforts from Denmark, Greece and Ireland led the remaining EC countries – all WEU members – to reactivate the WEU by means of the 1984 Rome Declaration. Following the European Communities' 1986 Single European Act, which codified the EPC in EU law contained little of substance on EC defence integration, the WEU member states adopted the Platform on European Security Interests, which emphasised the need for intra-European defence integration and strengthening of NATO's European pillar.

We recall our commitment to build a European union in accordance with the Single European Act, which we all signed as members of the [European Communities]. We are convinced that the construction of an integrated Europe will remain incomplete as long as it does not include security and defence.

— Platform on European Security Interests, Western European Union (The Hague, 27 October 1987)

In 1992, the WEU adopted the Petersberg Declaration, defining the so-called Petersberg tasks designed to cope with the possible destabilising of Eastern Europe. The WEU itself had no standing army but depended on cooperation between its members. Its tasks ranged from the most modest to the most robust, and included Humanitarian, rescue and peacekeeping tasks as well as tasks for combat forces in crisis management, including peacemaking.

Upon the entry into force of the Maastricht Treaty in 1993, the European Union was established, consisting of three pillars, of which the first was the European Communities, one was the Common Foreign and Security Policy (CFSP) – a replacement of the European Communities' EPC – and the last was the Justice and Home Affairs (JHA). The CFSP pillar became a natural basis for a further deepening of EU defence policy cooperation.

At the 1996 NATO ministerial meeting in Berlin, it was agreed that the WEU would oversee the creation of a European Security and Defence Identity (ESDI) within NATO structures. The ESDI was intended as a European 'pillar' within NATO, partly to allow European countries to act militarily where NATO wished not to, and partly to alleviate the United States' financial burden of maintaining military bases in Europe, which it had done since the Cold War. The Berlin agreement allowed European countries (through the WEU) to use NATO assets if it so wished.

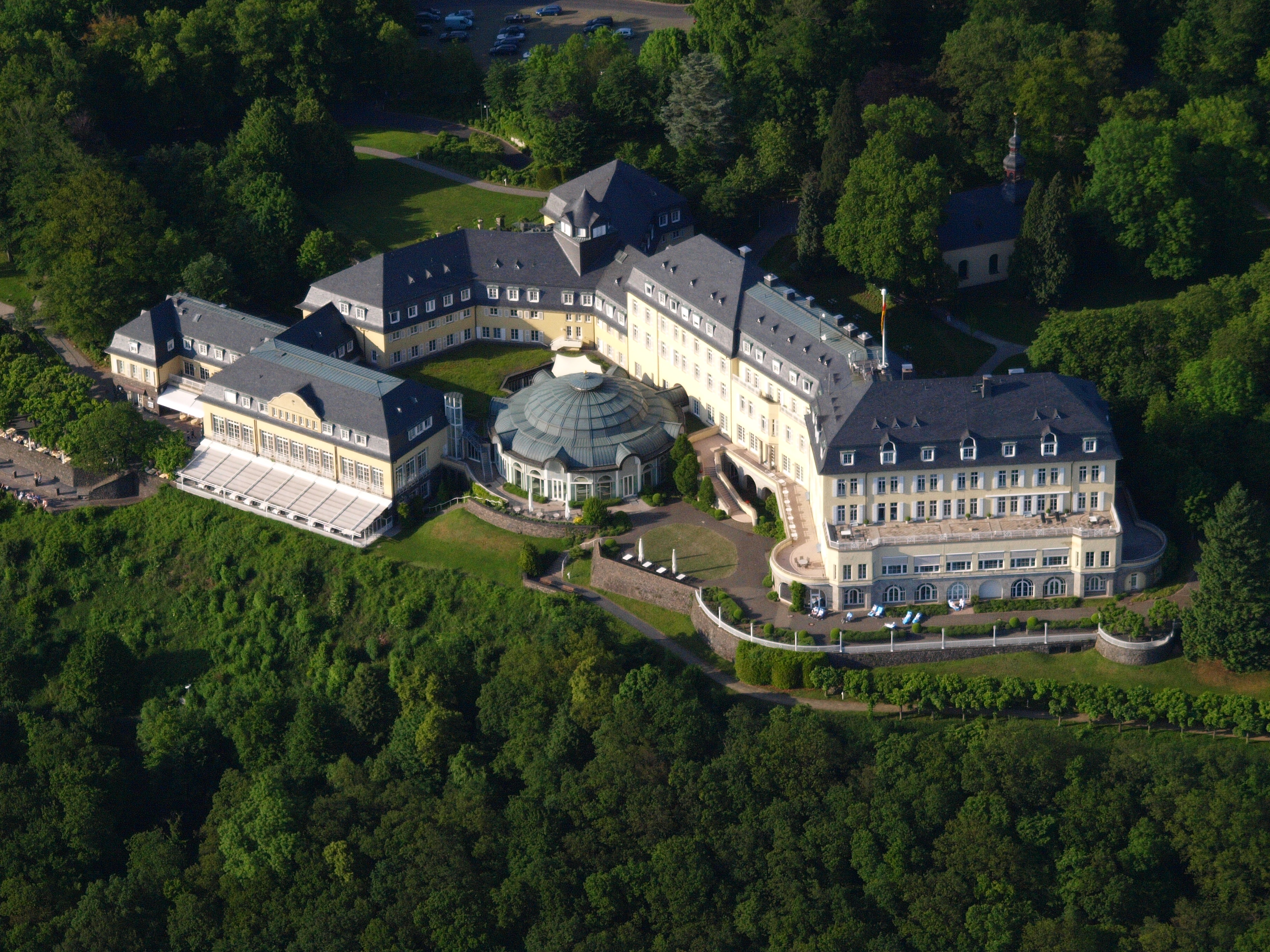
Hotel Petersberg, where the Petersberg tasks were defined in 1992.

Flag of the Western European Union (1993–1995)

Flag of the Western European Union (1995–2011)

Emblem of the Western European Armaments Group (1992–2005)

== 1998–2009: EU takes over WEU tasks, gains autonomous structures ==
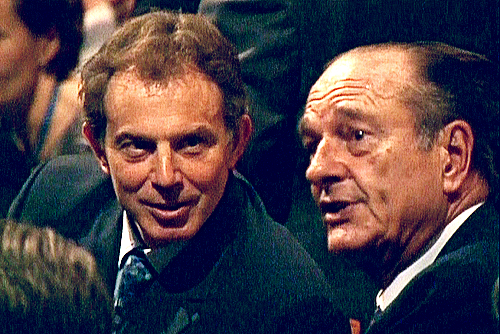
British Prime Minister Blair and French President Chirac, who signed the 1998 St. Malo declaration, which paved the way for an autonomous EU defence arm

On 4 December 1998 the United Kingdom, which had traditionally opposed the introduction of European autonomous defence capacities, signed the Saint-Malo declaration together with France.

[...] the Union must have the capacity for autonomous action, backed up by credible military forces, the means to decide to use them, and a readiness to do so, in order to respond to international crises.

— Saint-Malo declaration, 4 December 1998

This marked a turning point as the declaration endorsed the creation of a European security and defense policy, including a European military force capable of autonomous action. The declaration was a response to the Kosovo War in the late 1990s, in which the EU was perceived to have failed to intervene to stop the conflict.

Following the establishment of the ESDI and the St. Malo declaration, US Secretary of State Madeleine Albright were among others who voiced concern that an independent European security pillar could undermine NATO, as she put forth the three famous D's:

Our [...] task is working together to develop [the ESDI] within [NATO], which the United States has strongly endorsed. We enthusiastically support any such measures that enhance European capabilities. The United States welcomes a more capable European partner, with modern, flexible military forces capable of putting out fires in Europe's own back yard and working with us through [NATO] to defend our common interests. The key to a successful initiative is to focus on practical military capabilities. Any initiative must avoid preempting [NATO] decision-making by de-linking ESDI from NATO, avoid duplicating existing efforts, and avoid discriminating against non-EU members. [...]

— US Secretary of State Albright, North Atlantic Council (8 December 1998)

As a direct consequence of the Saint-Malo summit, the EU formulated a "Headline Goal" in Helsinki in 1999, setting 2003 as a target date for the creation of a European force of up to 60,000 troops, and establishing a catalogue of forces, the 'Helsinki Force Catalogue', to be able to carry out the so-called "Petersberg Tasks".

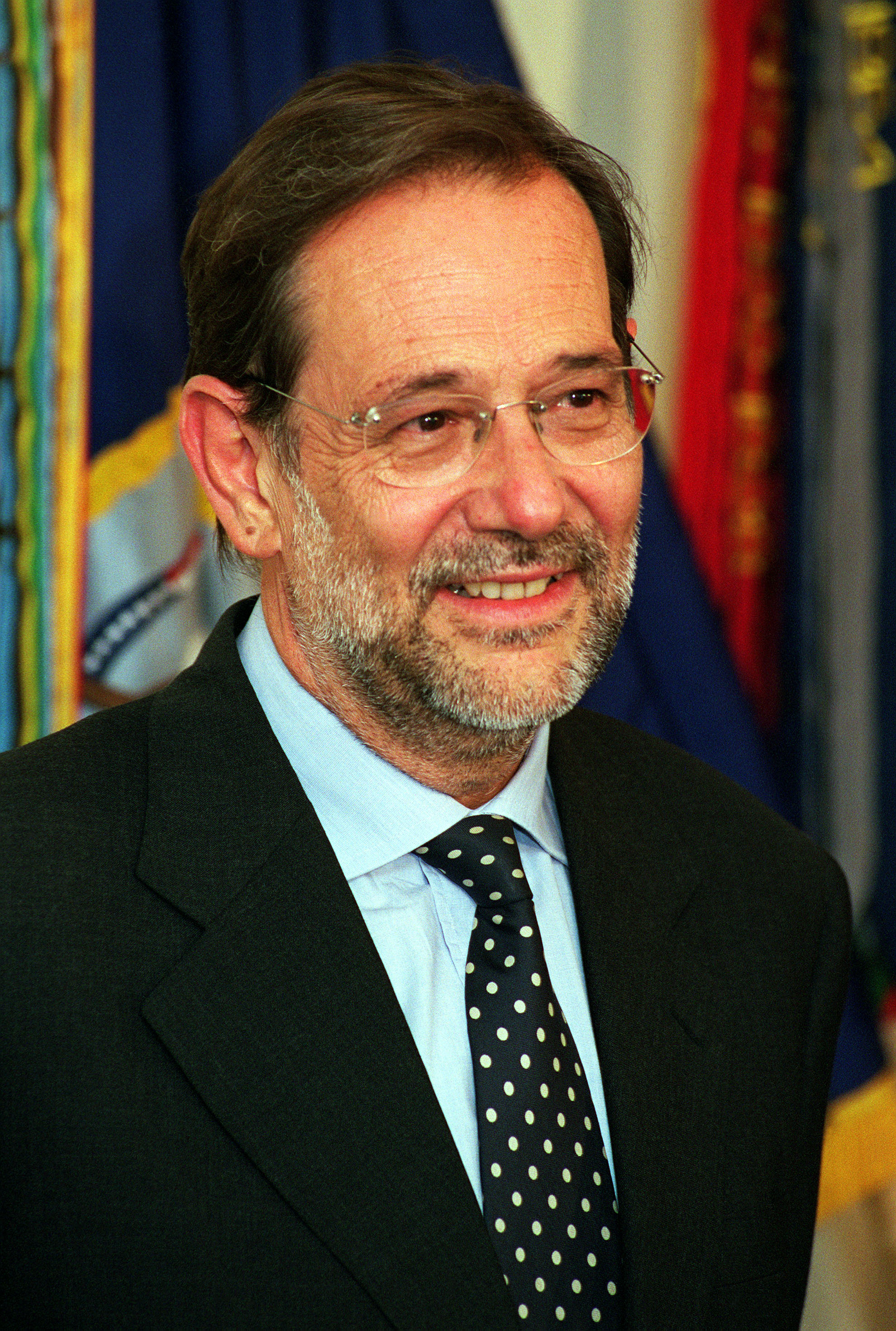
Javier Solana, who served as High Representative between 1999 and 2009

The Treaty of Amsterdam, which entered into force in 1999, transferred the WEU's Petersberg tasks to the EU, and stated that the EU's European Security and Defence Policy (ESDP), replacing the WEU's ESDI, would be 'progressively framed' on the basis of these tasks.

In June 1999, the Cologne European Council decided to incorporate the role of the WEU within the EU, effectively abandoning the WEU. The Cologne Council also appointed Javier Solana as the High Representative for Common Foreign and Security Policy to help progress both the CFSP and the ESDP.

In 2000 and 2001 a number of ESDP bodies were established within the EU Council, including the Political and Security Committee (PSC), the Military Committee (EUMC) and the Military Staff (EUMS).

In 2002 the European Union Satellite Centre superseded the Western European Union Satellite Centre, and the 1996 Berlin agreement was amended with the so-called Berlin Plus agreement, which allowed the EU to also draw on some of NATO's assets in its own peacekeeping operations, subject to a "right of first refusal" in that NATO must first decline to intervene in a given crisis. Additionally, an agreement was signed on information sharing between the EU and NATO, and EU liaison cells were added at NATO's Supreme Headquarters Allied Powers Europe (SHAPE) and Joint Force Command (JFC) in Naples.

In 2003 the Treaty of Nice entered into force, providing the ESDP's legal foundation in terms of competences, organisation, structures and assets. The same year the ESDP became operational through its first missions and operations, and the EU adopted its European Security Strategy, outlining common threats and objectives. The European security strategy was for the first time drawn up in 2003 under the authority of the EU's High Representative for the Common Foreign and Security Policy, Javier Solana, and adopted by the Brussels European Council of 12 and 13 December 2003. With the emergence of the ESDP, it was the first time that Europe had formulated a joint security strategy. It could be considered a counterpart to the National Security Strategy of the United States.

It became clear that the objectives of the outlined in the Helsinki Headline Goal were not achievable quickly. In May 2004, EU defence ministers approved "Headline Goal 2010", extending the timelines for the EU's projects. However, it became clear that the objectives cannot be achieved by this date too. French Foreign Minister Alain Juppé expressed his desperation: "The common security and defense policy of Europe? It is dead."

In 2004 the European Defence Agency (EDA) was established to facilitate defence integration.

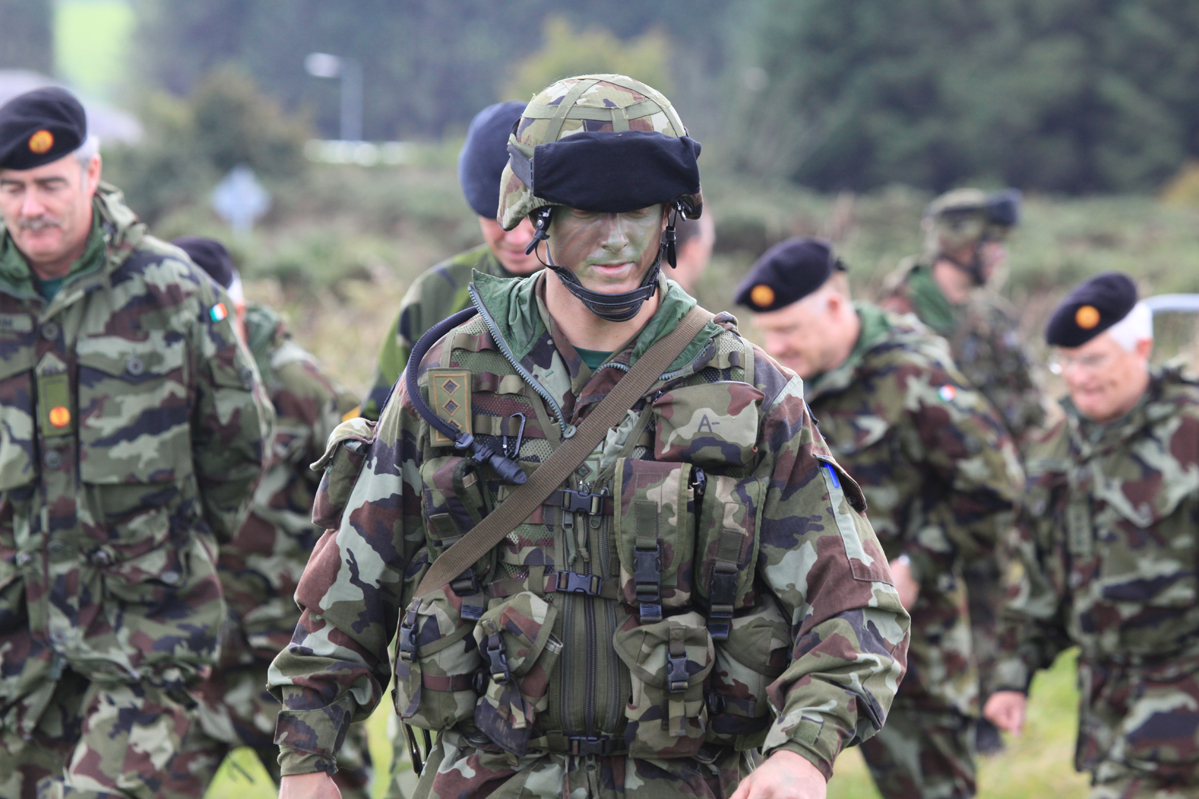
Irish Army personnel from the EU's Nordic Battle Group at an exercise in 2010: No battle group has as of yet been deployed

The Helsinki Headline Goal Catalogue is a listing of rapid reaction forces composed of 60,000 troops managed by the European Union, but under control of the countries who deliver troops for it. In 2005 the EU Battlegroups (BG) initiative was operational as a result of the Helsinki Headline Goal process. Each battlegroup were to quickly be able to deploy about 1,500 personnel.

Since the inception of the EU's European Security and Defence Policy (ESDP) in 1999 (renamed the Common Security and Defence Policy, CSDP, in 2009), missions had only ad hoc operational headquarters (OHQs.) The United Kingdom, in particular, had blocked moves towards establishing a permanent EU OHQ that could duplicate or undermine the North Atlantic Treaty Organization's (NATO) Allied Command Operations (ACO) – and its SHAPE headquarters in Mons, Belgium.

As of 2017, CSDP missions had the following ad hoc OHQ options, from which the Council would choose:

- OHQs offered by member states, e.g. Northwood Headquarters as made available by the United Kingdom
- Allied Command Operations (ACO) of the North Atlantic Treaty Organisation (NATO), based on the Berlin Plus agreement
- European Union Operations Centre (EU OPCEN), a limited ad hoc headquarters outside the EEAS

== 2009–2015: Deeper cooperation enabled, WEU dissolved ==
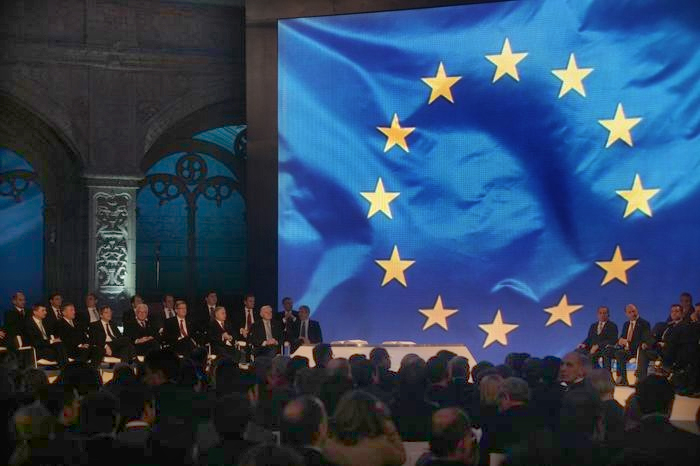
Signing of the Treaty of Lisbon (2007)

Upon the entry into force of the Treaty of Lisbon in 2009 the ESDP was renamed the Common Security and Defence Policy (CSDP), a mutual defence clause was introduced among member states and a subset of willing member states fulfilling 'higher criteria' were allowed to pursue Permanent Structured Cooperation (PESCO). The post of High Representative of the Union for Foreign Affairs and Security Policy also superseded the two previous posts of High Representative for the Common Foreign and Security Policy and European Commissioner for External Relations. The treaty also led to the dissolution of the Western European Union in 2011 as, with the solidarity clause (deemed to supersede the WEU's military mutual defence clause) and the expansion of the CSDP, the WEU became redundant.

Comparison of mutual defence clauses:

Article 42.7 of the consolidated version of the Treaty on European Union:

"If a Member State is the victim of armed aggression on its territory, the other Member States shall have towards it an obligation of aid and assistance by all the means in their power, in accordance with Article 51 of the United Nations Charter. This shall not prejudice the specific character of the security and defence policy of certain Member States. [...]"

Article V of the Modified Treaty of Brussels:

"If any of the High Contracting Parties should be the object of an armed attack in Europe, the other High Contracting Parties will, in accordance with the provisions of Article 51 of the Charter of the United Nations, afford the Party so attacked all the military and other aid and assistance in their power."

Article 5 of the North Atlantic Treaty:

"The Parties agree that an armed attack against one or more of them [on their territory] shall be considered an attack against them all and consequently they agree that, if such an armed attack occurs, each of them, in exercise of the right of individual or collective self-defence recognised by Article 51 of the Charter of the United Nations, will assist the Party or Parties so attacked by taking forthwith, individually and in concert with the other Parties, such action as it deems necessary, including the use of armed force, to restore and maintain the security of the North Atlantic area. [...]"

== Since 2015: New political impetus, structural integration ==
The mutual defence clause, Article 42.7, was invoked for the first time in November 2015 following the terrorist attacks in Paris, which were described by French President François Hollande as an attack against Europe as a whole.

In 2016 HR/VP Federica Mogherini drew up a new security strategy, the European Union Global Strategy, which along with the Russian annexation of Crimea, the scheduled British withdrawal from the EU and the election of Donald Trump as US President have given the CSDP a new impetus.

This has given rise to a number of initiatives:

- Permanent Structured Cooperation (PESCO; 2017–)
- Coordinated Annual Review on Defence (CARD; 2019-)
- European Defence Fund (EDF; 2017)
- Military Planning and Conduct Capability (MPCC; 2017)
- Directorate-General for Defence Industry and Space (2019-)

The MPCC is a part of the External Action Service's Military Staff (EUMS) that constitutes the EU's first permanent operational headquarters. The Director General of the EUMS also serves as Director of the MPCC – exercising command and control over the operations within the MPCC's remit.

In wake of the Russian invasion of Ukraine in February 2022, the EU gave €500M in arms and aid from its European Peace Facility to the Ukrainian armed forces. This was the first time the EU financed the purchase and delivery of military equipment to a country under attack. On 1 June 2022, Denmark held a referendum on the lifting of the country's defense opt-out on EU security policies, that would enable Denmark to participate in the Common Security and Defense Policy. The referendum was passed with a majority of almost a 67% of voters in favour. In October 2022, the EU launched a military assistance mission in support of Ukraine, which entails training Ukrainian forces on EU soil.

== Timeline ==
Abbreviations:

BG: battle group
CARD: Coordinated Annual Review on Defence
CFE: Treaty on Conventional Armed Forces in Europe
CFSP: Common Foreign and Security Policy
CoE: Council of Europe
CSDP: Common Security and Defence Policy
EATC: European Air Transport Command
EBCG: European Border and Coast Guard
EC: European Communities (i.e. EEC, ECSC and EURATOM)
EDF: European Defence Fund
EEC: European Economic Community
ECSC: European Coal and Steel Community
EDA: European Defence Agency
EDC: European Defence Community
EEAS: European External Action Service
EEC: European Economic Community
EI2: European Intervention Initiative
EPC: European Political Cooperation
ERP: European Recovery Program (Marshall Plan)
ESDI: European Security and Defence Identity
EUMS: European Union Military Staff
EUROCORPS: European Corps
EUROFOR: European Rapid Operational Force
EUROGENDFOR: European Gendarmerie Force
EUROMARFOR: European Maritime Force
ESDP: European Security and Defence Policy
EU: European Union
EURATOM: European Atomic Energy Community
HHG: Helsinki Headline Goal
HR-CFSP: High Representative for Common Foreign and Security Policy
HR/VP: High Representative of the Union for Foreign Affairs and Security Policy
ISS: Institute for Security Studies
MC: Military Committee
MPCC: Military Planning and Conduct Capability
NATO: North Atlantic Treaty Organisation
OCCAR: Organisation for Joint Armament Cooperation
PESCO: Permanent Structured Cooperation
SatCen: Satellite Centre
UK: United Kingdom
WEAG: Western European Armaments Group
WEAO: Western European Armaments Organization
WEU: Western European Union
WU: Western Union

== See also ==
- List of military and civilian missions of the European Union
- History of the Common Foreign and Security Policy
- History of the European Union
- Military history of Europe
- History of the North Atlantic Treaty Organization

Major CSDP offices:

- List of High Representatives
- List of Chairmen of the European Union Military Committee
- List of Directors General of the European Union Military Staff

History of military precursors of the European Union:

- History of the Western European Union
- History of the Western Union

Other:

- Scandinavian defence union (proposed in the post-war period)
