= European Union Military Committee =

EU body composed of member states' Chiefs of Defence

- Coat of arms
- Active: December 2000–present
- Allegiance: European Union
- Location: Brussels, Belgium
- Website: europa.eu

Commanders
- High Repr.: Kaja Kallas
- Chairman: General Seán Clancy
- Deputy Chair: Lieutenant General Enrico Barduani

Insignia
- Flag

- Chairman's arms

The Military Committee of the European Union (EUMC) is the body of the European Union's (EU) Common Security and Defence Policy that is composed of member states' Chiefs of Defence (CHOD). These national CHODs are regularly represented in the EUMC in Brussels by their permanent Military Representatives (MilRep), who often are two- or three-star flag officers.

The EUMC is under the authority of the EU's High Representative (HR) and the Political and Security Committee (PSC).

== History ==
The EUMC was established in December 2000 by the European Council of Nice. It is one of several defence and security-related bodies established as a result of the Helsinki Headline Goal, which was decided in December 1999.

== Function ==
The EUMC gives military advice to the EU's High Representative (HR) and Political and Security Committee (PSC). The EUMC also oversees the European Union Military Staff (EUMS).

The relationship between the High Representative, the Military Staff and Military Committee as of November 2017: Colour key:
High Representative (a Vice-President of the Commission)
Military Committee (EUMC; a Council body)
Military Staff (EUMS; a Directorate-General of the External Action Service)

High Representative
Chairman EUMC
Working Group
Working Group/Headline Goal Task Force	Director General EUMS/ Director MPCC
Legal advisor	Deputy Director General	Horizontal Coordination
Assistant Chief of Staff for Synchronisation	EU cell at SHAPE	EU Liaison at the UN in NY	Assistant Chief of Staff for External Relations	NATO Permanent Liaison Team
Concepts & Capabilities; Directorate	Intelligence; Directorate	Operations; Directorate	Logistics; Directorate	Communications & Information Systems; Directorate	Military Planning and Conduct Capability (MPCC) Chief of Staff Working Group Current Operations

=== Role in command and control of missions ===
The EU command and control (C2) structure is directed by political bodies composed of member states' representatives, and generally requires unanimous decisions. As of April 2019:

Liaison: Advice and recommendations Support and monitoring Preparatory work

Political strategic level:^{[5]}
ISS	EUCO Pres. (EUCO)	Chain of command
Coordination/support
SatCen	CIVCOM	HR/VP (FAC)
INTCEN	HR/VP (PMG)	HR/VP (PSC)^{[6]}	CEUMC (EUMC)
CMPD	DGEUMS^{[3]} (EUMS)
Military/civilian strategic level:
Dir MPCC^{[3]} (MPCC)	JSCC	Civ OpCdr CPCC^{[1]}
Operational level:
MFCdr^{[4]} (MFHQ)	HoM^{[1]}
Tactical level:
CC^{[2]}Air; CC^{[2]} Land; CC^{[2]} Mar; Other CCs^{[2]} European Armed Forces

^{1} In the event of a CSDP Civilian Mission also being in the field, the relations with the Civilian Planning and Conduct Capability (CPCC) and its Civilian Operation Commander (Civ OpCdr), as well as the subordinate Head of Mission (HoM), are coordinated as shown.

^{2} Other Component Commanders (CCs) and service branches which may be established.

^{3} The MPCC is part of the EUMS and Dir MPCC is double-hatted as DGEUMS. Unless the MPCC is used as Operation Headquarters (OHQ), either a national OHQ offered by member states or the NATO Command Structure (NCS) would serve this purpose. In the latter instance, Deputy Supreme Allied Commander Europe (DSACEUR), rather than Dir MPCC, would serve as Operation Commander (OpCdr).

^{4} Unless the MPCC is used as Operation Headquarters (OHQ), the MFCdr would be known as a Force Commander (FCdr), and direct a Force Headquarters (FHQ) rather than a MFHQ. Whereas the MFHQ would act both on the operational and tactical level, the FHQ would act purely on the operational level.

^{5} The political strategic level is not part of the C2 structure per se, but represents the political bodies, with associated support facilities, that determine the missions' general direction. The Council determines the role of the High Representative (HR/VP), who serves as Vice-President of the European Commission, attends European Council meetings, chairs the Foreign Affairs Council (FAC) and may chair the Political and Security Committee (PSC) in times of crisis. The HR/VP proposes and implements CSDP decisions.

^{6} Same composition as Committee of Permanent Representatives (COREPER) II, which also prepares for the CSDP-related work of the FAC.

== Current EU Chiefs of Defence ==
Country	CHOD	Military Branch	Took Office
Austria	Major General Rudolf Striedinger; Chief of the General Staff	Land Forces	20 October 2022
Belgium	General Frederik Vansina; Chief of Defence	Air Force	4 July 2025
Bulgaria	Admiral Emil Eftimov; Chief of Defence	Navy	30 March 2020
Croatia	Colonel General Tihomir Kundid; Chief of the General Staff	Army	8 March 2024
Cyprus	Lieutenant General Emmanouel Theodorou; Chief of the National Guard General Staff	Ground Forces	9 October 2025
Czech Republic	Lieutenant General Miroslav Hlavac; Chief of the General Staff	Land Forces	1 July 2026
Denmark	General Michael Hyldgaard; Chief of Defence	Royal Army	1 June 2025
Estonia	Lieutenant General Andrus Merilo; Commander of the Defence Forces	Land Forces	1 July 2024
Finland	General Janne Jaakkola; Chief of Defence	Army	1 April 2024
France	General Fabien Mandon; Chief of the Defence Staff	Air and Space Force	1 September 2025
Germany	General Carsten Breuer; Inspector General of the Bundeswehr	Army	23 March 2023
Greece	General Dimitrios Choupis; Chief of the National Defence General Staff	Army	12 January 2024
Hungary	Colonel General Sándor Zsolt; Chief of the General Staff	Ground Forces	1 June 2026
Ireland	Lieutenant General Rossa Mulcahy; Chief of Staff of the Defence Forces	Army	1 June 2025
Italy	General Luciano Portolano; Chief of the Defence Staff	Army	4 October 2024
Latvia	Major General Kaspars Pudāns; Commander of the Joint Headquarters	National Guard	21 November 2024
Lithuania	General Raimundas Vaikšnoras; Chief of Defence	Land Forces	24 July 2024
Luxembourg	General Steve Thull; Chief of Defence	Army	29 September 2020
Malta	Brigadier Clinton J. O'Neill; Commander of the Armed Forces	Air Wing	28 June 2022
Netherlands	General Onno Eichelsheim; Chief of Defence	Royal Air and Space Force	15 April 2021
Poland	General Wiesław Kukuła; Chief of the General Staff	Territorial Defence Force	10 October 2023
Portugal	General João Cartaxo Alves; Chief of the General Staff	Army	28 February 2026
Romania	General Gheorghiță Vlad; Chief of the General Staff	Land Forces	30 November 2023
Slovakia	General Miroslav Lorinc; Chief of the General Staff	Air Force	7 May 2026
Slovenia	Major General Boštjan Močnik; Chief of the General Staff	Ground Force	15 December 2025
Spain	Admiral General Teodoro Esteban López Calderón; Chief of the Defence Staff	Navy	27 January 2021
Sweden	General Michael Claesson; Chief of Defence	Army	1 October 2024

== Chairman ==
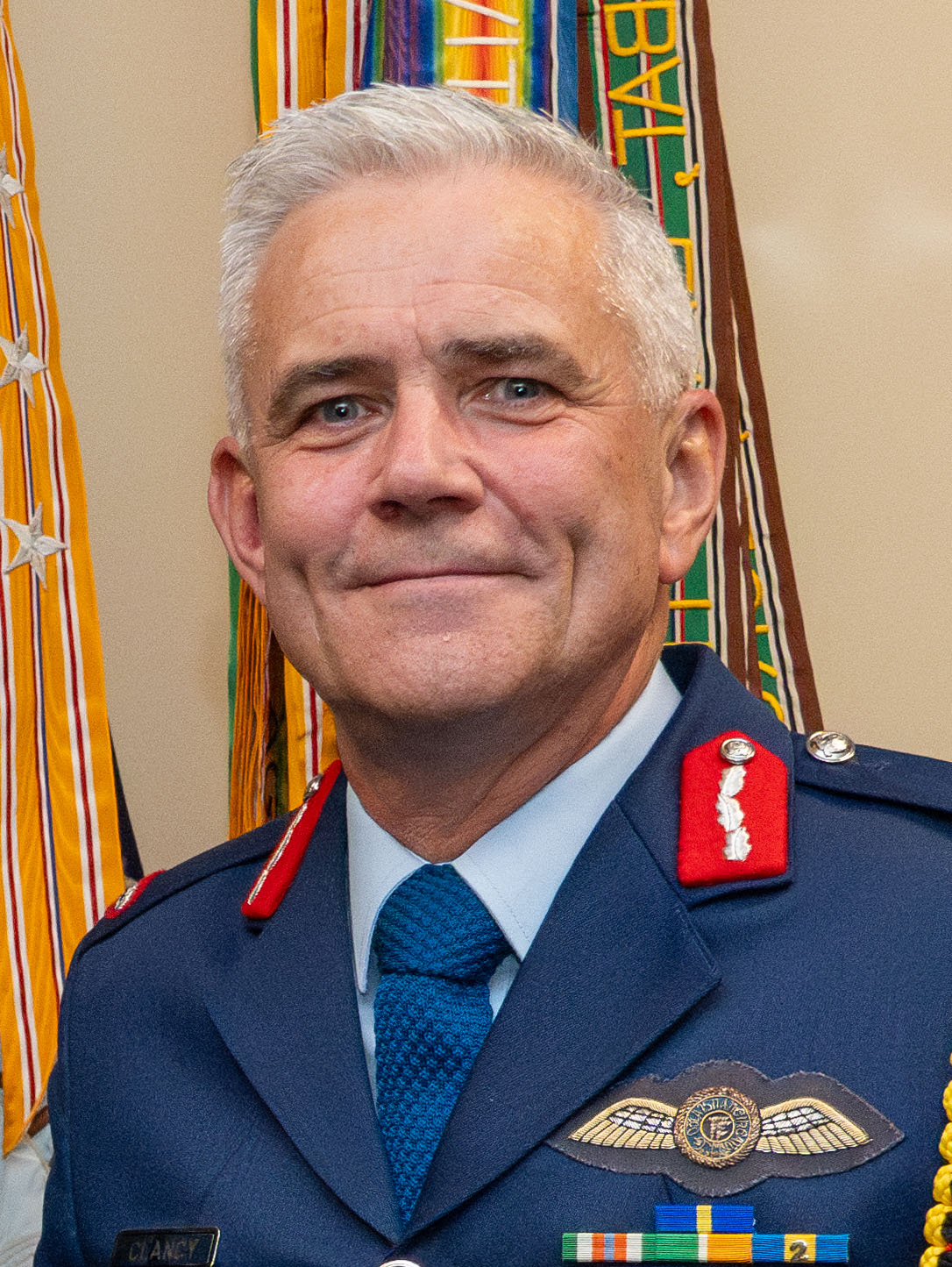
General Seán Clancy has been serving as EUMCC since 1 June 2025.

The EUMC is chaired by a General Officer, Admiral, or Air Officer of four-star level (i.e. NATO OF-9 equivalent), who is selected by the Chiefs of Defence and appointed by the Council of the European Union. For a term of three years the chairman is the spokesperson for the EUMC. He participates in PSC meetings as appropriate, he is the military adviser to the High Representative of the Union for Foreign Affairs and Security Policy (HR) who heads the EEAS European External Action Service, he represents the primary point of contact with the Operation Commanders of the EU's military operations, and he attends Council meetings with defence and security implications.

== See also ==
- Common Security and Defence Policy
- European External Action Service
- Military of the European Union
- Political and Security Committee
- European Union Military Staff
- NATO Military Committee

A similar committee also exists within the North Atlantic Treaty Organisation (NATO). Those countries which are members of both EU and NATO have in most cases chosen to use the same MilRep in both organisations.
