= Euro Force =

Euro Force may refer to:

- Europol, European police intelligence agency
- Military of the European Union
  - European Defence Force
- Euroforce, global multinational professional services company
- Battlefield 2: Euro Force, expansion pack to the video game Battlefield 2
