= Centro de Informações e Segurança Militares =

Portuguese intelligence service

CISMIL Military Security and Informations Center
Agency overview
- Formed: 2010
- Jurisdiction: Government of Portugal
- Minister responsible: Nuno Melo, Minister of National Defence
- Agency executive: Admiral António Manuel Fernandes da Silva Ribeiro, Chief of the General Staff; Commodore Proença Mendes, Chief of the CISMIL
- Parent department: Minister of National Defence
- Parent Agency: Armed Forces General Staff

Centro de Informações e Segurança Militares (Portuguese for "Military Security and Informations Center") or CISMIL is the joint military intelligence service of the Armed Forces of Portugal.

The CISMIL is the body responsible for the production of the intelligence needed for the fulfillment of specific missions of the Portuguese Armed Forces and for ensuring the military security. It is part of the General staff of the Armed Forces (EMGFA) and is headed by a major-general or a rear-admiral.

== Organization ==
In its organization, CISMIL includes:

1. Planning Bureau;
2. Research Coordination and Management Bureau;
3. Production Bureau;
4. Security and Counter-Information Bureau;
5. Defense and Military Attachés Liaison Office;
6. Support Section.

== History ==
CISMIL was created in 2010 in the scope of the reorganization of the General Staff of the Armed Forces of Portugal (EMGFA). It is the successor of several Portuguese joint military intelligence services that existed in the past, namely the EMGFA 2nd Division (1974–75), the SDCI (1975–1976), the DINFO (1977–93) and the DIMIL (1993–97).

The framework law of the Informations System of the Portuguese Republic (SIRP) of 1984, predicted the existence of the SIM (Military Informations Service), that however was never created like that, the role of military intelligence continuing to be performed by the DINFO.

The reorganization of the SIRP, led to the creation of the SIEDM (Military and Defense Strategic Informations Service) in 1997. The new SIEDM assumed the roles previously planned to be divided by the two distinct and never activated agencies, the SIM (military intelligence) and the SIED (foreign strategic intelligence).

In 2007, the new reorganization of the SIRP led again to the separation of the foreign strategic intelligence from the military intelligence. The SIEDM became again the SIED (Defense Strategic Informations Service), with the sole role of foreign intelligence. To fulfill the role of military intelligence, the CISMIL was created in 2010.

It is known that CISMIL operatives were active in support of the Portuguese Forces in Kosovo, Lebanon and Afghanistan.
