= José Nunes da Fonseca =

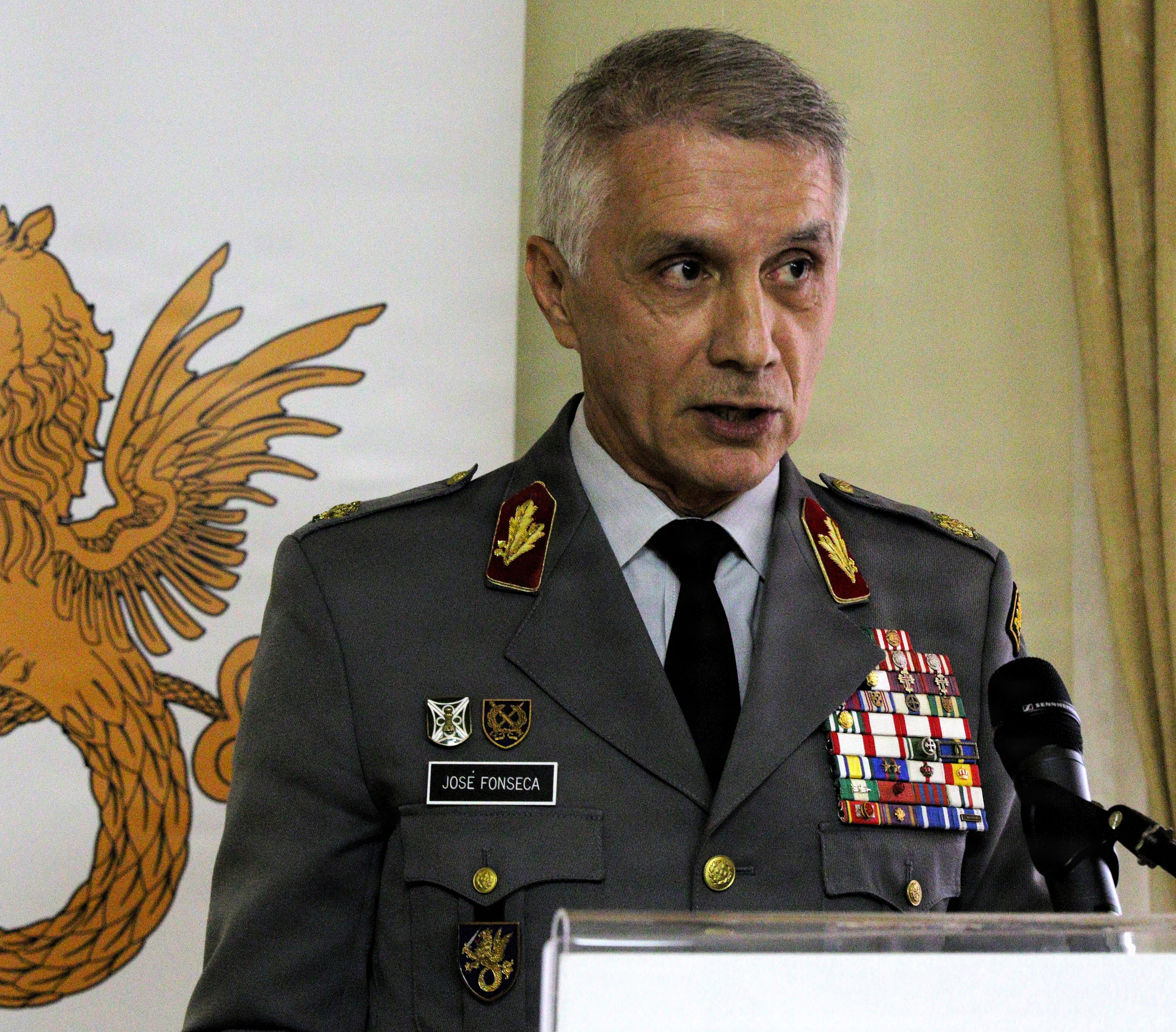
- Fonseca in 2026
- Born: José Nunes da Fonseca; March 19, 1961 (age 65); Mafra, Portugal
- Alma mater: Military Academy (BS, MsME)
- Military career
- Allegiance: Portugal
- Branch: Portuguese Army
- Service years: 1983–2026
- Rank: General
- Commands: Chief of the General Staff; Chief of Staff of the Portuguese Army; Coastal Control Unit, National Republican Guard; Practical School of Engineering; Director of Education and Training, Practical School of Engineering
- Conflicts: Bosnian War (SFOR); Kosovo Force (KFOR)
- Awards: Military Order of Aviz; Military Medal for Distinguished Service; Military Medal of Military Merit; D. Afonso Henriques Medal; Military Medal for Exemplary Conduct; NATO Medal for the former Yugoslavia; NATO Non-Article 5 medal for the Balkans

José Nunes da Fonseca (born 19 March 1961) is a Portuguese general who served as Chief of the General Staff of the Portuguese Armed Forces between March 1, 2023 and March 1, 2026. Fonseca served previously as the Chief of Staff of the Portuguese Army from 1 October 2018 to 1 March 2023, and as commander of the Coastal Control Unit of the National Republican Guard from 2013 to 2017.

== Early life and education ==
Fonseca was born on 1961 at Mafra and later entered the Military Academy in 1979. He eventually entered the military engineering sciences course in the Academy and later graduated as the top student of his class in 1983 and later completed his master's degree in military engineering. Aside from military engineering courses, Fonseca also serves as a member of the Order of Engineers since 1986 and also completed a variety of courses, such as the NBC Defense and Irregular Operations courses, the Routes of Communication Course at the Academia de Ingenieros at Spain in 1991, the General Staff Course and the Joint Staff Internship, the Peace Support Operations Course, the SIACCON Command and Control System Course at Italy in 1997, the Civil Emergency Planning Course and the NATO Senior Officers Policy Course at the NATO School in Oberammergau, Germany in 2012.

== Military Career ==
Fonseca served his junior days at the Practical Engineering School in 1986 to 1987, where he served as a training instructor and deputy company commander. He was later assigned under the 1st Engineering Regiment from 1987 to 1992 and was later designated as a company commander in the Practical Engineering School from 1992 to 1993. From 1994 to 1995, Fonseca later served under the Army General Staff where he served as the Deputy Head of the Logistics Division, and was eventually deployed to Florence, Italy, where he would serve as an officer under the command of the Operations and Logistics Section and later as Head of the Operational Procedures Section of the Operations Division. Fonseca would later be deployed to Bosnia, where he Fonseca would later be assigned at the Cabinet of the Chief of Staff of the Army from 1999 to 2002, where he served as an advisor for both General Affairs and to the Chief of Staff of the Army. Fonseca would later serve as Director of Education and Training and as deputy commander at the Practical Engineering School from 2002 to 2004.

Fonseca would eventually return to the Cabinet of the Chief of the Army General Staff in 2004 to 2005 and once again serves as an advisor to the Chief of Staff of the Army, and would later be named as the commander of the Practical Engineering School from 2005 to 2007. After his stint as commander of the Practical Engineering School, Fonseca would later serve as the Chief of Staff of the General Commander of the Army Logistics from 2007 to 2009. Fonseca would later became the director of the Joint Logistics Support Group of the NATO Rapid Deployable Corps – Spain from 2010 to 2013, and was later deployed to Kosovo as part of the KFOR, where he served as the Commanding General of the Joint Logistics Support Group. Fonseca would later be assigned under the National Republican Guard, where he served as commander of the Coastal Control Unit from January 2013 to 2017, and was later designated as the Inspector from 2017 to 2018, before being named as deputy commander of the National Republican Guard in 2018.

After his stint as the deputy commander of the National Republican Guard, Fonseca would later be named as the Chief of Staff of the Portuguese Army and later assumed the post on 19 October 2018, where he replaced then-General Rovisco Duarte, who was involved in the controversy regarding the Tancos arms theft scandal, a scandal that involved the theft of ammunitions in the Tancos weapons storage depot which consisted of 9 mm caliber cartridges, as well as a variety of grenades and explosive charges. Fonseca's appointment was seen as measure to restore both public trust and stability in the army hierarchy. During his stint as Chief of Staff of the Army, Fonseca initiated modernization and reform initiatives in soldier development by investing in the procurement of modern weapons, optics, camouflages, and additional assets.

On 1 March 2023, Fonseca was appointed as the new Chief of the General Staff and replaced Admiral António da Silva Ribeiro. During his stint as the Chief of the General Staff, Fonseca made efforts to push the armed forces' modernization as a modern, mobile, and networked rapid-deployed force that is equipped against modern threats under the Military Programming Law 2023–2034. The program aims to improve the armed forces' armored assets, artillery units, strike units, air defense systems, command and control systems, protection systems, intelligence and reconnaissance systems, support systems, and additional ammunition, while giving priorities to cyber defense, electronic warfare, defense simulation, unmanned aerial systems, and ground systems integration. Fonseca also made strides in enhancing the armed forces' readiness while enhancing cooperation with NATO allies and other allied countries.

== Awards from Military Service ==
- Grand Cross, Military Order of Aviz
- 5 Silver Grade, Military Medals for Distinguished Service
- 1 Gold Medal for Distinguished Public Security Services
- 1st Class, 2nd Class and 3rd Class, Military Medal of Military Merit
- D. Afonso Henriques Medal
- Gold Grade, Military Medal for Exemplary Conduct
- 5 Commemorative Medals for Special Service Commissions for “Italy 1995-96”, “Italy 1996-99”, “Bosnia 1998-99”, “Kosovo 2011” and “Spain 2010-2013”
- Silver Cross of the Order of Civil Guard Merit (Spain, 2016)
- Marshal Hermes Medal (Brazil, 2004)
- Grand Cross with White Decoration of the Cross of Naval Merit (Spain)
- Officier of the Legion of Honour (France)
- French commemorative medal (Bosnia-Herzegovina, 1998-99)
- Commemorative Cross for the Military Peacekeeping Mission in Kosovo (Italy, 2011)
- Grand Cross of the Order for Merits to Lithuania (Lithuania)
- European Rapid Operational Force(EUROFOR) Medal
- NATO Medal for the former Yugoslavia
- NATO Non-Article 5 medal for the Balkans

== Personal life ==
Fonseca is married and he has two daughters.
