= EUMC =

The abbreviation EUMC can refer to:

- The European Monitoring Centre on Racism and Xenophobia.
- The European Union Military Committee.
