= Chief of defence =

Commissioned officer of armed forces

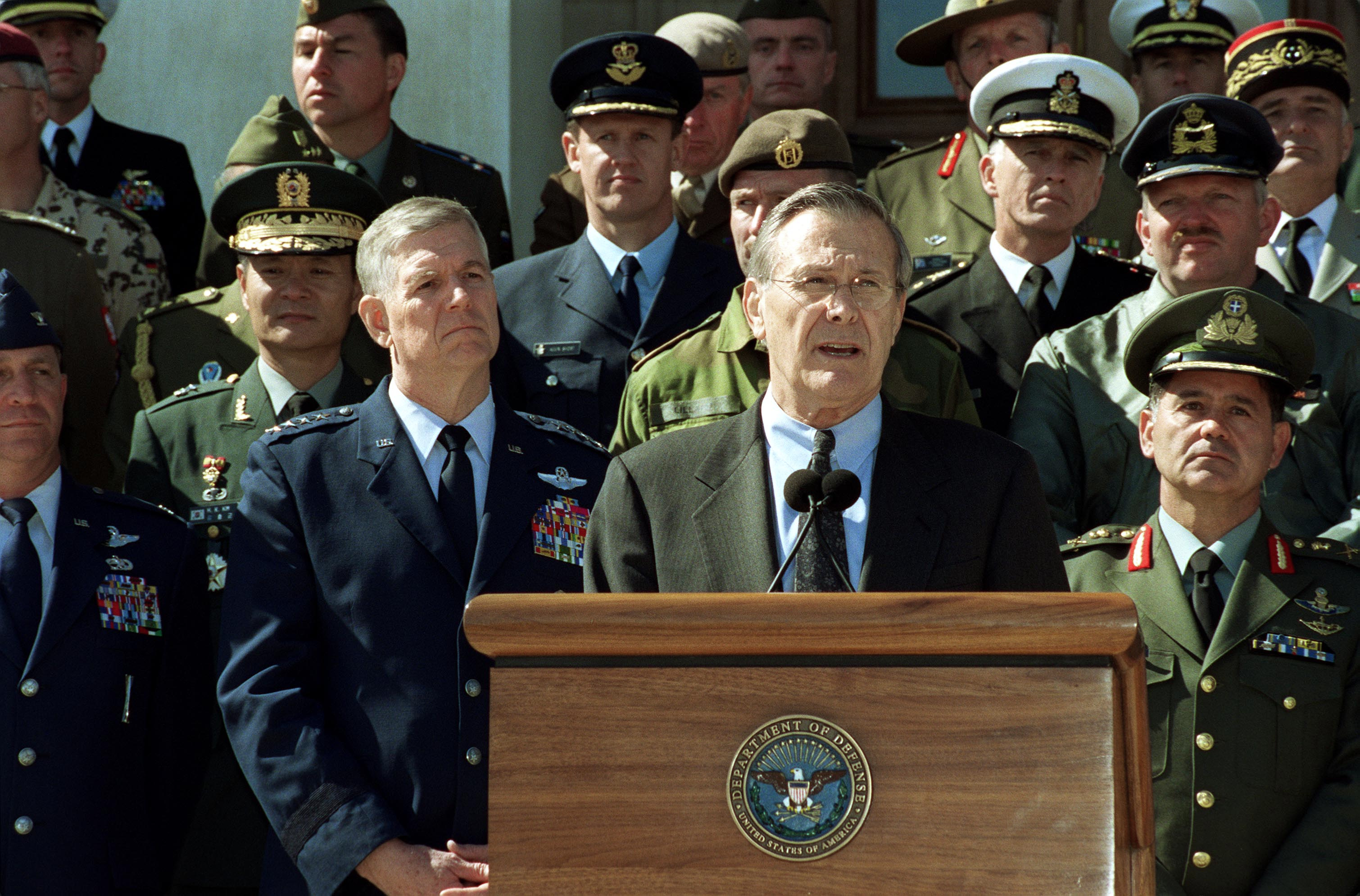
The CHODs from 29 countries gathered at the Pentagon on March 11, 2002. The Chiefs of Defence in the picture include US Air Force gen. Richard B. Myers, Chairman of the Joint Chiefs of Staff; French Army gen. Jean-Pierre Kelche, Chief of the Defence Staff; Dutch Navy adm. Luuk Kroon, Chief of Defence; German Air Force gen. Harald Kujat, Inspector General of the Bundeswehr; British Navy adm. Sir Michael Boyce, Chief of the Defence Staff

A chief of defence (or head of defence) is the highest ranked commissioned officer of a nation's armed forces. The acronym CHOD is in common use within NATO and the European Union (EU) as a generic term for the highest national military position within the NATO and EU member states, rather than the actual term used for individual positions. Thus, irrespective of the formal national designation of that position is some variation on Commander-in-Chief, Chief of Staff, Supreme Commander, or something else, they can all be referred to unambiguously as CHODs in NATO and EU terminology, although other terms are sometimes also seen within NATO. Thus, the chairman of the Joint Chiefs of Staff is the CHOD of the United States, the chief of the defence staff is the CHOD of the United Kingdom, the Inspector General of the Bundeswehr is the CHOD of Germany, and the Chief of Defence (Forsvarssjefen) is the CHOD of Norway.

Both NATO and the EU occasionally hold CHODs meetings of the NATO Military Committee and the European Union Military Committee respectively.

== Chief of defence positions in NATO member countries ==
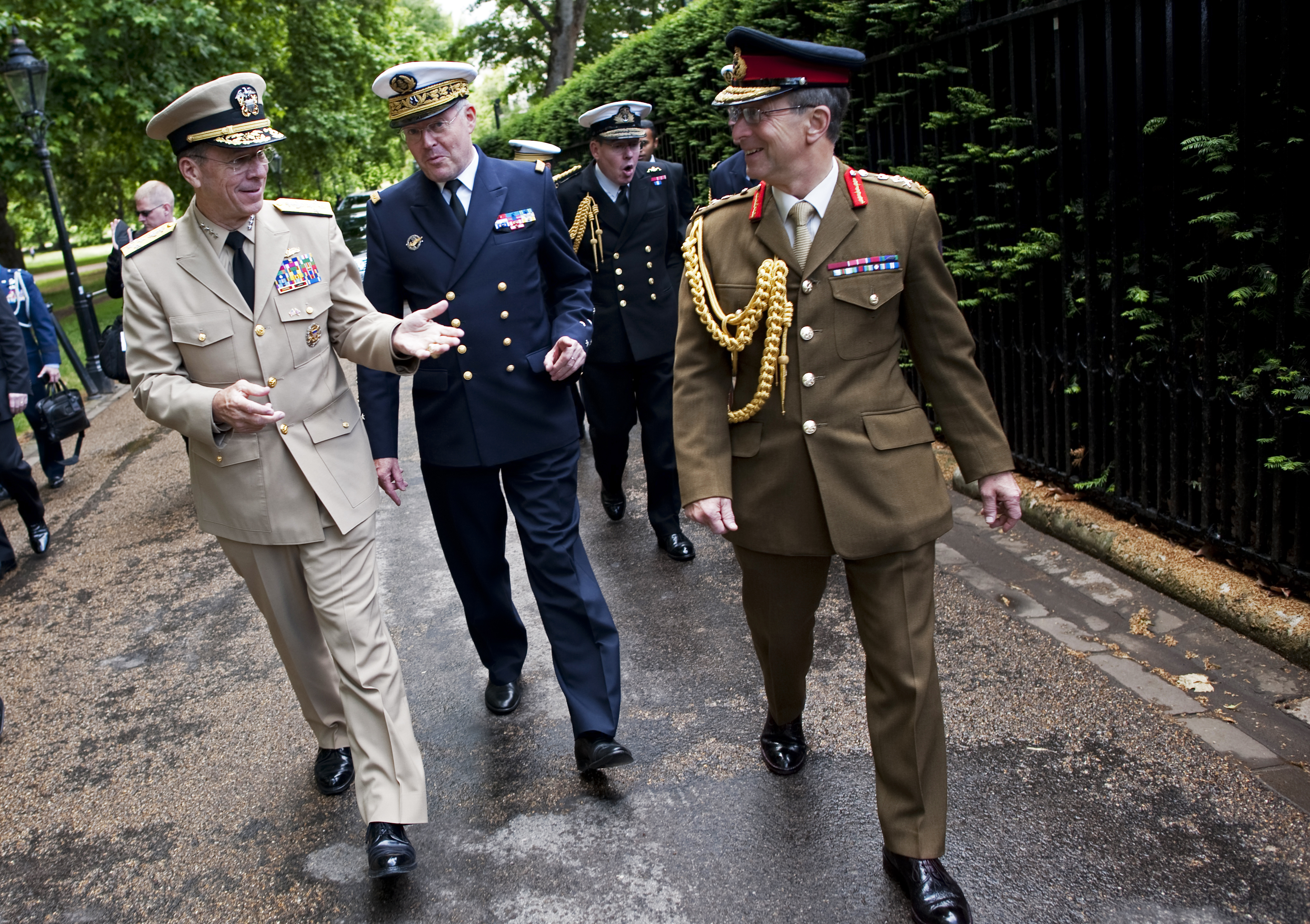
Three CHODs leaving Lancaster House in London, 10 June 2011. L-R: US Navy Adm. Michael Mullen, Chairman of the Joint Chiefs of Staff; French Navy Adm. Édouard Guillaud, Chief of Defence Staff; British Gen. Sir David Richards, Chief of Defence Staff.

Within member states of NATO, the following national positions are the CHOD positions. Sometimes more than one form of translation into English is encountered.

Country	Position	Alternative translations (Note: This is provided when the term given on NATO's homepage is different from the one used in the Wikipedia entry for the position.)	Term in national language
Albania	Chief of the General Staff		Albanian: Shefi i shtabit të përgjithshëm
Belgium	Chief of Defence	Chief of the General Staff	Dutch: Chef Defensie; French: Chef de la Défense
Bulgaria	Chief of the Defence		Bulgarian: Началник на отбраната
Canada	Chief of the Defence Staff		French: Chef d'État-Major de la défense
Croatia	Chief of the General Staff		Croatian: Načelnik Glavnog stožera
Czech Republic	Chief of the General Staff		Czech: Náčelník Generálního štábu
Denmark	Chief of Defence		Danish: Forsvarschefen
Estonia	Commander of the Estonian Defence Forces		Estonian: Kaitseväe juhataja
Finland	Chief of Defence		Finnish: Puolustusvoimain komentaja Swedish: Kommendören för Försvarsmakten
France	Chief of the Defence Staff		French: Chef d'État-Major des armées
Germany	Inspector General of the Bundeswehr	Chief of Defence	German: Generalinspekteur der Bundeswehr
Greece	Chief of the National Defence General Staff		Greek: Αρχηγός του Γενικού Επιτελείου Εθνικής Άμυνας
Hungary	Chief of the General Staff		Hungarian: Vezérkari főnök
Iceland	Director General of the Directorate for Defence		Icelandic: Skrifstofustjóri varnarmálaskrifstofu
Italy	Chief of the Defence Staff		Italian: Capo di Stato Maggiore della Difesa
Latvia	Commander of the National Armed Forces		Latvian: Bruņoto spēku komandieris
Lithuania	Chief of Defence		Lithuanian: Kariuomenės vadas
Luxembourg	Chief of Staff	Chief of Defence	French: Chef d'état-major German: Chef des Generalstabs
Montenegro	Chief of the General Staff		Montenegrin: Начелник Генералштаба / Načelnik Generalštaba
Netherlands	Chief of Defence		Dutch: Commandant der Strijdkrachten
North Macedonia	Chief of the General Staff		Macedonian: Началник на Генералштабот
Norway	Chief of Defence		Norwegian: Forsvarssjefen
Poland	Chief of the General Staff		Polish: Szef Sztabu Generalnego
Portugal	Chief of Staff the Armed Forces		Portuguese: Chefe do Estado-Maior-General das Forças Armadas
Romania	Chief of Defence	Chief of the General Staff	Romanian: Șef al Statului Major General
Slovakia	Chief of the General Staff		Slovak: Náčelník generálneho štábu
Slovenia	Chief of the General Staff		Slovene: Načelnik Generalštaba
Spain	Chief of the Defence Staff		Spanish: Jefe del Estado Mayor de la Defensa
Sweden	Chief of Defence		Swedish: Överbefälhavaren
Turkey	Chief of the General Staff	Commander of the Armed Forces	Turkish: Genelkurmay Başkanı
United Kingdom	Chief of the Defence Staff		
United States	Chairman of the Joint Chiefs of Staff		

In 2018 Slovenia appointed the first female Major General Alenka Ermenc to hold such a position in the history of NATO and Slovenia.

== CHOD positions by non-NATO EU country ==
Within the EU member states that are not members of NATO, the following national positions are the CHOD positions.

Country	Position	Alternative translations	Term in national language used for the position
Austria	Chief of the General Staff		German: Chef des Generalstabes
Cyprus	Chief of the National Guard		Greek: Αρχηγοί Εθνικής Φρουράς
Ireland	Chief of Staff		Irish: Ceann Foirne na bhFórsaí Cosanta
Malta	Commander of the Armed Forces of Malta		Maltese: Kmandant tal-Forzi Armati ta’ Malta

== Other Chief of Defence positions by (non-NATO and non-EU) country ==
Note that in many countries outside of NATO and EU, the concept of civilian control of the military is inapplicable. In some countries the minister of defence is often a senior military officer. However, the list below only lists CHOD equivalents and not defense ministers.

Country	Position	Alternative translations	Term in national language used for the position
Algeria	Chief of Staff of the People's National Army	Chief of the Defence Staff	Arabic: رئيس أركان الجيش الوطني الشعبي
Argentina	Chief of the Joint Chiefs of Staff		Spanish: Jefe del Estado Mayor Conjunto
Armenia	Chief of the General Staff		Armenian: Գլխավոր շտաբի պետ
Australia	Chief of the Defence Force		
Azerbaijan	Chief of the General Staff		Azerbaijani: Silahlı Qüvvələri Baş Qərargah rəisi
Bangladesh	Principal Staff Officer of Armed Forces Division		Bengali: সশস্ত্র বাহিনী বিভাগের প্রিন্সিপাল স্টাফ অফিসার
Belarus	Chief of General Staff of the Armed Forces		Belarusian: Начальнік Генеральнага штаба Узброеных Сіл; Russian: Начальник Генерального штаба Вооружённых Сил
Botswana	Commander of the Defence Force		
Brazil	Chief of the Joint Staff of the Armed Forces		Portuguese: Chefe do Estado Maior Conjunto das Forças Armadas
Chile	Chief of the Joint Chiefs of Defence		Spanish: Jefe del Estado Mayor Conjunto de la Defensa
China	Chief of Staff of the Joint Staff Department of the Central Military Commission	Chief of General Staff; Commanding General of the People's Liberation Army General Staff Department	Chinese: 中央军事委员会联合参谋部参谋长
Colombia	General Commander of the Military Forces		Spanish: Comandante General de las Fuerzas Militares
Ecuador	Chief of the Joint Command of the Armed Forces		Spanish: Jefe del Comando Conjunto de las Fuerzas Armadas
Ethiopia	Chief of General Staff		Amharic: ጦር ኃይሎች ጠቅላይ ሹም
Gambia	Chief of the Defence Staff		
Georgia	Chief of General Staff		Georgian: თავდაცვის ძალების გენერალური შტაბის უფროსი
Ghana	Chief of the Defence Staff		
Guatemala	Chief of the General Staff		Spanish: Jefe del Estado Mayor
India	Chief of Defence Staff		Hindi: रक्षा प्रमुख
Indonesia	Commander of the National Armed Forces		Indonesian: Panglima Tentara Nasional Indonesia
Iran	Chief of General Staff		Persian: ستاد کل نیروهای مسلح
Iraq	Chief of the General Staff		Arabic: رئاسة اركان الجيش
Israel	Chief of the General Staff		Hebrew: ראש המטה הכללי
Jamaica	Chief of Defence Staff		
Japan	Chief of Staff, Joint Staff		Japanese: 統合幕僚長
Kazakhstan	Chief of the General Staff		Kazakh: Бас штабының бастығы / Bas ştabynyñ bastyğy Russian: Начальник Генерального штаба
Kyrgyzstan	Chief of the General Staff		Kyrgyz: Башкы штабынын башчысы Russian: Начальник Генерального штаба
Malaysia	Chief of Defence Forces		Malay: Panglima Angkatan Tentera
Moldova	Chief of the General Staff		Romanian: Șef al Marelui Stat Major
Monaco	Superior Commander of the Public Services		French: Le Commandant supérieur de la Force publique
Myanmar	Commander-in-Chief of Defence Services		Burmese: တပ်မတော်ကာကွယ်ရေးဦးစီးချုပ်
New Zealand	Chief of Defence Force		
Nigeria	Chief of the Defence Staff		
Nepal	Chief of Army Staff		Nepali: प्रधानसेनापति
North Korea	Chief of the General Staff of the Korean People's Army		Korean: 조선인민군 총참모장
Pakistan	Chief of Defence Forces		
Peru	Head of the Joint Command of the Armed Forces		Spanish: Jefe del Comando Conjunto de las Fuerzas Armadas
Philippines	Chief of Staff of the Armed Forces		Tagalog: Hepe ng Sandatahang Lakas
Russia	Chief of the General Staff		Russian: Начальник Генерального штаба
San Marino	Superior Commander of the Militias		Italian: Comandante Superiore delle Milizie
Serbia	Chief of the General Staff		Serbian: Начелник Генералштаба
Singapore	Chief of Defence Force		Chinese: 三军总长
Somalia	Chief of Armed Forces		Somali: Taliyaha Xooga Qalabka
South Africa	Chief of the National Defence Force		
South Korea	Chairman of the Joint Chiefs of Staff		Korean: 합동참모의장
South Sudan	Chief of Defense Forces		
Switzerland	Chief of the Armed Forces		French: Chef de l'Armée; German: Chef der Armee; Italian: Capo dell'Esercito; Romansh: Schef da l'Armada
Syria	Chief of the General Staff		Arabic: رئيس هيئة الأركان العامة للجيش والقوات المسلحة
Taiwan	Chief of the General Staff		Chinese: 參謀總長
Tajikistan	Chief of the General Staff		Tajik: Сардори Ситоди генералӣ
Thailand	Chief of the Defence Forces	Commander of the Royal Thai Armed Forces Headquarters	Thai: ผู้บัญชาการทหารสูงสุด
Turkmenistan	Chief of the General Staff		Turkmen: Ýaragly Güýçleriniň Baş ştabynyň başlygy
Ukraine	Commander-in-Chief of the Armed Forces of Ukraine		Ukrainian: Головнокомандувач Збройних сил України
Uzbekistan	Chief of the General Staff of the Ministry of Defence		Uzbek: Mudofaa vazirligining Bosh shtabi boshlig'i
Uruguay	Chief of the Defence Staff		Spanish: Jefe del Estado Mayor de la Defensa
Vatican City	Commander of the Pontifical Swiss Guard		German: Kommandant der Päpstlichen Schweizergarde; French: Commandant de la Garde Suisse Pontificale; Italian: Comandante della Guardia Svizzera Pontificia; Latin: Praefecti Pontificalis Custodiae Helveticae
Vietnam	Chief of the Staff	Chief of the General Staff of the People's Army of Vietnam	Vietnamese: Tổng Tham mưu trưởng Quân đội Nhân dân
