= J. A. Beleza Ferraz =

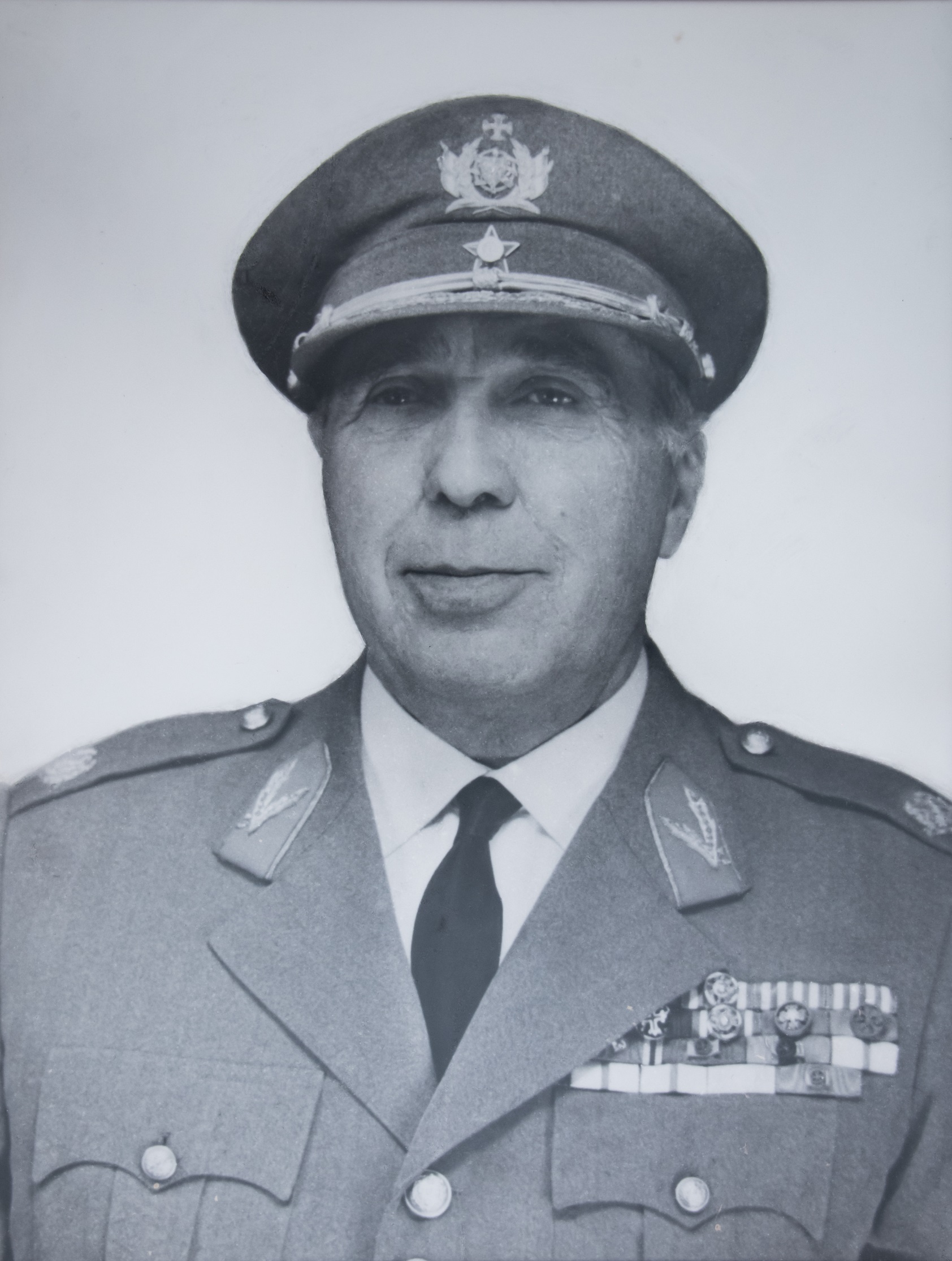
Official portrait, c. 1958–1961

General José António da Rocha Beleza Ferraz (born 9 September 1901) was chief of the general staff of the Portuguese armed forces from 1958 to 1961 and chairman of the NATO Military Committee from 1959 to 1960.
