= Luís Araújo =

Portuguese general (1949–2023)

General Luís Araújo
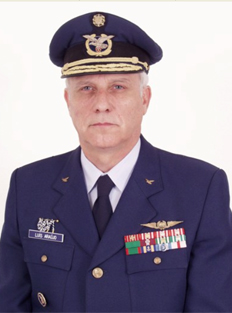
- Araújo as a Chief of Staff of the Portuguese Air Force
- Born: 25 February 1949; Porto, Portugal
- Died: 2 December 2023 (aged 74); Cascais, Portugal
- Military career
- Allegiance: Portugal
- Branch: Airforce
- Service years: 1966–2011
- Rank: General
- Awards: Grand Cross of the Military Order of Christ (2014); War Cross (Class II) (Note: Portuguese: Cruz de Guerra Class II – Device is a gold cross) (Portugal) (1977)

General Luís Evangelista Esteves de Araújo (25 February 1949 – 2 December 2023) was a Portuguese military officer who served as the Chief of Staff of the Portuguese Air Force and as Chief of the General Staff of the Armed Forces from 2011 to 6 February 2014.

Araújo was decorated with the Grand Cross of the Military Order of Christ in 2014.

Araújo died on 2 December 2023, at the age of 74.

== Military Service ==
- 1966 – 1971: Portuguese Military Academy
- October 1972 – October 1974: Flew 1000 hours operational duty over the north of Mozambique in an Alouette III
