= European Union Military Staff =

Directorate-general of the EU's External Action Service

Coordinates: 50°50′43″N 4°23′25″E

- Coat of arms
- Active: 2004–present
- Allegiance: European Union
- Type: Military staff
- Role: Supervises CSDP operations, provides strategic advice to the High Representative, reports to the EUMC.
- Size: 200+ personnel
- Part of: European External Action Service
- Location: Avenue de Cortenbergh 150, Brussels, Belgium
- Website: europa.eu

Commanders
- High Repr.: Kaja Kallas
- Director General: Lt. General Michiel van der Laan
- Deputy Director General: Major General Gábor Horváth

The Military Staff of the European Union (EUMS) is the directorate-general of the European Union's (EU) External Action Service (EEAS) that contributes to the EU's Common Security and Defence Policy (CSDP) by providing strategic advice to the High Representative (HR/VP) and commanding operations through its Military Planning and Conduct Capability (MPCC) operational headquarters. From the end of 2020, the MPCC will be capable of running executive operations of up to 2,500 troops, i.e. the size of one EU battle group, as well as 3 non-executive missions.

The EUMS also reports to the European Union Military Committee (EUMC), representing member states' Chiefs of Defence, and performs "early warning", situation assessment and strategic planning.

The EUMS currently consists of 200+ military and civilian personnel, and is located in the Kortenberg building in Brussels.

== History ==
The location of the Kortenberg building in Brussels

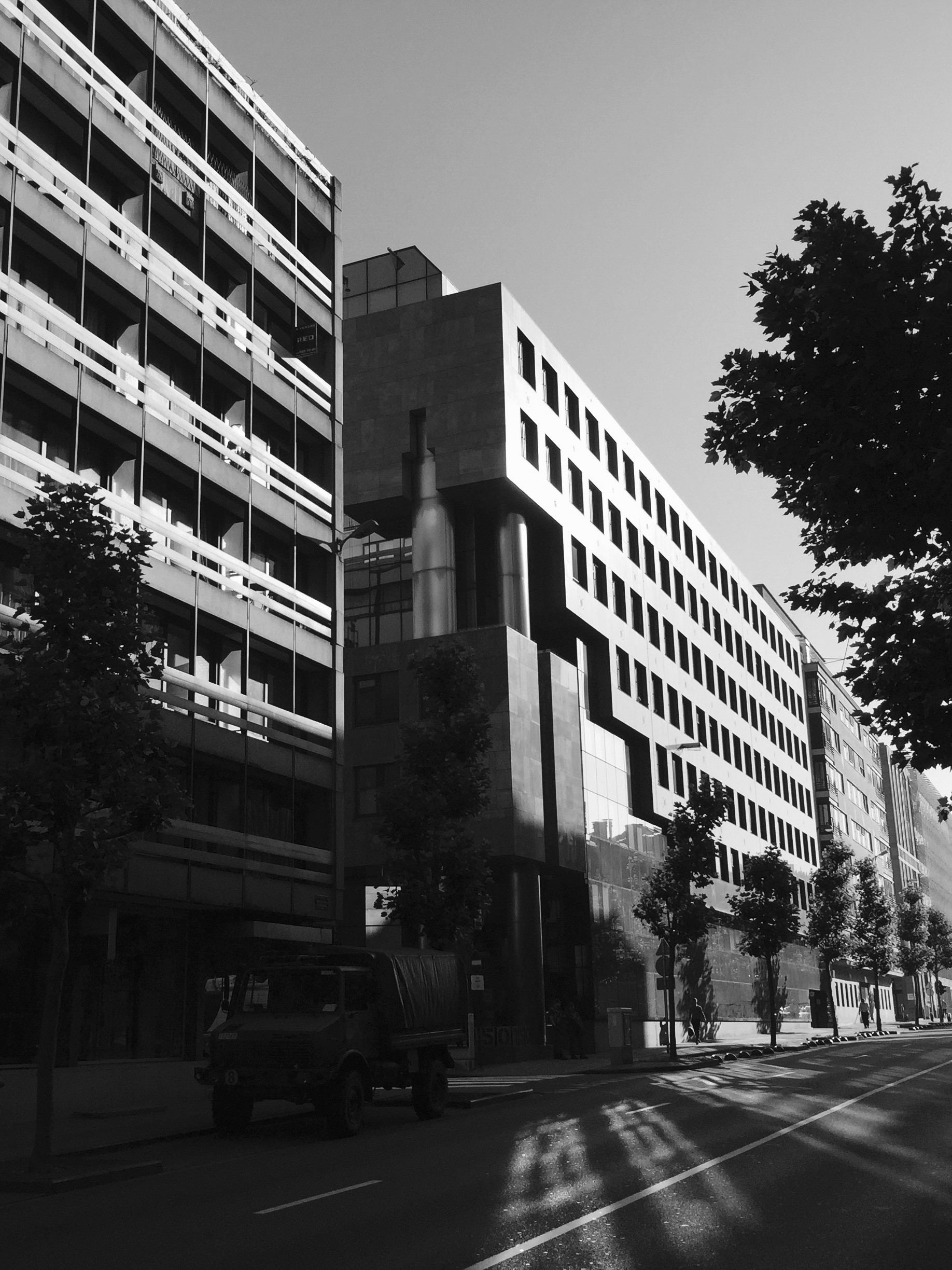
Kortenberg building

=== 1993–2000: Background ===
The Common Foreign and Security Policy (CFSP) was introduced as a pillar of the EU by the Treaty of Maastricht in 1993, based on the earlier 1970 European Political Cooperation (EPC). The CFSP was to include ‘all questions related to the security of the Union, including the eventual framing of a common defence policy, which might in time lead to a common defence’.

In December 1998 the Franco-British Saint-Malo declaration stated that the EU ‘must have the capacity for autonomous action, backed up by credible military forces, the means to decide to use them, and a readiness to do so, in order to respond to international crises’. This marked a British change of course, as it previously had blocked any development of EU autonomous military capabilities.

At the European Council in Cologne in June 1999 the European Security and Defence Identity (ESDI) - formed in 1996 as a project between Western European Union's (WEU) and the North Atlantic Treaty Organisation (NATO) - was transferred to the EU and renamed the European Security and Defence Policy (ESDP). The main goal of this newly established CSDP was to deal with crisis management outside EU territory.

=== 2001: Creation as a Council body ===
In 2000 and 2001 a number of Council bodies were established as part of the ESDP:

- Political and Security Committee (PSC), a preparatory body of ambassadorial level representatives thar observes the international situation, helps to define CFSP and ESDP policies and prepares a coherent EU response to a crisis
- EU Military Committee (EUMC), the Council's highest military body, composed of member states' Chiefs of Defence, who are regularly represented by their permanent military representatives. The EUMC provides the PSC with advice and recommendations on all military matters within the EU.
- European Union Military Staff (EUMS), a part of the General Secretariat whose primary task was to by EUMC's working and advisory body

In 2003 the Treaty of Nice provided the ESDP's legal foundation, in terms of competences, organisation, structures and assets.

=== 2009: Transfer to the External Action Service ===
Upon the entry into force of the Treaty of Lisbon in 2009 the EUMS was transferred from the Council's General Secretariat to become a Directorate-General (DG) of the newly established European External Action Service (EEAS) - the EU's diplomatic service, a hybrid Council-Commission body resulting from a merger of the external relations departments of the Council and relevant international relations departments of the European Commission.

=== 2016: Addition of the MPCC ===
In 2016 European Union Global Strategy was presented by HR Federica Mogherini and welcomed by the European Council. The implementation of this strategy in the field of CSDP has included the establishment of the Military Planning and Conduct Capability (MPCC), which gives the EUMS the role of commanding operations directly.

== Task ==
The EUMS performs a supervisory function in relation to Common Security and Defence Policy (CSDP) operations:

- providing strategic advice to the High Representative
- reporting to the European Union Military Committee (EUMC)
- performing "early warning, situation assessment and strategic planning for Petersberg tasks" and to implement CSDP missions (2001/80/CFSP, annex article 2) such as EUFOR Althea and the other European Union Force missions in Chad/CAR and the DR Congo.

The EUMS has supervised a number of deployments since its establishment.

== Structure ==
The relationship between the High Representative, the Military Staff and Military Committee as of November 2017: Colour key:
High Representative (a Vice-President of the Commission)
Military Committee (EUMC; a Council body)
Military Staff (EUMS; a Directorate-General of the External Action Service)

High Representative
Chairman EUMC
Working Group
Working Group/Headline Goal Task Force	Director General EUMS/ Director MPCC
Legal advisor	Deputy Director General	Horizontal Coordination
Assistant Chief of Staff for Synchronisation	EU cell at SHAPE	EU Liaison at the UN in NY	Assistant Chief of Staff for External Relations	NATO Permanent Liaison Team
Concepts & Capabilities; Directorate	Intelligence; Directorate	Operations; Directorate	Logistics; Directorate	Communications & Information Systems; Directorate	Military Planning and Conduct Capability (MPCC) Chief of Staff Working Group Current Operations

The EUMS is a Directorate-General of the External Action Service (EADS) that is located in the Kortenberg building in Brussels and currently consists of 200+ military and civilian personnel.

=== Director General ===
The EUMS is led by the Director General (DGEUMS, a three-star general).

Since 2017 DGEUMS has also served as Director of the Military Planning and Conduct Capability, and as such assumes the function of the single commander for all non-executive military missions, exercising command and control over the current three training Missions and other possible future non-executive military Missions.

DGEUMS is assisted by the Deputy Director General and the Chef of Staff (DDG/COS, a two-star general).

=== Military Planning and Conduct Capability ===
The Military Planning and Conduct Capability (MPCC) is an EUMS facility that provides a permanent operational headquarters at the military strategic level for military operations. The MPCC reports to the Political and Security Committee (PSC) and informing the European Union Military Committee (EUMC).

Presently the MPCC may only run non-executive operations. By the end of 2020 the MPCC will also be capable of running executive operations of up to 2500 troops, i.e. the size of one battle group.

The MPCC cooperates with its existing civilian counterpart, the Civilian Planning and Conduct Capability (CPCC), through a Joint Support Coordination Cell (JSCC).

=== Directorates ===
The EUMS has five directorates, each led by a one-star commander.

==== Concepts and Capabilities ====
The Concepts and Capabilities Directorate (CON/CAP) is responsible for EUMS concepts, doctrine and the planning and development of capabilities including crisis management exercises, training, analysis and lessons learned, and for cooperation with the European Defence Agency (EDA), ensuring coherency between the EU military concepts and the crisis management procedures.

==== Intelligence ====
The Intelligence Directorate (INT) has the following tasks:

- To provide intelligence input to early warning and situation assessment
- To contribute to the EUMS planning through the provision of intelligence and intelligence planning expertise
- To provide the intelligence input to crisis response planning and assessment for operations and exercises.

==== Operations ====
The Operations Directorate (OPS) has the following tasks:

- To plan military crisis management operations, including post-launch strategic crisis response planning
- To develop strategic advance and crisis response planning, including early military assessment and planning in support of informed decision making
- To monitor all CSDP operations and to generate the capacity to plan and run an autonomous operation.

==== Logistics ====
The Logistics Directorate (LOG) provides administrative support, logistic planning expertise, logistic concepts, doctrine related to crisis response planning. LOG also assesses operations and exercises.

==== Communication and Information Systems ====
The Communication and Information Systems Directorate (CIS) has the following tasks:

- To develop the EUMS' policies and guidance for implementation, operation and maintenance of communication and information systems, in support of CSDP activities.
- To contribute to EUMS planning through the provision of CIS planning expertise at the strategic and operational level
- To provide the CIS element of crisis response planning and assessment for operations and exercises.

=== Other units ===
Other units at the EUMS include:

- ACOS Synchronisation unit, which assists the Chief of Staff in the coordination and synchronization of the EUMS internal processes and information flows, to facilitate and canalise the support the EUMS provides to the Chairman of the EUMC, and to support him in the preparation and management of meetings.
- ACOS external relations unit, which develops policy for, and maintain the military dimension of, all EUMS' external relations in close cooperation with EEAS Management Directorates and the CMPD. This involves coordinating military-to-military cooperation with International Organisations, Strategic Partners; and Third States. The office is also responsible for all Public Information/Press Relations issues in close collaboration with the EEAS Strategic Communications Division.
- EU cell at SHAPE (EUCS), a unit that prepares for EU operations having recourse to NATO common assets and capabilities under Berlin plus arrangements and to support DSACEUR in his role as a potential operational commander for an EU-led operation. It contributes to full transparency between NATO and the EU embodying their strategic partnership in crisis management.

== Role in command and control of missions ==
The EU command and control (C2) structure is directed by political bodies composed of member states' representatives, and generally requires unanimous decisions. As of April 2019:

Liaison: Advice and recommendations Support and monitoring Preparatory work

Political strategic level:^{[5]}
ISS	EUCO Pres. (EUCO)	Chain of command
Coordination/support
SatCen	CIVCOM	HR/VP (FAC)
INTCEN	HR/VP (PMG)	HR/VP (PSC)^{[6]}	CEUMC (EUMC)
CMPD	DGEUMS^{[3]} (EUMS)
Military/civilian strategic level:
Dir MPCC^{[3]} (MPCC)	JSCC	Civ OpCdr CPCC^{[1]}
Operational level:
MFCdr^{[4]} (MFHQ)	HoM^{[1]}
Tactical level:
CC^{[2]}Air; CC^{[2]} Land; CC^{[2]} Mar; Other CCs^{[2]} European Armed Forces

^{1} In the event of a CSDP Civilian Mission also being in the field, the relations with the Civilian Planning and Conduct Capability (CPCC) and its Civilian Operation Commander (Civ OpCdr), as well as the subordinate Head of Mission (HoM), are coordinated as shown.

^{2} Other Component Commanders (CCs) and service branches which may be established.

^{3} The MPCC is part of the EUMS and Dir MPCC is double-hatted as DGEUMS. Unless the MPCC is used as Operation Headquarters (OHQ), either a national OHQ offered by member states or the NATO Command Structure (NCS) would serve this purpose. In the latter instance, Deputy Supreme Allied Commander Europe (DSACEUR), rather than Dir MPCC, would serve as Operation Commander (OpCdr).

^{4} Unless the MPCC is used as Operation Headquarters (OHQ), the MFCdr would be known as a Force Commander (FCdr), and direct a Force Headquarters (FHQ) rather than a MFHQ. Whereas the MFHQ would act both on the operational and tactical level, the FHQ would act purely on the operational level.

^{5} The political strategic level is not part of the C2 structure per se, but represents the political bodies, with associated support facilities, that determine the missions' general direction. The Council determines the role of the High Representative (HR/VP), who serves as Vice-President of the European Commission, attends European Council meetings, chairs the Foreign Affairs Council (FAC) and may chair the Political and Security Committee (PSC) in times of crisis. The HR/VP proposes and implements CSDP decisions.

^{6} Same composition as Committee of Permanent Representatives (COREPER) II, which also prepares for the CSDP-related work of the FAC.

== See also ==
- Common Security and Defence Policy
- European Union Operations Centre
- European External Action Service
- Military of the European Union
- Political and Security Committee
- European Union Military Committee
- International Military Staff
