= Emmanouel Theodorou =

Emmanouel Theodorou (Greek: Εμμανουήλ Θεοδώρου; born 1967) is a Greek lieutenant general and the current chief of the National Guard General Staff of the Cypriot National Guard. He was born in Komotini, Greece, in 1967, and traces his family ancestry to the island of Samos. He graduated from the Hellenic Military Academy in 1988, being commissioned into the Infantry. On 9 October 2025, following a decision by the Council of Ministers, Theodorou was appointed as chief of the National Guard General Staff.
