= Ministry of Defense (Cyprus) =

The Ministry of Defence of Cyprus (Greek: Υπουργείο Άμυνας) is the defense ministry of Cyprus, responsible for managing the Cypriot National Guard. It is headquartered in Nicosia, in the Municipality of Strovolos. It was established in 1960. During the period 1964-1985, the Minister of Defence was also the Minister of Interior. The current minister is Vasilis Palmas, since 10 March 2024.

== See also ==
- Official Website
