= European Union Operations Centre =

- EUMS coat of arms
- Active: 2012–2016
- Allegiance: European Union
- Type: Operational headquarters

Commanders
- High Repr.: Federica Mogherini
- Head: Francisco Cornago Diufain

The European Union Operations Centre (EU OPCEN) was an ad-hoc, non-standing, non-commanding headquarters facilitating the planning and conduct of military operations deployed as part of the European Union's (EU) Common Security and Defence Policy (CFSP) that was active between 2012 and 2016.

The OPCEN would be operational five days following a decision by the Council, and reach its full capability to command the operation after twenty days, at the latest.

The EU OPCEN was not formally part of the EU’s chains of command.

From 2020, the OPCEN's role in executive operations will be transferred to the Military Planning and Conduct Capability.

== Mandate and tasks ==
According to the Council Decision, the Mandate and tasks of the EU OPCEN are:

The EU Operations Centre shall provide support in the field of operational planning and conduct of the CSDP missions and operation in the Horn of Africa and in the Sahel region with a view to increasing efficiency and synergies for CSDP within both regions. In this framework the EU Operations Centre shall facilitate information exchange, improve coordination and strengthen civil-military synergies.

— Council Decision

- To provide, using its military and specialised planning expertise, direct support to the Civilian Operations Commander for the operational planning and conduct of the civilian missions in the Horn of Africa and in the Sahel region.
- To provide support to the military Missions and Operation Commanders in the Horn of Africa and in the Sahel region.
- To provide support to the Crisis Management and Planning Directorate (CMPD), at its request, in its strategic planning for CSDP missions and operation in the Horn of Africa and in the Sahel region.
- To facilitate interaction between the respective CSDP missions and operation and the Brussels-based structures. In relation to the "train and equip" pilot cases in Mali and Somalia, the EU OPCEN may usefully provide support to a functional coordination mechanism, in view of its implementation plan.
- To facilitate coordination and improve synergies amongst the CSDP missions and operation in the Horn of Africa, in the context of the Horn of Africa strategy and in liaison with the European Union Special Representative for the Horn of Africa and the European Union Special Envoy for Somalia.
- To facilitate coordination and improve synergies amongst the CSDP missions in the Sahel region, in the context of the Sahel Strategy in liaison with the European Union Special Representative for the Sahel.

== Structure ==
An EU OPCEN that is activated for a particular predominantly military operation may consist of a total of 103 officers and civilians who start planning after five days following a deployment decision by the Council. The EU OPCEN would reach its full capability to command the operation after twenty days, at the latest.

The staff of an activated EU OPCEN is composed of:

- Chief of Staff; the present Operations Directorate Branch Chief OPSCEN/WKC (Watch-keeping Capability) of the European Union Military Staff (EUMS), appointed by the Council
- Support Cells based in Brussels:
  - the permanent core team (the four permanent staff)
  - double-hatted personnel from the European External Action Service (EEAS), including the European Union Military Staff (EUMS), the Management and Planning Directorate (CMPD), the Civilian Planning and Conduct Capability (CPCC) and the geographical desks
- sixteen personnel seconded by member states

The present EU OPCEN Chief of Staff is Captain Francisco Cornago Diufain. Diufain succeeded the first head, Captain Ad van der Linde.

== History ==
In December 2004 the European Union Military Staff (EUMS) was tasked by the European Council to be ready to set up an EU OPCEN capable of planning and conducting an operation, in particular where a joint civil/military response is required and where no national HQ is identified. The responsibility for assuring this capability lies with the OPSCEN/WKC (Watching Keeping Capacity) Branch of the EUMS Operations Directorate. Since 1 January 2007, the EU Operation Centre is ready for activation by the Council for the conduct of autonomous operations.

EU OPCEN was first activated on 23 March 2012 by the Foreign Affairs Council in relation to three CSDP operations in the Horn of Africa. This mandate was later extended until the end of 2016 and expanded the geographical and functional scope to the entire Sahel region.

== See also ==
- Common Security and Defence Policy
  - Operational headquarters of the European Union
  - European Union Military Staff
    - Military Planning and Conduct Capability
