= João Cartaxo Alves =

Portuguese general

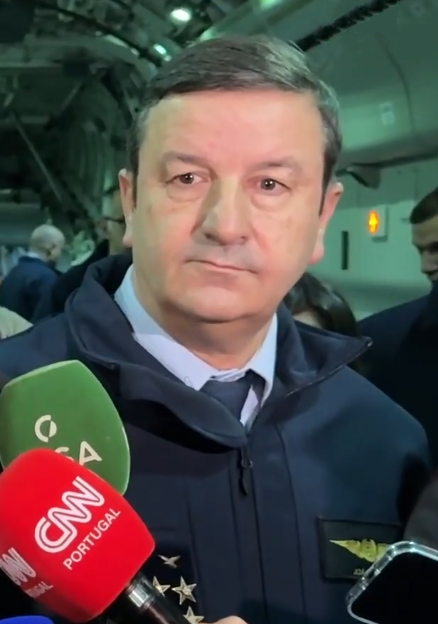
- Alves in 2026
- Born: João Guilherme Rosado Cartaxo Alves; December 26, 1962 (age 63); Almada, Lisbon, Portugal
- Education: Portuguese Air Force Academy (BS)
- Military career
- Allegiance: Portugal
- Branch: Portuguese Air Force
- Service years: 1984–present
- Rank: General
- Commands: Chief of the General Staff; Chief of Staff of the Portuguese Air Force; Air Force Logistics Command; Air Force Training Directorate; Air Base No. 6; 61 Operational Wing; 501 Squadron
- Conflicts: Bosnian War (IFOR, SFOR); Kosovo Force (KFOR); 1997 Albanian civil unrest (Operation Alba); 1999 East Timorese crisis (UNTAET); War in Afghanistan (ISAF)

João Cartaxo Alves (born 26 December 1962) is a Portuguese Air Force general who currently serves as the Chief of the General Staff of the Portuguese Armed Forces, having taken office on 1 March 2026. Alves' previous posts include the Chief of Staff of the Portuguese Air Force from February 2022 to February 2026, commander of the Air Force Logistics Command from May 2019 to February 2022, and as director of the Air Force Training Directorate from October 2014 to July 2015. He also formerly served as commander of the Air Base No. 6 (Montijo Air Base) from September 2008 to October 2010, and as commander of the 61 Operational Wing.

Alves entered the Portuguese Air Force Academy in 1980 and later got his pilot wings in 1985, where he eventually served under various commands in the Air Force, primarily as a transport pilot flying the CASA C-212 Aviocar and Lockheed C-130H Hercules. Alves also has 9,000 flying hours and was deployed in overseas missions such as in Bosnia and Herzegovina, Kosovo, Albania, Timor Leste, and Afghanistan.

== Early life and education ==
Alves was born in Almada, Lisbon on 26 December 1962. He eventually entered the Portuguese Air Force Academy in October 1980 and completed the Military Aeronautical Sciences Course in 1984. He later managed to complete his pilot training at the Sintra Air Base (Air Base No. 1). Alvez also completed the Fighter Complementary Course in January 1986, where he flew the Lockheed T-33 trainer jet under the 103 Squadron, and a few months later, he completed his Multi-Engine Aircraft Complementary Course at the Tancos Air Base and flew the CASA C-212 Aviocar under the 111 Squadron. Alvez also took the Air Warfare General Course at the Portuguese Air Force Academy Higher Studies Institute in 1993 to 1994, as well as the General Promotion Course in 2010 to 2011.

== Military career ==
Alvez began his officer career in 1986 and was placed in the 502 Squadron and later got his qualifications for the C-212 Aviocar as pilot-in-command and later as an Electronic and Intelligence Warfare Officer until 1991. In January 1992, Alvez was moved to 501 Squadron and later became both as pilot-in-command and instructor pilot of the Lockheed C-130H Hercules, and after completing the Air Warfare General Course, he later became an Operations Officer of the squadron from 1995 to September 1997, where he was deployed to Bosnia to serve under the IFOR during the Bosnian War and in Albania to aid the Albanian government during the 1997 Albanian civil unrest under Operation Alba. He later led the Accident Prevention Office at the Air Base No. 6.

In April 1998, Alvez was named as commander of the 501 Squadron and was later promoted to the rank of lieutenant colonel. During his stint as squadron commander, he was deployed to both Bosnia and Kosovo to serve under Portuguese forces in SFOR and Kosovo Force (KFOR). Alvez was also later deployed to Timor Leste to assist Portuguese forces under the UNTAET amidst the 1999 East Timorese crisis. Alvez was also deployed to Afghanistan to assist Portuguese transport missions during the War in Afghanistan under the International Security Assistance Force (ISAF). Alvez would later end his term as squadron commander of the 501 Squadron in June 2002, and he eventually became the wing commander of the 61 Operational Wing.

In 2003, Alvez later served as the Chief of Planning Department (A5) of the Air Force Operational Command, before being moved to NATO as an Air Policy Staff Officer under the RFAS (Reaction Force Air Staff) in Kalkar, Germany in August 2004. Alves eventually served as the Air Transportation Supervising Officer at the Joint Air Power Competence Centre of the NATO Centre of Excellence in 2005 and contributed to the integration of the Joint Air Power Competence Centre (JAPCC). Alvez rose to the rank of colonel in 2007 as he was named as Chief of Staff of the Operational Command. In September 2008 to 6 October 2010, Alves was named as base commander of the Air Base No. 6. In 2011, Alvez was named as the Head of Air Command Operations and as the Director of Operations of NATO Combined Air Operations Centre 10 at the Air Command.

Alvez was named as the Director of Operations at the NATO Combined Air Operations Centre and was later promoted to the rank of brigadier general in 2012, where he supervised the flow of operations of the newly-formed Combined Air Operations Centre. In 2014, Alvez was later promoted to the rank of major general and later served as the Director of the Air Force Training Directorate. In July 2015, Alves was named as the Second-in-Command of the Air Command and later filled the position as acting commander of the Air Command from February 2016 until October 2016. In October 2016, Alvez was named as the Head of the Air Force Chief of Staff Cabinet.

Alvez was named as the Director of Operations at the NATO Combined Air Operations Centre and was later promoted to the rank of brigadier general in 2012, where he supervised the flow of operations of the newly-formed Combined Air Operations Centre. In 2014, Alvez was later promoted to the rank of major general and later served as the Director of the Air Force Training Directorate, where he spearheaded the acquisition of amphibious aircraft for aerial firefighting missions and led to the procurement of the Canadair CL-415 firefighting planes. During his stint, he also laid out the acquisition of the Embraer C-390 Millennium transport planes from Brazil, and were eventually procured in 2019. In July 2015, Alves was named as the Second-in-Command of the Air Command and later filled the position as acting commander of the Air Command from February 2016 until October 2016. In October 2016, Alvez was named as the Head of the Air Force Chief of Staff Cabinet, and on 4 January 2018, Alvez was named as the Deputy General Director of the General Directorate of National Defense Resources. He also subsequently served as the national representative of the NATO Logistics Committee, the NATO Resource Policy and Planning Board, the Agency Supervisory Board of the NATO Support and Procurement Organization, the NATO Science & Technology Board of NATO, and the Long-Term Review of the European Defense Agency.

After his stint on the General Directorate of National Defense Resources, Alves was named in May 2019 as the commander of the Air Force Logistics Command, and was later promoted to the rank of lieutenant general. As the commander of the Logistics Command, he spearheaded the sustainment of the air force's maintenance, infrastructure, and logistical units, while also strengthening the command's cooperation activities with NATO. On 25 February 2022, Alvez was appointed as the Chief of Staff of the Portuguese Air Force, and eventually led the service force's modernization programs while also strengthening its interoperability operations with NATO countries. On March 1, 2026, Alves was named as the Chief of the General Staff of the Portuguese Armed Forces, and was eventually sworn in on the next day, 2 March 2026. During his assumption speech, Alves emphasized the need of a "interoperable and technologically advanced Armed Forces" that has " increased mobility, connectivity and an innovation-oriented approach". He also listed his key priorities on his term, which includes the continued integration of the armed forces, increase defense spending, modernize the armed forces' capabilities, and investing in people management.

== Awards from military service ==
- Grand Cross, Military Order of Aviz
- 4 Gold Grade and 2 Silver Grade, Military Medals for Distinguished Service
- 1st Class, National Defense Medal
- 1st Class, Naval Cross Medal
- 1st Class, D. Afonso Henriques Medal
- 1st Class, Aeronautic Merit Medal
- 1st and 2nd Class, Medalha de Mérito Militar
- Gold and Silver Classes, Medal for Exemplary Conduct/Behavior
- 4 Commemorative Medals for Special Service Commissions

=== Foreign honors ===
- Grand Officer, Order of Aeronautical Merit (Brazil)
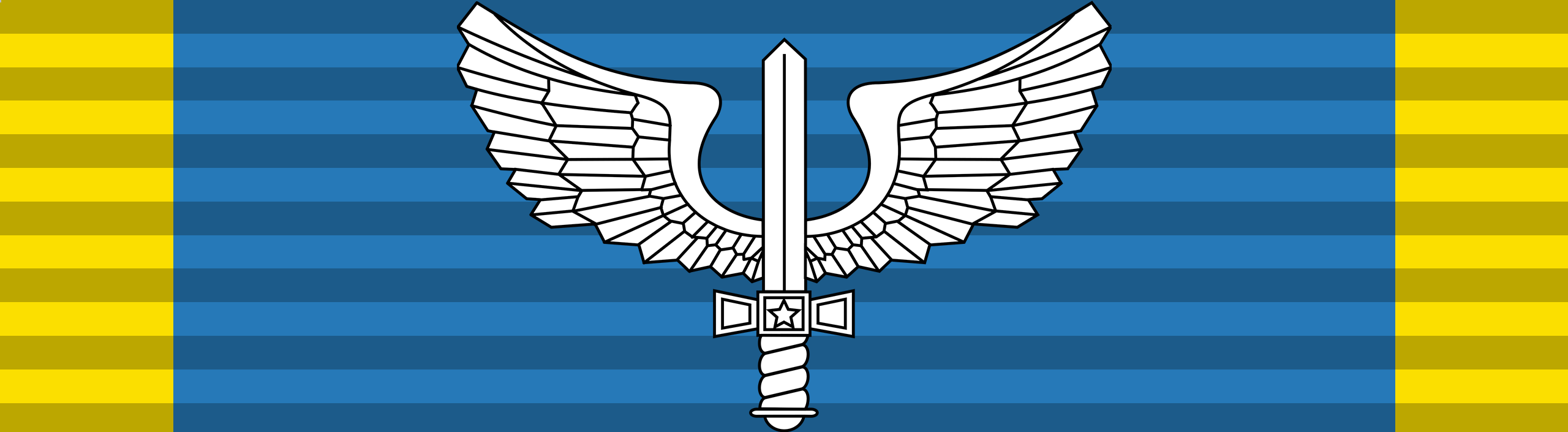
- Santos-Dumont Merit Medal (Brazil)
- Miguel Antonio Caro Symbolic Unity Medal (Colombia)
- Grand Cross - White Decoration, Cross of Aeronautical Merit (Spain)
- Royal Netherlands Air and Space Force Medal of Merit (Netherlands)

== Personal life ==
Alves is married and has two sons.
