= Chief of the National Guard General Staff =

Commander of the Cypriot National Guard

- Αρχηγός του Γενικού Επιτελείου Εθνικής Φρουράς
- Flag of the Cypriot National Guard General Staff
- Incumbent; Lt. General Emmanouel Theodorou since 9 October 2025
- Ministry of Defense
- Formation: 1964
- First holder: Georgios Karagiannis
- Website: Official website

The Chief of the National Guard General Staff (Greek: Αρχηγός του Γενικού Επιτελείου Εθνικής Φρουράς, abbrev. Α/ΓΕΕΦ) is the professional head of the Cypriot National Guard. He is responsible for the administration and the operational control of the Cypriot military. Due to the close links between the Republic of Cyprus and Greece, the office is always filled by a retired lieutenant general of the Hellenic Army. The current Chief of the National Guard is Lieutenant General Emmanouel Theodorou.

== List of Chiefs ==
Since its creation in 1964, these people have served as Chief of the National Guard:

No.	Picture	Chief of the National Guard	Took office	Left office	Time in office
1	Georgios Karagiannis	Lieutenant general Georgios Karagiannis	1 June 1964	12 August 1964	0 years
2	Ilias Prokos	Lieutenant general Ilias Prokos	13 August 1964	25 September 1967	2–3 years
3	Georgios Moronis	Lieutenant general Georgios Moronis	26 September 1967	10 June 1969	1–2 years
4	Ilias Gerakinis	Lieutenant general Ilias Gerakinis	11 June 1969	31 July 1970	0–1 years
5	Charalambos Charalambopoulos	Lieutenant general Charalambos Charalambopoulos	1 August 1970	9 August 1973	2–3 years
6	Georgios Denisis	Lieutenant general Georgios Denisis	10 August 1973	14 July 1974	0–1 years
7	Efthymios Karagiannis	Lieutenant general Efthymios Karagiannis	7 August 1974	9 March 1975	0–1 years
8	Ioannis Komninos	Lieutenant general Ioannis Komninos	10 March 1975	23 June 1981	5–6 years
9	Nikolaos Papanagiotou	Lieutenant general Nikolaos Papanagiotou	24 June 1981	29 August 1985	3–4 years
10	Dimitrios Matafias	Lieutenant general Dimitrios Matafias	30 August 1985	2 November 1986	0–1 years
11	Georgios Politis [el]	Lieutenant general Georgios Politis (born 1920)	3 November 1986	10 December 1988	1–2 years
12	Panagiotis Markopoulos	Lieutenant general Panagiotis Markopoulos (1916–1996)	11 December 1988	16 December 1991	2–3 years
13	Georgios Seiradakis	Lieutenant general Georgios Seiradakis	17 December 1991	31 December 1993	1–2 years
14	Nikolaos Vorvolakos	Lieutenant general Nikolaos Vorvolakos (1931–2014)	7 February 1994	25 April 1998	4 years
15	Dimitrios Dimou	Lieutenant general Dimitrios Dimou	25 April 1998	19 May 2000	2 years
16	Evangelos Florakis	Lieutenant general Evangelos Florakis (1943–2002)	19 May 2000	10 July 2002 †	2 years
17	Athanasios Nikolodimos	Lieutenant general Athanasios Nikolodimos	16 July 2002	11 January 2006	3 years
18	Konstantinos Bisbikas	Lieutenant general Konstantinos Bisbikas	11 January 2006	7 May 2009	3 years
19	Petros Tsalikidis	Lieutenant general Petros Tsalikidis	7 May 2009	11 July 2011	2 years
20	Stylianos Nasis	Lieutenant general Stylianos Nasis	21 July 2011	25 June 2014	2 years
21	Georgios Basiakoulis	Lieutenant general Georgios Basiakoulis	25 June 2014	31 March 2017	2 years
22	Ilias Leontaris	Lieutenant general Ilias Leontaris	31 March 2017	18 March 2020	2–3 years
23	Demokritos Zervakis	Lieutenant general Demokritos Zervakis	18 March 2020	8 September 2023	6 years
24	Georgios Tsitsikostas	Lieutenant general Georgios Tsitsikostas	8 September 2023	8 October 2025	2 years
25	Emmanouel Theodorou	Lieutenant general Emmanouel Theodorou	9 October 2025	Incumbent	2 years
