= António da Silva Ribeiro =

Portuguese Admiral

António Silva Ribeiro
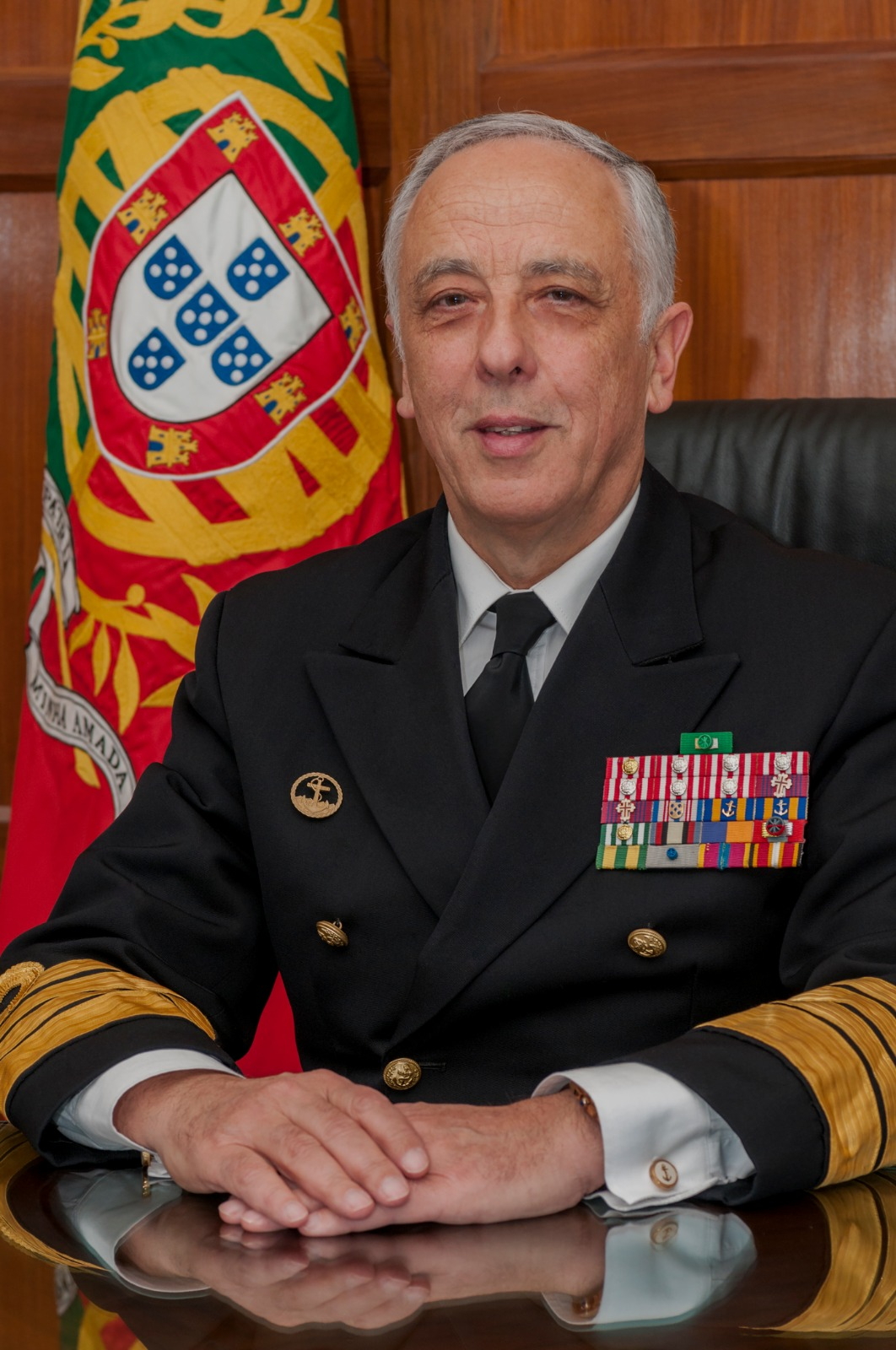
- Official portrait, 2018
- Born: António Manuel Fernandes da Silva Ribeiro; 14 October 1957 (age 68); Pombal, Portugal
- Allegiance: Portugal
- Branch: Portuguese Navy
- Service years: 1978–present
- Rank: Admiral
- Commands: Chief of the General Staff; Chief of the Naval Staff; Director, Maritime Authority System; Head of the Planning Division, Naval Staff; Superintendent of Material; General Director, Portuguese Hydrographic Institute; NRP Almeida Carvalho (A527)
- Education: Naval School

António Manuel Fernandes da Silva Ribeiro is a Portuguese admiral who served as the Chief of the General Staff of the Portuguese Armed Forces from 1 March 2018 to 30 April 2023.

== Education, academic accomplishments and memberships ==
Riberio joined the Naval School in 1974, and was promoted to midshipman prior to his graduation in 1978. He also holds a degree in hydrography and postgraduate studies, including a master's degree in Strategic Studies, a doctorate in political science and aggregation in strategic studies. He has completed various courses locally and abroad, such as the Naval Warfare General Course, the Naval Warfare Complementary Course and the Flag Officer's Promotion Course. He also serves as a professor with aggregation in strategic studies at the Social and Political Sciences Institute, and at the Portuguese Naval Academy.

He is a member of:

- Strategic Reflection Group of the National Defense Institute
- Center for Marine Studies
- Combatants League
- Security, Organized Crime and Terrorism Observatory
- Portuguese Center for Geopolitics
- Portuguese Military History Commission
- Naval Military Club
- Nautical Club of Navy Officers and Cadets
- Olivença Friends Group
- International Relations Magazine
- Military Sciences Magazine

He also serves as a member and a contributor to major defense magazines, such as the Military Magazine, the Nation and Defense Magazine, and the Security and Defense Magazine.

== Military Background ==
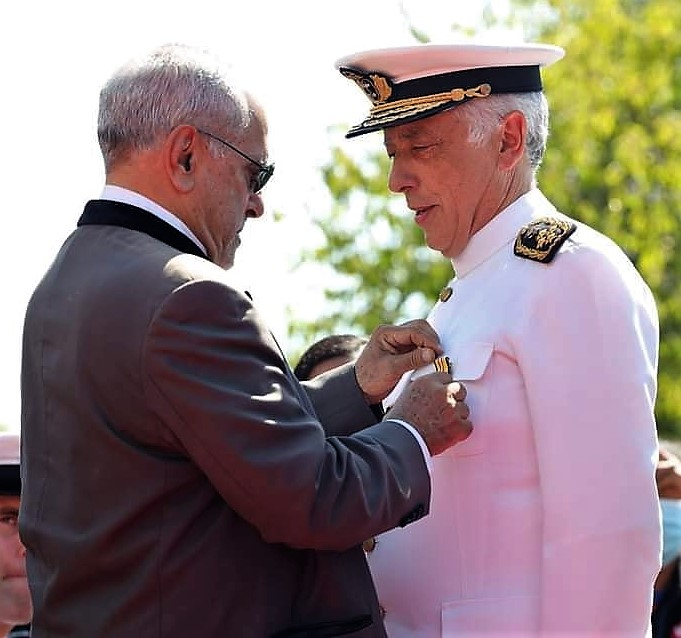
Admiral António da Silva Ribeiro receives the Medal of Merit of East Timor (2022)

During his junior years, he served as the deputy chief of the Navigation Service aboard the NRP São Gabriel (A5206) and also served as an executive officer aboard the NRP Save (P1161).

He served as the head of the Navigation Service of NRP Comandante João Belo (F480), and became the head of the Technical-Naval Studies Center, and also served as a representative in the Portuguese Association of Water and Hydraulic Resources.

He also served as the deputy of the technical director for the Cooperation with Portuguese-speaking African Countries, Head of the Nautical Publications Section, deputy of the head of the Coastal Dynamics Division at the Portuguese Hydrographic Institute. He also served as the commanding officer of the NRP Andromeda (A5203) and as deputy of the chief of the Department of Strategic and Military Studies at the General Directorate of National Defense Policy.

He also became the head of the Forces Planning Section at the Planning Division of the Naval Staff, became an adviser at the National Defense Institute, director of research and operations at the Strategic Defense and Military Information Service, and served as the commanding officer of the NRP Almeida Carvalho (A527). He also served as the general director, Portuguese Hydrographic Institute, became the coordinator of the strategy department and professor of strategy and strategic planning at the Superior Naval War Institute, and became the head of the Planning Division at the Naval Staff.

He also served as the general director of the Maritime Authority System and as commander of the Maritime Police. He also became the superintendent of material, the general director of the Hydrographic Institute, the deputy vice-chief of the Naval Staff, the secretary of the Admiralty Council and also served as a member of the Consultative Commission on Search and Rescue. He also served as the chief of the Naval Staff of the Portuguese Navy, before he was appointed by President Marcelo Rebelo de Sousa as the Chief of the General Staff on March 1, 2018, replacing Army General Artur Neves Pina Monteiro.

== Awards ==
His awards, commendations and honors from military service include:

- Grand Officer, Order of Aviz
- Commander, Brazilian Order of Naval Merit
- Brazilian Medal of Merit Tamandaré
- Officer, Ordre national du Mérite
- Gold, French National Defence Medal
- Order of Timor-Leste
- 6 Distinguished Service Medals
- 1st and 2nd Class, Military Merit Medals
- 2nd and 3rd Class, Naval Cross Medals
- Vasco da Gama's Naval Medal
- Gold and Silver, Exemplary Conduct Medal
- Gold, Prestige and Career Medal(awarded by the City Hall of Pombal)
- Medal of Merit (East Timor) (20 August 2022)
- Commander of the Order for Merits to Lithuania (14 February 2023)

=== Commendations and other honors ===
He also received numerous honors and commendations from various cities, organizations, and institutions, such as:

- Honorary Citizen of Gulfport, Mississippi
- 1992 Medal from the Journal "Revista Militar" (for his outstanding contribution to the prestige and projection of that institution)
- Admiral Barroso 1995 and 1996 of the Naval Military Club
- Admiral Pereira Crespo 1999 of the Journal "Revista da Armada"
- Admiral Augusto Osório 2000 of the Naval Military Club
- Commander Joaquim Costa 2001 of the journal "Revista da Armada"
- National Defense 2004 from the Minister of National Defense.

== Personal life ==
He currently lives at Seixal. He is also married and has two sons.
