= Armed Forces General Staff (Portugal) =

Supreme military body of Portugal

- Estado-Maior-General das Forças Armadas
- Rank flag for Chief of Staff of the Armed Forces
- Active: 1950–1974 (SGDN); 1974–present (EMGFA)
- Country: Portugal
- Branch: Armed forces
- Type: Military staff
- Part of: Portuguese Armed Forces
- Headquarters: Lisbon
- Mottos: Que quem quis sempre pôde ("Who wills aye finds a way", from The Lusiads, Canto IX, 95, v. 6)
- Engagements: Annexation of Goa; Portuguese Colonial War; IFOR; SFOR; EUFOR; KFOR; Afghanistan War; Peacekeaping missions Angola; Bosnia and Herzegovina; Croatia; North Macedonia; Western Sahara; Georgia; Lebanon
- Website: www.emgfa.pt

Commanders
- Current Chief: General João Cartaxo Alves

Insignia
- Abbreviation: EMGFA

The Armed Forces General Staff (Note: Portuguese: Estado-Maior-General das Forças Armadas) (EMGFA), is the supreme military body of Portugal. It is responsible for the planning, command and control of the Portuguese Armed Forces.

EMGFA is headed by the Chief of the General Staff of the Armed Forces (Note: Portuguese: Chefe do Estado-Maior-General das Forças Armadas) (CEMGFA), the highest rank of general in the Portuguese Armed Forces.

== History ==
In 1950, as part of the Portuguese military reforms related with the lessons learned following World War II, the start of the Cold War and the foundation of NATO, the roles of minister of National Defence and of Chief of the Armed Forces General Staff (CEMGFA) were created. The creation of these roles was a major step in the planned integration of the several military service branches and so the establishment of the Armed Forces of Portugal as a single organization. The CEMGFA assumed most of the responsibilities until then assigned to the military heads of the Navy and of the Army, the then existing service branches, as the Air Force would only be created in 1952.

At the same time and as a forerunner of a future General Staff, the Secretariat-General of National Defence (Portuguese: Secretariado-Geral da Defesa Nacional) or SGDN was established. The SGDN was the central planning organization of the Defence, being headed by the CEMGFA.

In 1969, it was decreed that SGDN should be remodelled in order to be transformed into the Armed Forces General Staff (EMGFA), as the organization for the joint administration of the Armed Forces. However, transformation of the SGDN into the EMGFA occurred only in 1974.

== Organization ==
The Armed Forces General Staff is integrated into the Portuguese Ministry of National Defence and includes:

- The Chief of the General Staff of the Armed Forces (CEMGFA)
- The Joint Staff (EMC, Estado-Maior Conjunto)
- The Joint Operational Command (COC, Comando Operacional Conjunto)
- The operational commands of the Azores and Madeira
- The commanders-in-chief that can be created under the CEMGFA, in times of war
- The Military Security and Information Center (CISMIL, Centro de Informações e Segurança Militares)
- The general support organizations

Under the dependency of the CEMGFA are also:

- The Portuguese Joint Command and Staff College (IESM, Instituto de Estudos Superiores Militares)
- The Hospital of the Armed Forces (HFAR, Hospital das Forças Armadas)

== Chief of the General Staff ==
The Chief of the General Staff of the Armed Forces is the operational commander of the Portuguese Armed Forces in times of peace. In times of war, he assumes the complete command of the Armed Forces. The CEMGFA is a general officer of one of the three branches of the Armed Forces (Army, Navy and Air Force), appointed by the President of Portugal, by proposal of the Government of Portugal.

=== List of chiefs of the General Staff ===
No.	Portrait	Chief	Took office	Left office	Time in office	Defence branch	Ref.
1	Aníbal César Valdez de Passos e Sousa [pt]	General; Aníbal César Valdez de Passos e Sousa (1884–1954)	5 August 1950	6 December 1951	1 year, 123 days	Portuguese Army	–
2	Manuel Ortins de Bettencourt [pt]	Rear admiral Manuel Ortins de Bettencourt (1892–1969)	12 December 1951	9 February 1955	3 years, 59 days	Portuguese Navy	–
3	Júlio Botelho Moniz	General; Júlio Botelho Moniz (1900–1979)	3 March 1955	13 August 1958	3 years, 163 days	Portuguese Army	–
4	José António da Rocha Beleza Ferraz	General; José António da Rocha Beleza Ferraz (1901–?)	22 August 1958	12 April 1961	2 years, 233 days	Portuguese Army	–
5	Manuel Gomes de Araújo [pt]	General; Manuel Gomes de Araújo (1897–1982)	13 April 1961	3 December 1962	1 year, 234 days	Portuguese Army	–
6	Venâncio Augusto Deslandes [pt]	General; Venâncio Augusto Deslandes (1909–1985)	16 August 1968	4 September 1972	4 years, 19 days	Portuguese Air Force	–
7	Francisco da Costa Gomes	General; Francisco da Costa Gomes (1914–2001) (Note: Dismissed because of refusal to swear loyalty to the Prime Minister Marcello Caetano in a public ceremony)	5 September 1972	13 March 1974	1 year, 189 days	Portuguese Army	–
8	Joaquim da Luz Cunha [pt]	General; Joaquim da Luz Cunha (1914–1992) (Note: Dismissed following the Carnation Revolution)	19 March 1974	28 April 1974	40 days	Portuguese Army	–
(7)	Francisco da Costa Gomes	General; Francisco da Costa Gomes (1914–2001) (Note: Simultaneously served as President of the National Salvation Junta (30 September 1974 – 14 March 1975), 15th President of Portugal (30 September 1974 – 13 July 1976) and President of the Revolutionary Council (14 March 1975 – 13 July 1976))	29 April 1974	13 July 1976	2 years, 75 days	Portuguese Army	–
9	António Ramalho Eanes	General; António Ramalho Eanes (born 1935) (Note: Simultaneously served as 16th President of Portugal (14 July 1976 – 9 March 1986) and President of the Revolutionary Council (14 July 1976 – 30 September 1982))	14 July 1976	16 February 1981	4 years, 217 days	Portuguese Army	–
10	Nuno Viriato Tavares de Melo Egídio	General; Nuno Viriato Tavares de Melo Egídio (1922–2011)	17 February 1981	18 February 1984	3 years, 1 day	Portuguese Army	–
11	José Lemos Ferreira [pt]	General; José Lemos Ferreira (1929–2020)	1 March 1984	8 March 1989	5 years, 7 days	Portuguese Air Force	–
12	António Soares Carneiro	General; António Soares Carneiro (1928–2014)	29 March 1989	25 January 1994	4 years, 302 days	Portuguese Army	–
13	António Carlos Fuzeta da Ponte [pt]	Admiral; António Carlos Fuzeta da Ponte (born 1935)	21 February 1994	9 March 1998	4 years, 16 days	Portuguese Navy	–
14	Gabriel Espírito Santo [pt]	General; Gabriel Espírito Santo (1936–2014)	17 March 1998	8 August 2000	2 years, 144 days	Portuguese Army	–
15	Manuel José Alvarenga de Sousa Santos [pt]	General; Manuel José Alvarenga de Sousa Santos (born 1940)	12 August 2000	23 August 2002	2 years, 11 days	Portuguese Air Force	–
16	José Manuel Garcia Mendes Cabeçadas [pt]	Admiral; José Manuel Garcia Mendes Cabeçadas (born 1943)	4 November 2002	5 December 2006	4 years, 31 days	Portuguese Navy	–
17	Luís Valença Pinto [pt]	General; Luís Valença Pinto (born 1946)	5 December 2006	4 February 2011	4 years, 61 days	Portuguese Army	–
18	Luís Evangelista Esteves Araújo	General; Luís Evangelista Esteves Araújo (1949–2023)	7 February 2011	7 February 2014	3 years, 0 days	Portuguese Air Force	–
19	Artur Neves Pina Monteiro [pt]	General; Artur Neves Pina Monteiro (born 1952)	7 February 2014	1 March 2018	4 years, 22 days	Portuguese Army	–
20	António da Silva Ribeiro	Admiral; António da Silva Ribeiro (born 1957)	1 March 2018	1 March 2023	5 years, 0 days	Portuguese Navy	–
21	José Nunes da Fonseca	General; José Nunes da Fonseca (born 1961)	1 March 2023	1 March 2026	2 years, 364 days	Portuguese Army	–
22	João Cartaxo Alves	General; João Cartaxo Alves (born 1962)	March 2, 2026	Incumbent	144 days	Portuguese Air Force	–

== See also ==
- Portuguese Army
- Portuguese Air Force
- Portuguese Navy
- National Republican Guard (Portugal)
