= Saint-Malo declaration =

1998 agreement between France and the United Kingdom

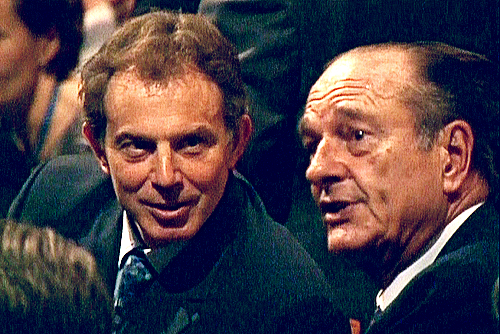
Tony Blair and Jacques Chirac

The Saint-Malo declaration was a document signed in December 1998 by British prime minister Tony Blair and French President Jacques Chirac, who met to advance the creation of a European security and defense policy, including a European military force capable of autonomous action. The summit where the document was signed took place at the French coastal resort of Saint-Malo.

The Saint-Malo declaration was a response to the armed conflict in Kosovo in the late 1990s, in which the international community, and especially the European Union and its member states, were perceived to have failed to intervene to stop the conflict. A year later, as a direct consequence of the Saint-Malo summit, a "Headline Goal" was formulated in Helsinki, setting 2003 as a target date for the creation of a European force of up to 60,000 troops.

== See also ==
- Common Security and Defence Policy
- Western European Union
- NATO
