= List of non-United Nations peacekeeping missions =

Below is a list of current, historical and proposed peacekeeping missions which were not managed directly by the United Nations, though some are mandated by, and report to, the United Nations Security Council.

== African Union operations ==
=== Ongoing ===
Years	Operation	Location	Conflict
2025	African Union Support and Stabilization Mission in Somalia (AUSSOM)	Somalia	Somali Civil War

=== Completed ===
Years	Operation	Location	Conflict
2003-2004	African Union Mission in Burundi (AMIB)	Burundi	Burundi Civil War
2004-2007	African Union Mission in Sudan (AMIS)	Sudan	Darfur Conflict
2007-2022	African Union Mission to Somalia (AMISOM)	Somalia	War in Somalia
2008	Operation Democracy in Comoros	Comoros	2008 invasion of Anjouan
2011-2014	African-led International Support Mission to the Central African Republic (MISCA)	Central African Republic	Central African Republic Conflict
2011-2018	Regional Task Force	Uganda	Lord's Resistance Army insurgency
2022-2024	African Union Transition Mission in Somalia (ATMIS)	Somalia	Somali Civil War

== Board of Peace operations ==
Years	Operation	Location	Conflict
2025	International Stabilization Force	Gaza Strip	Gaza war

== Commonwealth of Nations operations ==
Years	Operation	Location	Conflict
1979-1980	Commonwealth Monitoring Force in Rhodesia (CMFR)	Rhodesia → Zimbabwe Rhodesia → Southern Rhodesia → Zimbabwe	1980 general election monitoring

== East African Community operations ==
Years	Operation	Location	Conflict
2022-2023	East African Community Regional Force in the Democratic Republic of Congo (EACRF)	Democratic Republic of the Congo	Kivu Conflict

== Economic Community of West African States (ECOWAS) operations ==
=== Ongoing ===
Year	Operation	Location	Conflict
2022	Stabilization Support Mission in Guinea-Bissau (SSMGB)	Guinea-Bissau	Guinea-Bissau clashes

=== Completed ===
Years	Operation	Location	Conflict
1990–1995 and 2003.	Economic Community of West African States mission in Liberia (ECOMIL)	Liberia	First and Second Liberian Civil War
1997–2000	Organization of African Unity endorsed West African Peacekeeping operation	Sierra Leone	Sierra Leone Civil War

== European Union operations ==
=== Ongoing ===
Year	Operation	Location	Conflict
2004	European Union Force Bosnia and Herzegovina (EUFOR ALTHEA)	Bosnia and Herzegovina	Monitoring the military implementation of the Dayton Agreement
2005	European Union Border Assistance Mission to Rafah (EUBAM Rafah)	Gaza Strip	Gaza-Israeli border monitoring
2006	European Union Mission for the Support of Palestinian Police and Rule of Law (EUPOL COPPS)	Palestinian Authority	Palestinian Authority police training
2008	European Union Monitoring Mission in Georgia (EUMM Georgia)	Georgia	Georgian War
2008	European Union Naval Force Operation Somalia (EU NAVFOR ATALANTA)	Horn of Africa	Piracy in the Horn of Africa
2008	European Union Rule of Law Mission in Kosovo (EULEX Kosovo)	Kosovo	Support to the Kosovo authorities
2010	European Union Training Mission in Somalia (EUTM Somalia)	Somalia	Support to the Somali Armed Forces
2012	European Union Capacity Building Mission in Somalia (EUCAP Somalia)	Somalia	Support to the stability of Somalia
2013	European Union Integrated Border Assistance Mission in Libya (EUBAM Libya)	Libya	Libyan war
2014	European Union Capacity Building Mission in Mali (EUCAP Sahel Mali)	Mali	Support to Malian internal security forces
2014	European Union Advisory Mission in Ukraine (EUAM Ukraine)	Ukraine	Reform of the Ukrainian authorities' civilian security sector
2016	European Union Training Mission in the Central African Republic (EUTM RCA)	Central African Republic	Support to civilian governance
2017	European Union Advisory Mission in Iraq (EUAM Iraq)	Iraq	Reform of the Iraqi national security sector
2019	European Union Regional Advisory Cell for the Sahel (EU RACC SAHEL )	Sahel	Support to the Sahel region
2019	European Union Advisory Mission in the Central African Republic (EUAM RCA)	Central African Republic	support to the civilian government
2020	European Union Naval Force Mediterranean (EUNAVFOR MED IRINI)	Libya	Second Libyan Civil War
2022	European Union Military Assistance Mission in Support of Ukraine (EUMAM Ukraine)	Ukraine	Russian invasion of Ukraine in 2022
2023	European Union Mission in Armenia (EUM Armenia)	Armenia	Armenian-Azerbaijani border crisis
2023	European Union Security and Defence Initiative in Support of West African Countries of the Gulf of Guinea (EU SDI GOG)	Gulf of Guinea	Support to the security and defence forces of Ivory Coast, Ghana, Togo and Benin
2023	European Union Partnership Mission in the Republic of Moldova (EUPM Moldova)	Moldova	Support to the Moldovan government
2024	European Union Naval Force Operation (EUNAVFOR ASPIDES)	Red Sea	Red Sea Crisis
2024	European Union Military Assistance Mission Mozambique (EUMAM Mozambique)	Mozambique	Support to the Mozambican Armed Forces

=== Completed ===
Year	Operation	Location	Conflict
1991-2007	European Union Monitoring Mission in the former Yugoslavia (ECMM / EUMM)	former Yugoslavia	Brioni Agreement monitoring
2002	Police Assistance Mission of the European Community to Albania (PAMECA)	Albania	support to local police
2003-2012	European Union Police Mission in Bosnia and Herzegovina (EUPM BiH)	Bosnia and Herzegovina	support to local police
2003	European Union Military Operation in the Republic of Macedonia (EUFOR Concordia)	Republic of Macedonia	Monitoring of the Ohrid Agreement
2003	European Union Military Operation in the Democratic Republic of the Congo (EUFOR Artemis)	Democratic Republic of the Congo	Ituri conflict
2003-2005	European Union Police Mission in the former Yugoslav Republic of Macedonia (EUPOL FYROM)	Republic of Macedonia	support to local police
2004-2005	European Union Rule of Law Mission in Georgia (EUJUST Georgia)	Georgia	support to the rule of law
2005-2007	European Union Police Mission in Kinshasa (EUPOL Kinshasa)	Democratic Republic of the Congo	support to local police
2005-2016	European Union Security Sector Reform Mission in the Democratic Republic of the Congo (EUSEC RD Congo)	Democratic Republic of the Congo	support to the security sector
2005-2013	European Union Integrated Rule of Law Mission in Iraq (EUJUST LEX Iraq)	Iraq	supporting the rule of law
2005-2007	European Union Support to African Union Mission in Sudan (AMIS EU Supporting Action)	Sudan	
2005-2006	European Union Monitoring Mission in Aceh (AMM)	Aceh, Indonesia	Monitoring the Helsinki Agreement
2005-2006	European Union Police Advisory Team in the former Yugoslav Republic of Macedonia (EUPAT)	Republic of Macedonia	supporting local police
2006	European Union Military Operation in the Democratic Republic of the Congo (EUFOR RD Congo)	Democratic Republic of the Congo	monitoring the 2006 Democratic Republic of the Congo general election
2007-2016	European Union Police Mission in Afghanistan (EUPOL Afghanistan)	Afghanistan	supporting local police
2007-2014	European Union Police Mission in the Democratic Republic of the Congo (EUPOL RD Congo)	Democratic Republic of the Congo	support to local police
2008-2010	European Union Mission in Support of Security Sector Reform in Guinea-Bissau (EUSSR Guinea-Bissau)	Guinea-Bissau	support to the security sector
2008-2009	European Union Military Operation in Chad and the Central African Republic (EUFOR Tchad/RCA)	Chad and Central African Republic	Central African Republic Civil War
2012-2024	European Union Capacity Building Mission in Niger (EUCAP Sahel Niger)	Niger	support to reconstruction
2013-2014	European Union Aviation Security Mission in South Sudan (EUAVSEC South Sudan)	South Sudan	support to the aviation sector
2013-2024	European Union Training Mission in Mali (EUTM Mali)	Mali	support to administrative training
2014-2015	European Union Military Operation in the Central African Republic (EUFOR RCA)	Central African Republic	Central African Republic Civil War
2015-2016	European Union Military Advisory Mission in the Central African Republic (EUMAM RCA)	Central African Republic	support to military cooperation
2015-2020	European Union Naval Force Mediterranean (EUNAVFOR Med)	Mediterranean	European refugee crisis
2023-2024	European Union Military Partnership Mission in Niger (EUMPM Niger)	Niger	supporting military cooperation

== North Atlantic Treaty Organization (NATO) operations ==
=== Ongoing ===
Year	Operation	Location	Conflict
1999	Kosovo Force	UN-administered Kosovo → Republic of Kosovo	Kosovo War
2025	Operation Baltic Sentry	Baltic Sea: Lithuania, Latvia, Estonia,	Russo-Ukrainian war
2025	Operation Eastern Sentry	Bulgaria, Czech Republic, Estonia, Hungary, Latvia, Lithuania, Poland, Romania and Slovakia	Russo-Ukrainian war

=== Completed ===
Years	Operation	Location	Conflict
1992	Operation Maritime Monitor	International waters off the former Yugoslavia	Yugoslav Wars
1992-1993	Operation Sky Monitor	Bosnian airspace	Yugoslav Wars
1992-1993	Operation Maritime Guard	International waters in the Adriatic Sea	Yugoslav Wars
1993-1995	Operation Deny Flight	Bosnian airspace	Yugoslav Wars
1993-1996	Operation Sharp Guard	Federal Republic of Yugoslavia	Yugoslav Wars
1995	Operation Deliberate Force	Bosnia and Herzegovina	Yugoslav Wars
1995-1996	Operation Joint Endeavour	Bosnia and Herzegovina	Yugoslav Wars
1996-1998	Operation Joint Guard	Bosnia and Herzegovina	Yugoslav Wars
1998-2004	Operation Joint Forge	Bosnia and Herzegovina	Yugoslav Wars
1999	Operation Allied Force	Federal Republic of Yugoslavia	Kosovo war
2001	Operation Essential Harvest	North Macedonia	Kosovo war
2009-2016	Operation Ocean Shield	Red Sea, Gulf of Aden and Indian Ocean	Piracy off the horn of Africa
2011	Operation Unified Protector	Libya	Libyan Civil War
2012	Operation Active Fence	Turkey	Syrian Civil War
2001-2002	Operation Eagle Assist	U.S. Airspace	War on Terror
2001-2016	Operation Active Endeavour	Mediterranean	War on Terror
2001-2014	International Security Assistance Force	Afghanistan	War on Terror
2003	Operation Display Deterrence	Turkey	War on Terror
2015-2021	Resolute Support Mission	Afghanistan	War on Terror

== Organization for Security and Cooperation in Europe (OSCE) operations ==
Years	Operation	Location	Conflict
1998-1999	Kosovo Verification Mission (KVM)	Kosovo, FR Yugoslavia	Kosovo War
2014-2022	OSCE Special Monitoring Mission to Ukraine	Ukraine	Eastern Ukraine War

== Southern African Development Community (SADC) operations ==
=== Ongoing ===
Year	Operation	Location	Conflict
2021	Southern African Development Community Mission in Mozambique (SAMIM)	Mozambique	Insurgency in Cabo Delgado

=== Completed ===
Years	Operation	Location	Conflict
2023-2025.	Southern African Development Community Mission in the Democratic Republic of Congo (SAMIDRC)	Democratic Republic of the Congo	Democratic Republic of the Congo–Rwanda conflict

== Other operations ==
=== Ongoing ===
From	Operation	Location	Conflict
1982	Multinational Force and Observers	Sinai peninsula	Monitoring the Camp David Accords
1992	Joint Control Commission	Transnistria	Transnistrian War
2025	Gang Suppression Force	Haiti	Haitian conflict
2025	International Gaza Support Center	Gaza Strip	Gaza war

=== Completed ===
Years	Operation	Location	Conflict
1982-1984	Multinational Force in Lebanon (MNF)	Lebanon	Lebanese Civil War
1983-1985	Caribbean Peace Force (ECPF)	Grenada	United States invasion of Grenada
1992-2008	Joint Control Commission for Georgian–Ossetian Conflict Resolution (JCC)	South Ossetia	South Ossetian War and Russo-Georgian War
1987-1990	Indian Peace Keeping Force (IPKF)	Sri Lanka	Sri Lankan Civil War
1994-2019	Temporary International Presence in Hebron (TIPH)	Hebron, West Bank	Cave of the Patriarchs massacre
1994	South Pacific Peacekeeping Force (SPPKF)	Bougainville	Bougainville Civil War
1999-2000	International Force East Timor (INTERFET)	Indonesian occupied East Timor → UN-administered East Timor	East Timorese crisis
2003-2017	Regional Assistance Mission to Solomon Islands (RAMSI)	Solomon Islands	Solomon Islands Civil War
2006-2013	International Stabilization Force	East Timor	East Timorese Crisis
2018 -2019	Idlib demilitarization	Idlib Province, Syria	Russian intervention in the Syrian civil war
2019	Northern Syria Buffer Zone	Northern Syria	Turkish invasion of Northern Syria
2019-2024	Second Northern Syria Buffer Zone	Northern Syria	Turkish invasion of Northern Syria
2020	Peacekeeping operations in Nagorno-Karabakh	Nagorno-Karabakh	Second Nagorno-Karabakh War

== See also ==
- List of United Nations peacekeeping missions
