= List of military and civilian missions of the European Union =

Since 2002, the European Union has intervened abroad thirty times in three different continents.

The European Union (EU) has undertaken a number of overseas missions and operations, drawing on civilian and military capabilities, in several countries across three continents (Europe, Africa and Asia), as part of its Common Security and Defence Policy (CSDP). The operation or mission in question will work in agreement and coordination with the EU delegations, until 2009 known as the European Security and Defence Policy (ESDP).

== Classification ==
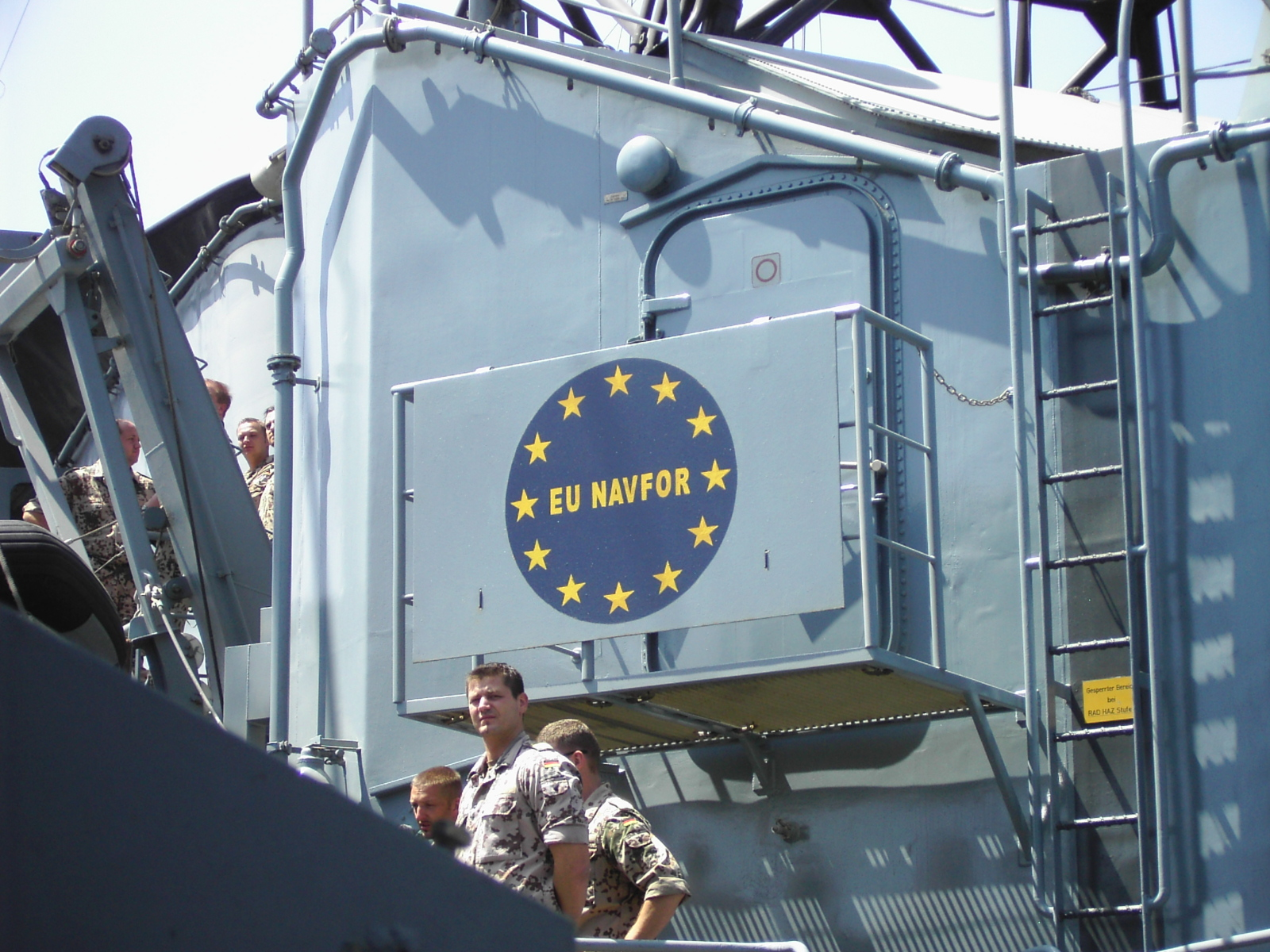
An EUNAVFOR badge displayed aboard a German frigate as part of the mission titled European Union Naval Force (EUNAVFOR) Somalia, commonly referred to as Operation Atalanta.

In the EU terminology, civilian CSDP interventions are called 'missions', regardless of whether they have an executive mandate such as EULEX Kosovo or a non-executive mandate (all others). Civilian missions include uniformed personnel such as Police and Gendarmerie, but not military personnel.

Military interventions, however, can either have an executive mandate such as for example Operation Atalanta in which case they are referred to as 'operations' and are commanded at two-star level; or non-executive mandate (e.g. EUTM Somalia) in which case they are called 'missions' and are commanded at one-star level.

== Deployment procedure ==
The decision to deploy – together with any subsequent management of – the mission or operation in question, will ultimately be taken by the EU member states in the Foreign Affairs Council (FAC).

Military operations may be launched after four planning phases, through which the Operation Commander (Op. Cdr.), Military Staff (EUMS), Military Committee (EUMC), Political and Security Committee (PSC) and Council have different roles.

== Command and control structure ==
The EU command and control (C2) structure is directed by political bodies composed of member states' representatives, and generally requires unanimous decisions. As of April 2019:

Liaison: Advice and recommendations Support and monitoring Preparatory work

Political strategic level:^{[5]}
ISS	EUCO Pres. (EUCO)	Chain of command
Coordination/support
SatCen	CIVCOM	HR/VP (FAC)
INTCEN	HR/VP (PMG)	HR/VP (PSC)^{[6]}	CEUMC (EUMC)
CMPD	DGEUMS^{[3]} (EUMS)
Military/civilian strategic level:
Dir MPCC^{[3]} (MPCC)	JSCC	Civ OpCdr CPCC^{[1]}
Operational level:
MFCdr^{[4]} (MFHQ)	HoM^{[1]}
Tactical level:
CC^{[2]}Air; CC^{[2]} Land; CC^{[2]} Mar; Other CCs^{[2]} European Armed Forces

^{1} In the event of a CSDP Civilian Mission also being in the field, the relations with the Civilian Planning and Conduct Capability (CPCC) and its Civilian Operation Commander (Civ OpCdr), as well as the subordinate Head of Mission (HoM), are coordinated as shown.

^{2} Other Component Commanders (CCs) and service branches which may be established.

^{3} The MPCC is part of the EUMS and Dir MPCC is double-hatted as DGEUMS. Unless the MPCC is used as Operation Headquarters (OHQ), either a national OHQ offered by member states or the NATO Command Structure (NCS) would serve this purpose. In the latter instance, Deputy Supreme Allied Commander Europe (DSACEUR), rather than Dir MPCC, would serve as Operation Commander (OpCdr).

^{4} Unless the MPCC is used as Operation Headquarters (OHQ), the MFCdr would be known as a Force Commander (FCdr), and direct a Force Headquarters (FHQ) rather than a MFHQ. Whereas the MFHQ would act both on the operational and tactical level, the FHQ would act purely on the operational level.

^{5} The political strategic level is not part of the C2 structure per se, but represents the political bodies, with associated support facilities, that determine the missions' general direction. The Council determines the role of the High Representative (HR/VP), who serves as Vice-President of the European Commission, attends European Council meetings, chairs the Foreign Affairs Council (FAC) and may chair the Political and Security Committee (PSC) in times of crisis. The HR/VP proposes and implements CSDP decisions.

^{6} Same composition as Committee of Permanent Representatives (COREPER) II, which also prepares for the CSDP-related work of the FAC.

== List of ongoing missions ==
Beginning	Name	Abbreviation
2 December 2004	European Union Force Bosnia and Herzegovina ALTHEA	EUFOR ALTHEA
25 November 2005	European Union Border Assistance Mission to Rafah	EUBAM Rafah
1 January 2006	European Union Mission for the Support of Palestinian Police and Rule of Law	EUPOL COPPS
1 October 2008	European Union Monitoring Mission in Georgia	EUMM Georgia
5 November 2008	European Union Naval Force Operation Somalia ATALANTA	EU NAVFOR ATALANTA
9 December 2008	European Union Rule of Law Mission in Kosovo	EULEX Kosovo
10 April 2010	European Union Training Mission in Somalia	EUTM Somalia
16 July 2012	European Union Capacity Building Mission in Somalia	EUCAP Somalia
May 2013	European Union Integrated Border Assistance Mission in Libya	EUBAM Libya
April 2014	European Union Capacity Building Mission in Mali	EUCAP Sahel Mali
December 2014	European Union Advisory Mission in Ukraine	EUAM Ukraine
16 July 2016	European Union Training Mission in the Central African Republic	EUTM RCA
22 November 2017	European Union Advisory Mission in Iraq	EUAM Iraq
9 December 2019	European Union Advisory Mission in the Central African Republic	EUAM RCA
31 March 2020	European Union Naval Force Mediterranean IRINI	EUNAVFOR MED IRINI
17 October 2022	European Union Military Assistance Mission in Support of Ukraine	EUMAM Ukraine
23 January 2023	European Union Mission in Armenia	EUM Armenia
December 2023	European Union Security and Defence Initiative in Support of West African Countries of the Gulf of Guinea	EU SDI GOG
24 April 2023	European Union Partnership Mission in the Republic of Moldova	EUPM Moldova
19 February 2024	European Union Naval Force Operation ASPIDES	EUNAVFOR ASPIDES
1 September 2024	European Union Military Assistance Mission Mozambique	EUMAM Mozambique
21 April 2026	European Union Partnership Mission in Armenia	EUPM Armenia
TBD	European Union Support Mission in Lebanon	EUSM Lebanon

== List of past missions ==
Beginning	End	Name	Abbreviation	Alternative name	Personnel	OHQ
July 1991	31 December 2007	European Union Monitoring Mission in the former Yugoslavia	ECMM / EUMM	N/A	?	?
December 2002	—	Police Assistance Mission of the European Community to Albania	PAMECA	N/A	?	?
1 January 2003	30 June 2012	European Union Police Mission in Bosnia and Herzegovina	EUPM BiH	N/A	774	?
31 March 2003	15 December 2003	European Union Military Operation in the Republic of Macedonia	EUFOR Concordia	Operation Concordia	400	ACO
12 June 2003	1 September 2003	European Union Military Operation in the Democratic Republic of the Congo	EUFOR Artemis	Operation Artemis	1800	Paris
15 December 2003	14 December 2005	European Union Police Mission in the former Yugoslav Republic of Macedonia (Note: This operation was launched on 15 December 2003 and covered an initial period of one year.)	EUPOL FYROM	EUPOL Proxima	200	?
16 July 2004	14 July 2005	European Union Rule of Law Mission in Georgia (Note: This mission was launched on 16 July 2004 for a duration of 12 months, and was designed to support the Georgian authorities in challenges to the criminal justice system and reform process.)	EUJUST Georgia	EUJUST Themis	27	?
2005	30 November 2025	European Union Border Assistance Mission to Moldova and Ukraine	EUBAM Moldova and Ukraine	N/A	?	?
12 April 2005	30 June 2007	European Union Police Mission in Kinshasa (Note: In October 2003, the Democratic Republic of Congo requested the EU for assistance in setting up an Integrated Police Unit. EUPOL Kinshasa monitored, mentored and advised the IPU once trained and operational under a Congolese chain of command, until the national elections in DRC held in 2005. The mission finished on 30 June 2007.)	EUPOL Kinshasa	N/A	?	?
8 June 2005	2016	European Union Security Sector Reform Mission in the Democratic Republic of the Congo (Note: The European Union mission is to provide advice and assistance for security sector reform in the Democratic Republic of the Congo. Among EUSEC DR Congo's projects was the 'Modernisation de l’Administration des Forces Armées de la RDC' (Modernisation of the Administration of the FARDC) underway in December 2008, under which, amongst other projects, information technology training was being delivered. It appears that in December 2009, Secretary-General/High Representative Javier Solana issued a formal invitation for the United States government to offer a contribution to EUSEC RD Congo. EUSEC DR Congo was initially planned in 2005-06 to include eight EU advisors assigned to posts in the DRC's integrated military structure (Structure Militaire d'Integration (?)), the army general staff, the National Committee for Disarmament, Demobilization, and Reintegration (CONADER?), the Joint Operational Committee, and the Ministry of Defence. From 2007 to 2011 EUSEC personnel grew from 8 to 46, with about 30 locally employed staff. 34 locally employed staff were listed in 2011. In 2008 with 46 staff 26 were in Kinshasa and 20 in the eastern DRC. Two personnel have died due to illness.)	EUSEC RD Congo	N/A	?	?
1 July 2005	31 December 2013	European Union Integrated Rule of Law Mission in Iraq	EUJUST LEX Iraq	N/A	?	?
18 July 2005	31 December 2007	European Union Support to African Union Mission in Sudan (Note: European Union support for the African Union Mission in Sudan (AMIS), the mission of the African Union in Darfur. NATO likewise provided support to AMIS from 2005 to 2007 Both EU and NATO missions ended with the handover to UNAMID on 31 December 2007. It included provision of airlift for 2,000 personnel, financial aid totalling more than EUR 500 million, the deployment of 15 military experts, 30 police officers, two military observers with AMIS, plus several military advisors sent to Addis Ababa to support the EU Special Representative.)	AMIS EU Supporting Action	N/A	?	?
15 September 2005	15 December 2006	European Union Monitoring Mission in Aceh	AMM	N/A	?	?
15 December 2005	14 June 2006	European Union Police Advisory Team in the former Yugoslav Republic of Macedonia (Note: Launched on 15 December 2005 as a follow-on mission to EUPOL Proxima. The EU monitors and mentors the country's police on priority issues in the field of border police, public peace and order and accountability, the fight against corruption and organised crime. It finished its mandate in May 2006.)	EUPAT	N/A	?	?
12 June 2006	30 November 2006	European Union Military Operation in the Democratic Republic of the Congo (2006)	EUFOR RD Congo	N/A	2300	?
15 June 2007	31 December 2016	European Union Police Mission in Afghanistan	EUPOL Afghanistan	N/A	?	?
1 July 2007	30 September 2014	European Union Police Mission in the Democratic Republic of the Congo (Note: Established as a successor to EUPOL Kinshasa with an initial mandate until 30 June 2008.)	EUPOL RD Congo	N/A	?	?
12 February 2008	30 September 2010	European Union Mission in Support of Security Sector Reform in Guinea-Bissau (Note: A mission for security sector reform in Guinea-Bissau with an initial mandate until 31 May 2009. Ended due to concerns over cooperation by Guinea-Bissau.)	EUSSR Guinea-Bissau	N/A	?	?
17 March 2008	15 March 2009	European Union Military Operation in Chad and the Central African Republic	EUFOR Tchad/RCA	N/A	3700	?
July 2012	30 June 2024	European Union Capacity Building Mission in Niger	EUCAP Sahel Niger	N/A	?	CPCC
February 2013	January 2014	European Union Aviation Security Mission in South Sudan (Note: Strengthening aviation security at Juba's airport.)	EUAVSEC South Sudan	N/A	?	?
18 February 2013	17 May 2024	European Union Training Mission in Mali	EUTM Mali	N/A	500	MPCC
10 February 2014	23 March 2015	European Union Military Operation in the Central African Republic	EUFOR RCA	N/A	600	?
23 March 2015	16 July 2016	European Union Military Advisory Mission in the Central African Republic	EUMAM RCA	N/A	?	?
22 June 2015	31 March 2020	European Union Naval Force Mediterranean	EUNAVFOR Med	Operation Sophia	?	ITA-JFHQ
1 June 2019	30 January 2026	European Union Regional Advisory and Coordination Cell for the Sahel	EU RACC SAHEL	N/A	?	?
20 February 2023	30 June 2024	European Union Military Partnership Mission in Niger	EUMPM Niger	N/A	?	?

== See also ==
Related topics of the Common Security and Defence Policy:

- Operations of the European Border and Coast Guard
- Defence forces of the European Union
- History of the Common Security and Defence Policy

Operations and exercises of the precursors of the Common Security and Defence Policy

- Missions of the Western European Union
- Exercises of the Western Union

Operations and exercises of the multinational forces made available to the CSDP in accordance with article 42.3 of the Treaty on European Union:

- List of operations of the European Maritime Force
- List of operations of the European Rapid Operational Force
- List of missions of the European Gendarmerie Force
- List of exercises of the European Maritime Force
- List of operations of the European Corps

Missions and exercises of other organisations:

- List of missions of the United Nations
- List of operations of the North Atlantic Treaty Organisation
- List of exercises of the North Atlantic Treaty Organisation
- List of non-UN peacekeeping missions
