= Takuba Task Force =

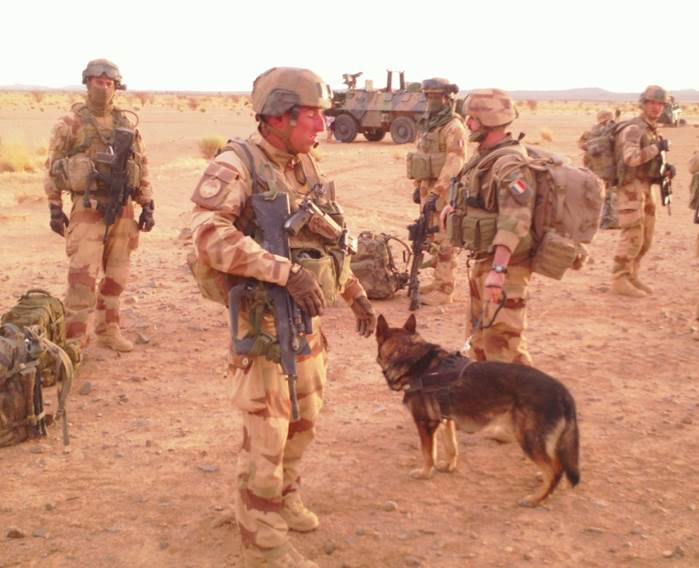
- French troops during combat operations in Gao
- Active: 27 March 2020 – 30 June 2022
- Country: European Union (>600 troops) Belgium (3 liaison officers); Czech (60 troops); Denmark (70 troops and 2 helicopters); Estonia (95 troops); France (~300 troops); Greece (Unconfirmed); Hungary (up to 80 troops); Italy (1 medical support unit, 200 to 250 troops and 8 helicopters); Lithuania (20-30 Troops and 1 C-27J Spartan); Netherlands (several liaison officers); Portugal (2 staff officers and 20 troops) Romania (50 troops in T4 2021); Sweden (150 troops and 3 helicopters)
- Branch: Defence forces of the European Union
- Type: Special Forces
- Size: 600 troops (May 2021)
- Part of: Special Operations Command (France)
- Garrison/HQ: Gao and Menaka (Mali)
- Engagements: Mali War

Commanders
- Current commander: Colonel Peder (SWE)
- Notable commanders: Général de brigade aérienne Philippe Landicheff

The Takuba Task Force was a European military task force placed under French command, established to advise, assist and accompany Malian Armed Forces, in coordination with G5-Sahel partners and other international actors on the ground.

TTF operated from Malian Armed Forces (FAMa) bases located in Gao, Ansogo, Menaka and N’Djamena in Chad. On 30 June 2022, the task force ended its mission in Mali during the withdrawal of French forces involved in Operation Barkhane.

By January 2022, of the 900 men in the task force, nearly half were French. Besides France, only Denmark, Estonia, Sweden and the Czech Republic sent special forces, the other countries involved sent only soldiers assigned to logistical tasks.

== The genesis of a European taskforce ==
On 27 March 2020, the governments of Belgium, Czech Republic, Denmark, Estonia, France, Germany, Mali, Niger, the Netherlands, Norway, Portugal, Sweden and the United Kingdom issued a political statement expressing support for the creation of a task force, integrated to the command of French operation Barkhane, aiming at tackling the terrorist groups in the Liptako region, a historic region falling in eastern Burkina Faso, southwestern Niger and a small portion of southeast central Mali. Under the name Takuba, the task force had to advise, assist and accompany Malian Armed Forces, in coordination with G5-Sahel partners and other international actors on the ground, including the UN mission MINUSMA, as well as the EU missions EUTM Mali, EUCAP Sahel Mali and EUCAP Sahel Niger.

=== Origin of the name ===
The name of the Task Force is originated from the takuba sword that is used across the western Sahel, the task force was established at the request of the Nigerien and Malian governments against the background of a deteriorating security situation in the Sahel region.

=== Operational history ===
Takuba is working closely with Barkhane and the local forces of the G5-Sahel. On the 15th of July 2020, the Task Force declared its IOC, subsequently followed by its FOC the 2nd of April 2021.

The TF took part in the "Opération Solstice", jointly with French and Nigerien forces, against the Islamic State in the Greater Sahara (ISGS). The European forces operated without the malian ULRI they usually fight with. This was made in order to reinforce the cooperation with Niger. The operation was successful, taking 13 motorcycles, more than 30 light infantry weapons, 50 communication devices and material used in the confection of improvised explosives devices (IED). 6 jihadists were killed and 2 others captured, which were close to the emir of the ISGS.

The Swedish QRF was reportedly engaged multiple times, not only in reaction but was also involved in pre-planified operations.

Early in September, the ULRI 3, accompanied by the TG1, conducted a harassment operation against an armed terrorist group. The Malian maneuver was described as “tactically remarkable” by the French.

Mid-September, the French, Czech, and Swedish Task Group conducted an operation alongside the Malian forces in the Menaka region in order to characterize the terrorists networks responsible for IED attacks and to disturb the terrorist groups inside their own AO.

=== Organisation ===
PC - Menaka-Based European Command Center led by France with Belgian, Czech, Estonian, Italian, Dutch, Portuguese, and Swedish officers.

PF - French Protection Force of the Menaka Camp.

SOST - Special Operations Surgeon Team, based in Menaka.

TG1 - Franco-Estonian unit. Based in Gao.

TG2 - Franco-Czech unit. Based in Menaka.

TG3 - Swedish QRF. Based in Menaka.

TG4

TG5

== Contributions to the Task Force ==
=== First intentions ===
Deployed in summer 2020, the task force is mainly composed of European special operation forces with a high level of autonomy. So far, contributions have been pledged by Belgium, Czechia, Denmark, Estonia, France, Greece, the Netherlands, Portugal, Romania and Sweden.

From that list, only France, the "nation-cadre" of the Task Force is permanently deployed.

=== The core of the Task Force: French, Estonian and Czech participations ===
The Task Force is primarily formed by two task groups : the TG1, a Franco-Estonian unit, and the Franco-Czech TG2. These groups are supported by the Swedish Rapid-Response Force, named TG3. Each of the task groups support an ULRI (Unité Légère de Reconnaissance et d'Intervention), a type of light unit from the Malian forces operating with rifles such as the AK-47 and the AK-74M. These units use motorbikes and toyotas as their primary vehicles.

The Europeans TG trained and fought with the Malian units. In addition to that, 2 other groups, TG4 and TG5, are still in formation in July 2021.

The Czechs are expected to prolong their commitment to Takuba following an announcement made the 30th of September 2021 by the French minister of Armed Forces.

=== Swedish Rapid Response Force: The Scandinavian participation ===
In addition to the French and Estonian units (at first 50 troops, but now 95 men) already operating in the region, a Swedish contingent consisting of 150 men and 3 UH-60M helicopters is deployed since the first quarter of 2021. The Swedish troop contribution to Task Force Takuba is a helicopter-borne rapid-response force, largely manned by operators from the SOG, ready to be deployed if something unforeseen occurs. The task force is also used for other operations, as for example to support other countries that exercise and conduct operations with the Malian army.

The Swedish 150-strong unit can be increased by another 100 troops if necessary. The task force comprises special forces’ operators, personnel from the special forces support units as well as personnel from conventional units. A small group of Norwegian soldiers are confirmed to join the Swedish unit in fall 2021. Norway wanted to join Takuba from the start but faced initially a setback from its parliament. The nation is already active in the Sahel region with an air detachment consisting of a C-130J. In February 2022 the Norwegian Minister of Defense stated that the country will not contribute soldiers to the Takuba force.

Denmark is sending 2 EH-101 Merlin helicopters, up to 70 troops and one or two staff-officers.

=== European Balkans participation: Greece and Romania ===
On November 20, 2020, during an informal meeting of the defense ministers of the European Union (EU), Greek Minister of Defense Nikolaos Panagiotopoulos read a report on the situation in the Sahel and specifically Mali. He emphasized the common interest of European nations for stability in the Sahel. The Greek Foreign Minister stressed the common interest of the member states in achieving stability in the Sahel and enhancing security in the wider region, supporting the gradual resumption of Joint Security and Defense activities in Mali as an integral part of the EU regional strategy. Greece is preparing to send a military unit to Mali to join the French military forces and carry out operations against jihadist terrorists, in an operation separate from the EU's mission.

The Greek mission will be small and will involve Special Forces personnel who will be an addition to the TAKUBA Operational Force (TF TAKUBA). Greece is expected to send Special Forces from the Special Paratrooper Unit (E.T.A.).

Recently, Romania and Croatia approved a contribution, starting T4 2021, with 50 troops and equipment.

=== The Italian participation ===
The deployment of Italian forces to Takuba began in March 2021 and will reach the IOC (Initial Operational Capability) before September, according to the Italian minister Lorenzo Guerini. They are based in Gao and Menaka and will perform mainly recon and MEDEVAC tasks. This is essential for Takuba in order to be independent from Barkhane. A total of 8 helicopters are coming with the Italian troops. 4 of which are transport and the others are A129 Mangusta attack helicopters. The engagement limit has been upgraded, from 200 to 250 troops and from 20 to 44 vehicles for the 2021-2022 period. This means that, on average, 150 soldiers will be on the ground.

The estimated expenses for the mission are 49 million euros. Costing, per month, 1,2 million euros for the personnel and 1,4 million euros for operating cost. In addition to that, the investments and deployments expenses are estimated to be 23 million euros.

The Italian government is also planning to expense the mission from 2022.

=== Liaisons officers in Takuba: Belgium and the Netherlands ===
3 Belgian liaison officers (2 in Mali and 1 in Chad) have been integrated since April 19 to the staff of the Takuba Task Force according to Belga agency. The Netherlands also sent liaison officers to the force's staff. Belgium will also send a surgeon officer from September to November 2021.

=== Portuguese Contingent ===
Portugal will send an initial contingent of 2 staff officers and 20 special forces. These special forces belong mostly to the army but also involve navy special forces and are known as the 1º Contigente Nacional Takuba (1st National TAKUBA Contingent). Between the 4th and the 8th of October, this contingent held a preparatory exercise called "GAO211" for their TAKUBA deployment.

In 2022, the Portuguese Government may increase the size of the Portuguese deployment if deemed necessary.

=== Hungary's contingent ===
Hungary will engage up to 80 special forces in Takuba in the first trimester of 2022. But a preparatory deployment of approximately 20 soldiers will take place before the end of 2021.

It will be a two-year commitment to the European mission led by France. There will be rotations every 4 months until December 2023.

=== Lithuania's commitment ===
The Lithuanian defense minister, Arvydas Anusauskas, announced on 20 September 2021 that his country will send 20 to 30 troops and a C-27J Spartan to the Sahel for the Takuba Task Force.
