= EUPM =

EUPM may refer to:

- European Union Partnership Mission in Moldova
- European Union Police Mission
- European Union Police Mission in Bosnia and Herzegovina
