= EUTM =

EUTM may refer to:

- European Union trade mark
- European Union Training Mission, including:
  - EUTM CAR (Central African Republic)
  - EUTM Mali
  - European Union Training Mission Somalia
