= European Union Advisory Mission in the Central African Republic =

- Abbreviation: EUAM RCA
- Formation: December 2019
- Headquarters: Bangui
- Civilian Operations Commander: Stefano Tomat
- Head of Mission: Gail Van Hoever (Belgium)
- Parent organization: European Union
- Website: www.eeas.europa.eu/euam-rca_en

The European Union Advisory Mission in the Central African Republic (EUAM RCA), is a European Union Common Security and Defence Policy (CSDP) civilian mission in the Central African Republic. It strategically advises the internal security forces of the Central African Republic on security sector reform and on increased interoperability with other security actors.

== History and context ==
In 2012/2013, a coalition of rebel groups (Séléka) took over large parts of the Central African Republic, including the capital Bangui, and the government requested a UN peacekeeping force. In 2016, former Prime Minister Faustin-Archange Touadéra was elected as president. As large parts of the country were at the time controlled by armed groups, the election could not be conducted in many areas of the country. In 2019, President Touadéra asked the European Union for the establishment of an advisory mission that should contribute to the reform of the security sector, mainly the national police and the national gendarmerie forces.

The Council of the European Union decided in December 2019 to establish a civil advisory mission (EUAM RCA) and deployed it in August 2020. The establishment of the mission has been described as a sign of diversifying the international actors engaged in the country. In July 2022, President Touadéra visited the mission headquarters.

In 2022, the Council extended the mandate of EUAM RCA until August 2024. It was further extended until August 2026. In December 2024, President Touadéra received the Deputy Civilian Operations Commander, Kirsi Henriksson, and discussed mission activities.

== Mandate ==
In its Decision from 2019, the Council of the European Union defined the strategic objectives as follows:

- Governance support within the Ministry of Interior and Public Security
- Transformation support for the internal security actors (effective functioning)
- Interoperability support for internal security forces and relevant stakeholders

== Activities ==
The mission EUAM RCA complements the activities of the military training mission of the European Union in the Central African Republic (EUTM RCA) which works together with the Central African defense forces.

The mission EUAM RCA works together with the National Police, the National Gendarmerie, the Customs Office, the Ministry of Justice, the prison administration, and the Ministry of Water and Forests. Together with the UN peacekeeping mission MINUSCA, the mission organizes exercises in Central African prisons.

== Previous Heads of Mission ==
Head of Mission (HoM)	Country	Term of office
Paulo Soares	Portugal	2020-2022
José Marques Dias	Portugal	2022-2025
