= European Union Police Mission in the Democratic Republic of the Congo =

The European Union Police Mission in the Democratic Republic of Congo was a deployment of the European Union Common Security and Defence Policy in the Democratic Republic of Congo.

== History ==
As regards police in the Democratic Republic of Congo, the EU first provided assistance in setting up an Integrated Police Unit, under the mission title EUPOL Kinshasa, which began in April 2005. The mission monitored, mentored, and then advised the IPU, once the new unit was trained and operational under Congolese command. The mission finished on 30 June 2007, and was established as a successor mission, with an initial mandate until 30 June 2008. The mission was completed on 30 September 2014.

== Mandate ==
EUPOL RD Congo was tasked to monitor, mentor and advise on the reform and restructuring of the Congolese National Police and to contribute to improving interaction between the police and the criminal justice system in the broader sense. The overall aim was to assist in building a "viable, professional and multiethnic/integrated [Congolese] police force." It was a mentoring/advisory mission without executive powers. It was specifically instructed to coordinate its action with the other international efforts in the field of police reform and the criminal justice system. The mission consisted of around 40 personnel.
