= International Gaza Support Center =

Body established as part of the 2025 Gaza peace plan

- Abbreviation: IGSC
- Formation: 10 October 2025
- Headquarters: Kiryat Gat, Israel
- Commander: Brad Cooper
- Deputy Commanders: Patrick Frank; Unnamed deputy commander
- Civilian lead: Steven Fagin
- Parent organization: CENTCOM
- Staff: ~600

The International Gaza Support Center (IGSC), previously known as the Civil-Military Coordination Center (CMCC), is a body established in October 2025 as part of a peace agreement which aims to coordinate stabilization and relief efforts in the Gaza Strip in the aftermath of the Gaza war.

== Background ==
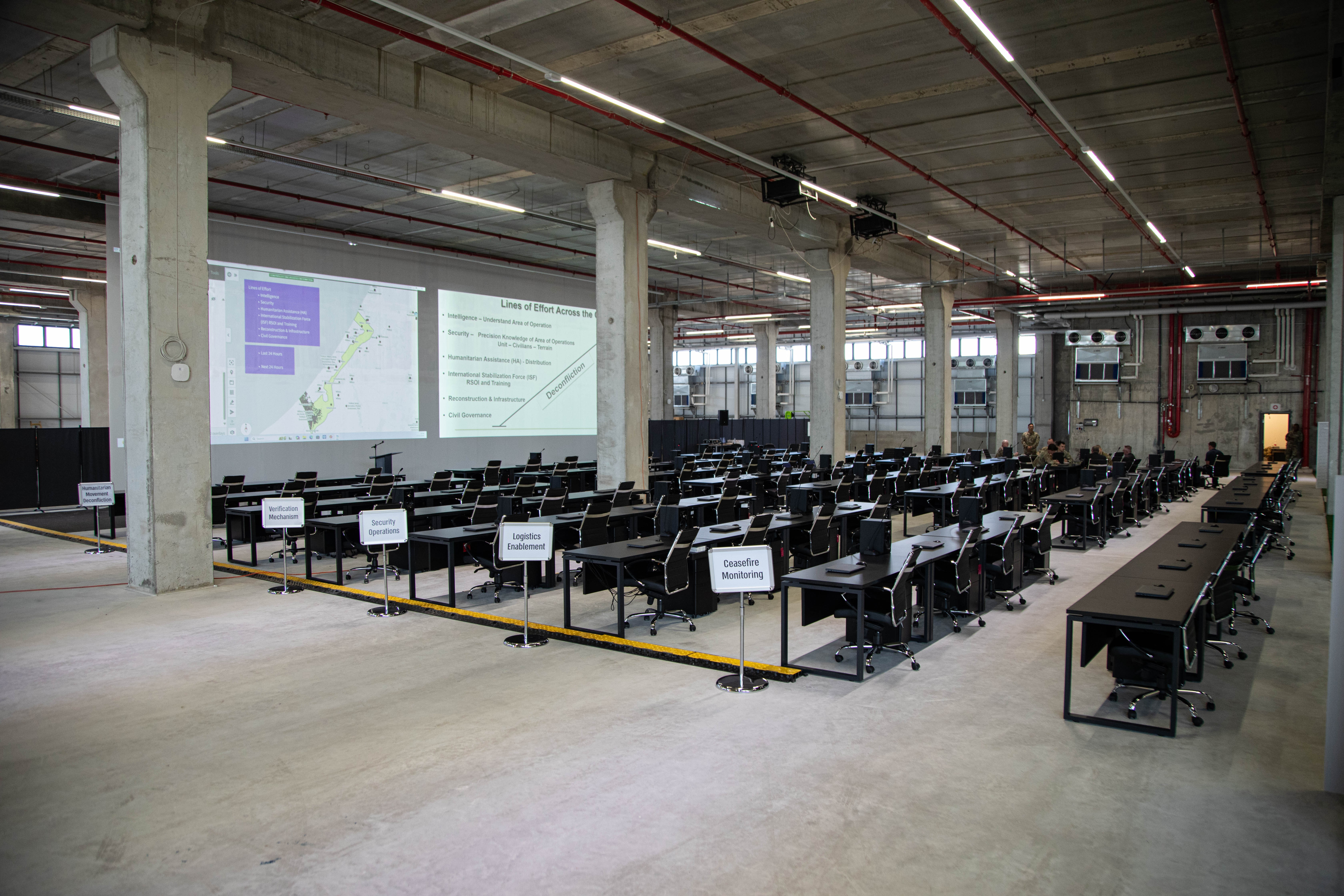
Conference room during establishment of the CMCC, October 2025

The Gaza war began in October 2023 following a series of coordinated armed attacks carried out by Hamas and several other Palestinian militant groups in southern Israel on 7 October 2023. Following earlier attempts at establishing a ceasefire, both Israel and Hamas accepted the first part of a peace plan devised by US president Donald Trump and former British prime minister Tony Blair which came into effect on 10 October 2025. The 20-point peace plan called for the creation of an International Stabilization Force to provide security and oversee demilitarization and reconstruction in Gaza.

== Purpose ==
The CMCC is intended to serve as a main coordination hub for stabilization efforts in Gaza, monitoring the implementation of the ceasefire agreement and facilitating humanitarian aid. The multinational facility features an operations floor that allows staff to assess real-time developments in the Gaza Strip.

On 21 October 2025, Admiral Brad Cooper, described the CMCC as "critical to enabling the transition to civilian governance in Gaza" and said the CMCC would "integrate representatives from partner nations, non-governmental organizations, international institutions, and the private sector as they arrive to the coordination center" over the next two weeks.

By mid-November, the CMCC had established six working groups relating to security, intelligence, humanitarian affairs, engineering & infrastructure, multinational force preparations, and civil administration.

== Deployment ==
Drone footage of suspected Hamas members looting an aid truck in northern Khan Yunis, 31 October 2025

The United States began setting up the Civil-Military Coordination Center immediately after the cessation of hostilities and partial withdrawal of Israeli forces from the Gaza Strip on 10 October 2025. The CMCC was officially opened on 17 October. A parallel counterpart to the CMCC is expected to be set up in El-Arish, Egypt with representatives from Egypt, Qatar, Turkey and the United States.

On 11 October 2025, Brad Cooper along with Steve Witkoff and Jared Kushner travelled into the Gaza Strip to verify Israel's compliance with the first phase of the agreement.

On 21 October, US vice-president JD Vance visited the CMCC headquarters in Kiryat Gat, Israel.

On 24 October, US Secretary of State Marco Rubio visited the headquarters. On the same day, the New York Times reported that the US military had begun operating surveillance drones over the Gaza Strip to monitor ground activity, with Israel's consent.

On 29 October, Israeli prime minister Benjamin Netanyahu officially visited the CMCC for the first time. He was accompanied by senior IDF officials including Major General Yaakov Dolf, who will lead coordination between the IDF and the CMCC. Netanyahu reaffirmed his support for the CMCC's joint mission while reiterating that disarming Hamas remained a priority.

On 30 October, it was reported that representatives from 14 countries and 20 international organisations were present at the centre.

From 30 October-1 November, US Chairman of the Joint Chiefs of Staff, General Dan Caine, visited Israel and met with Israeli Chief of Staff Eyal Zamir and defence minister Israel Katz. According to Katz, "We discussed the challenges in the near and distant arenas, foremost among them the Gaza Strip, and our commitment to the release of all the hostages, the demilitarization of Gaza, and the disarmament of Hamas." General Caine also toured the Gaza Strip via helicopter and met with IDF liaison Yaakov Dolf at the CMCC.

On 31 October, a US MQ-9 drone monitoring the ceasefire observed a humanitarian aid truck being looted in northern Khan Yunis by what the US suspects to be Hamas operatives. CENTCOM released footage of the attack, showing the looters attacking the truck driver and stealing the truck, with the driver's status remaining unknown at the time. Marco Rubio admonished Hamas for undermining the peace plan and urged them to lay down their arms and to stop looting. According to CENTCOM, more than 600 trucks had delivered aid and commercial goods into Gaza daily over the past week, with nearly 40 nations and international organizations coordinating humanitarian, logistical and security assistance into Gaza via the CMCC.

On 7 November, it was reported that the CMCC had taken over oversight of humanitarian aid entering the Gaza Strip, with Israel's Coordinator of Government Activities in the Territories taking on secondary role in deciding what enters Gaza. Early reports, according to the Guardian newspaper, indicated that Israel had given authority to the U.S. military to handle incoming goods. But, two months later, a U.S. official asserted that Israel remains in control of Gaza's perimeter and everything entering it. "It is an integration. It is hand in glove. They [the Israelis] remain the hand, and the CMCC have become the glove over that hand," said the official. Another contemporaneous article reported that the U.S. was making humanitarian demands of Israel that had been accepted, such as taking the "physical and financial burden" of removing debris from Gaza. The Office of Prime Minister Netanyahu did not respond to requests for comment on the report. It was later reported by the AFP that a diplomatic source told them “There are roundtables on everything" at the CMCC but “this isn’t where decisions are actually made.” He cited parallel channels, including a group supervised by an associate of US Middle East envoy Steve Witkoff, as having greater influence than the personal at the CMCC. US CENTCOM's Captain Tim Hawkin's responded to the AFP saying there were “frictions and challenges” but that “We are making progress ... while fully recognizing that there is more work ahead.”

In September 2026, Britain, France, and Canada condemned Israeli actions as terrorism. British Foreign Secretary Miliband announced a ban on trade with Israeli settlements, viewing these actions as ethnic cleansing in the West Bank. In response, Israel implemented retaliatory measures against the UK, including closing the British consulate in East Jerusalem. Additionally, removing the UK from the International Gaza Support Center limited its influence on Gaza's future.

== Personnel and contributing nations ==
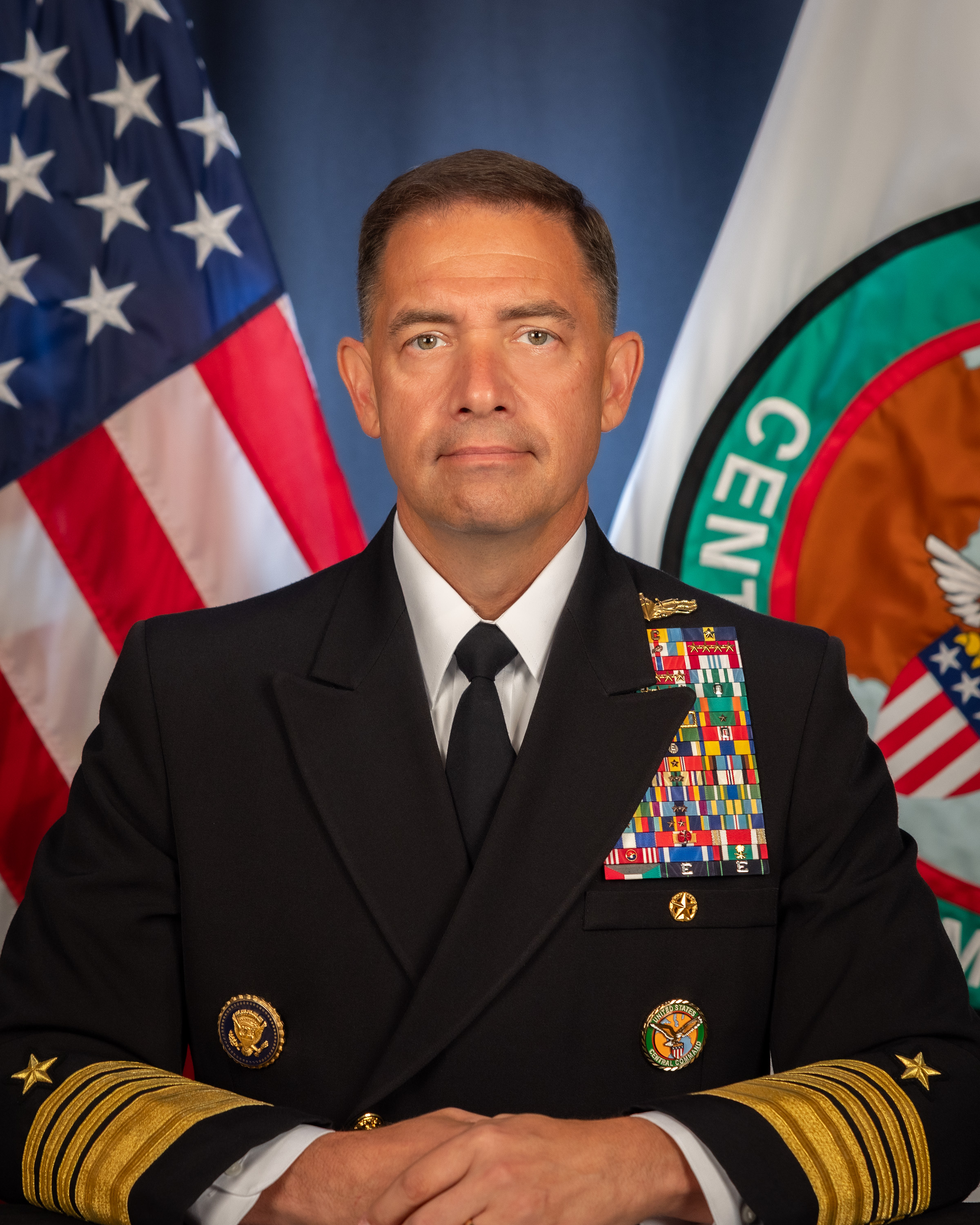
Admiral "Brad" Cooper, commander of the Civil-Military Coordination Center (CMCC)

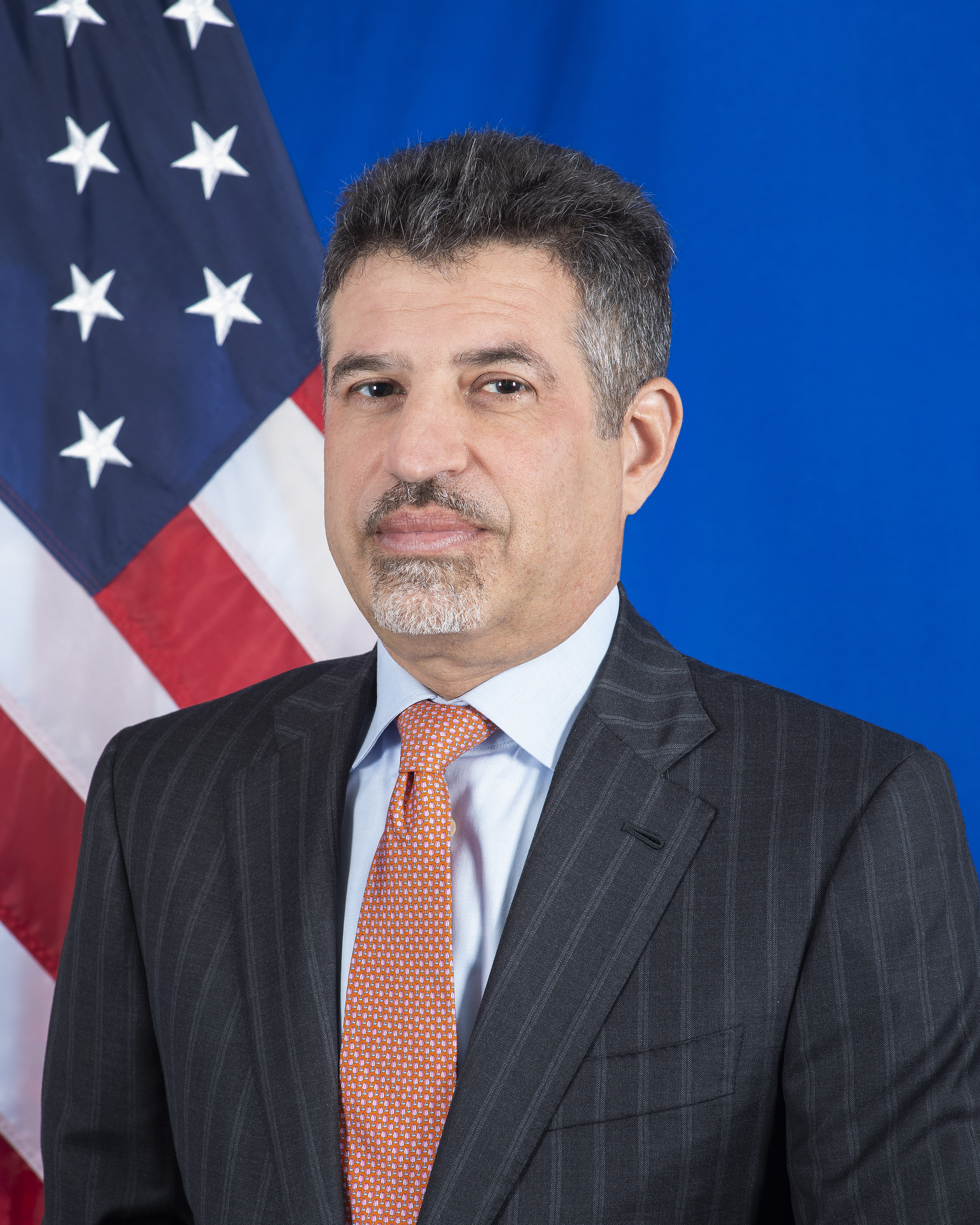
Steven Fagin, civilian lead of the CMCC

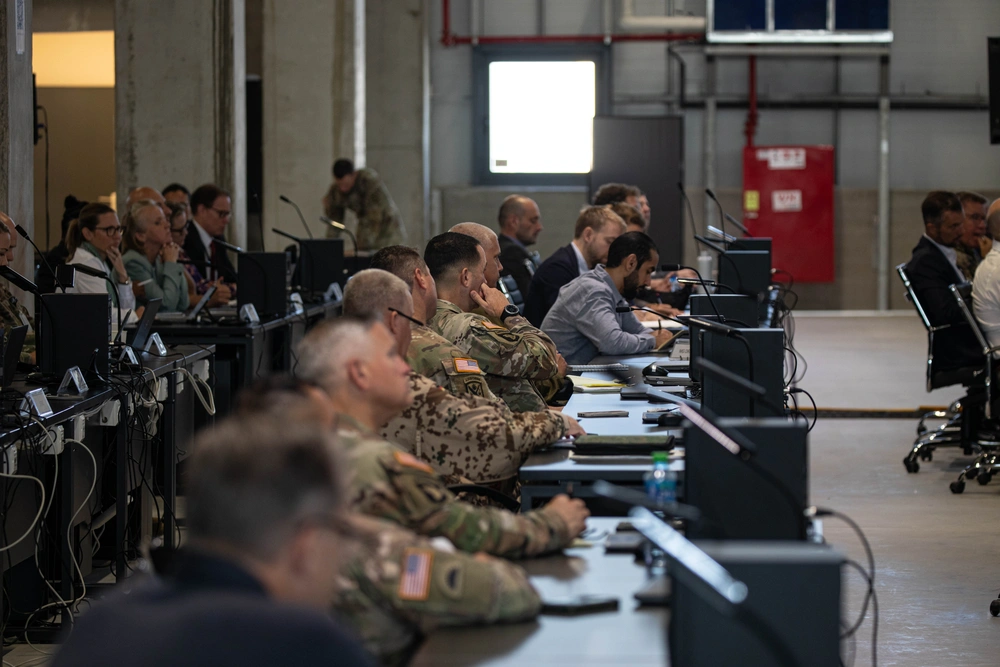
Personnel at the CMCC in Kiryat Gat, Israel on 23 October 2025

The CMCC is under the command of Admiral Brad Cooper, Commander of the United States Central Command and under him Lieutenant General Patrick Frank and a British deputy commander with the rank of two stars. American diplomat Steven Fagin was named civilian lead of the CMCC on 24 October 2025.

Approximately 200 US troops specializing in logistics, engineering, security, travel are to help facilitate "the flow of humanitarian, logistical, and security assistance from international counterparts into Gaza." US forces are not intended to be deployed within the Gaza Strip itself.

At the request of the US, the United Kingdom deployed a small team of military planning officers to the CMCC, including a two-star deputy commander.

Israeli prime minister Benjamin Netanyahu appointed Michael Eisenberg and brigadier general Yaki Dolf to serve as Israel's representatives at the CMCC.

The center is expected to also include personnel from Egypt, Qatar, Turkey and the United Arab Emirates. Germany plans to deploy three military personnel to the CMCC including a brigadier general. Additional countries have announced plans to post liaison officers at the CMCC including Jordan and Australia.

Humanitarian organizations operating at the center include United Nations agencies and the International Red Cross and Red Crescent Movement.

By 21 November, 2025 the number of personnel based at the centre had grown to around 600.

The European Union has been pushing for more inclusion of Palestinian representatives, including those from the Gaza Strip, at the CMCC. Current discussions about the future of Gaza are being made without Palestinian input as "US and Middle Eastern mediating countries 'are still putting together candidates' for the committee of Palestinian technocrats to be responsible for the postwar management of Gaza under the peace plan."

According to The Guardian, Israel is said to have been monitoring American and allied personnel at CMCC, leading US commander of the base to ask its Israeli counterpart to cease the recordings, a claim the Israeli military has dismissed as "absurd". The concerns have been voiced also by staff members and guests from other nations, who have been advised to refrain from sharing information that could be misused.

On August 25 2025, Israel announced the expulsion of Dutch representatives from the centre because of the Netherlands’ move to boycott Israeli products from settlements.

On the 20 January 2026, Reuters reported that some European nations were considering no longer sending personnel to the CMCC, while not formally leaving the facility so they can increase their presence later. Diplomats that spoke with Reuters off the record were unsatisfied with progress made by the CMCC in increasing aid to Gaza.

On April 10 2026, Israel notified Spain that its military contingent will no longer take part in the international Civil Military Coordination Center in Kiryat Gat.

In September 2026, Israel expelled the UK from the centre in retaliation for the UK's import ban on goods from Israeli settlements in the West Bank.

=== Contributing nations ===
As of 20 November 2025, the following countries have been confirmed to have posted personnel at the CMCC:

- Australia
- Canada
- Cyprus
- Denmark
- Egypt
- France
- Germany
- Greece
- Hungary
- Israel
- Italy
- Japan
- Jordan
- New Zealand - a liaison officer will work from the CMCC, initially for six weeks.
- Switzerland
- United Arab Emirates
- United States

Former contributors

- Netherlands
- Spain
- United Kingdom

== See also ==
- Gaza Strip under Resolution 2803
- International Stabilization Force
- Board of Peace
- United Nations Relief and Works Agency for Palestine Refugees in the Near East
- United Nations Truce Supervision Organization
- European Union Border Assistance Mission to Rafah
- List of non-UN peacekeeping missions
