= International Stabilization Force =

United Nations mandated multinational peacekeeping force for the Gaza Strip

- قوة الاستقرار الدولية
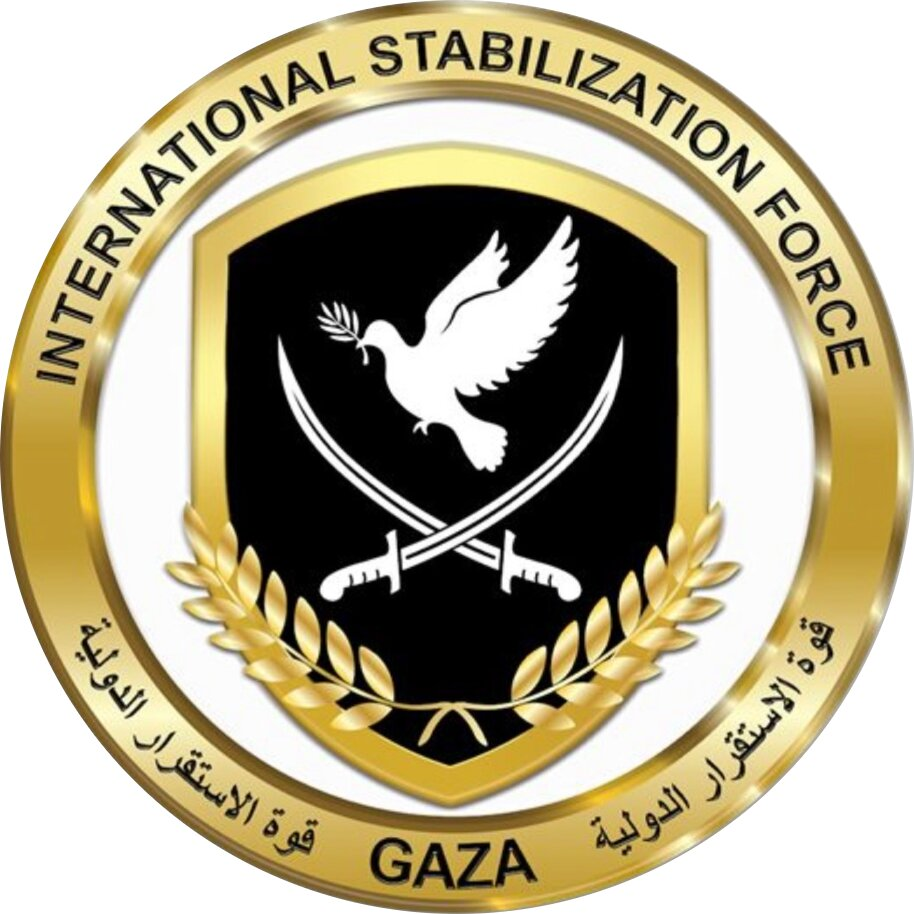
- Emblem
- Founded: Mandated by United Nations Security Council Resolution 2803 on 17 November 2025
- Allegiance: Board of Peace
- Type: Multinational peacekeeping force

Commanders
- Chairman for Life of the Board of Peace: Donald Trump
- Current commander: Jasper Jeffers (USA)
- Deputy commander: TBA (Indonesia)

The International Stabilization Force (ISF) is a United Nations-mandated multinational peacekeeping force outlined in the Gaza peace plan agreed by Hamas and Israel in October 2025. The force's stated aims are to help provide security, train a new Palestinian police force, and oversee the demilitarization and redevelopment of the Gaza Strip.

== Background ==
The Gaza war began on October 7, 2023, following a series of coordinated armed attacks carried out by Hamas and several other Palestinian militant groups in southern Israel.

Proposals to deploy a multinational peacekeeping force in the Gaza Strip was initially proposed by former British prime minister Tony Blair in a draft peace plan developed in July 2025 which Blair discussed with US president Donald Trump and his adviser Jared Kushner in August 2025. Trump presented a 20-point peace plan to end the Gaza War in September 2025, which included provisions for an internationally supervised interim government for the Gaza Strip and an Arab-led multinational peacekeeping force. On 8 October 2025, Trump announced that Israeli and Palestinian negotiators had agreed to accept the first phase of his proposed peace plan. The agreement was signed by both parties the following day and came into effect on 10 October 2025.

Hamas, which continues to control roughly half of the Gaza Strip, has rejected any imposed international guardianship plan. Reportedly, many countries want to ensure their troops would be peacekeeping with the consent of all parties, as opposed to having to fight Hamas forces.

== Purpose ==
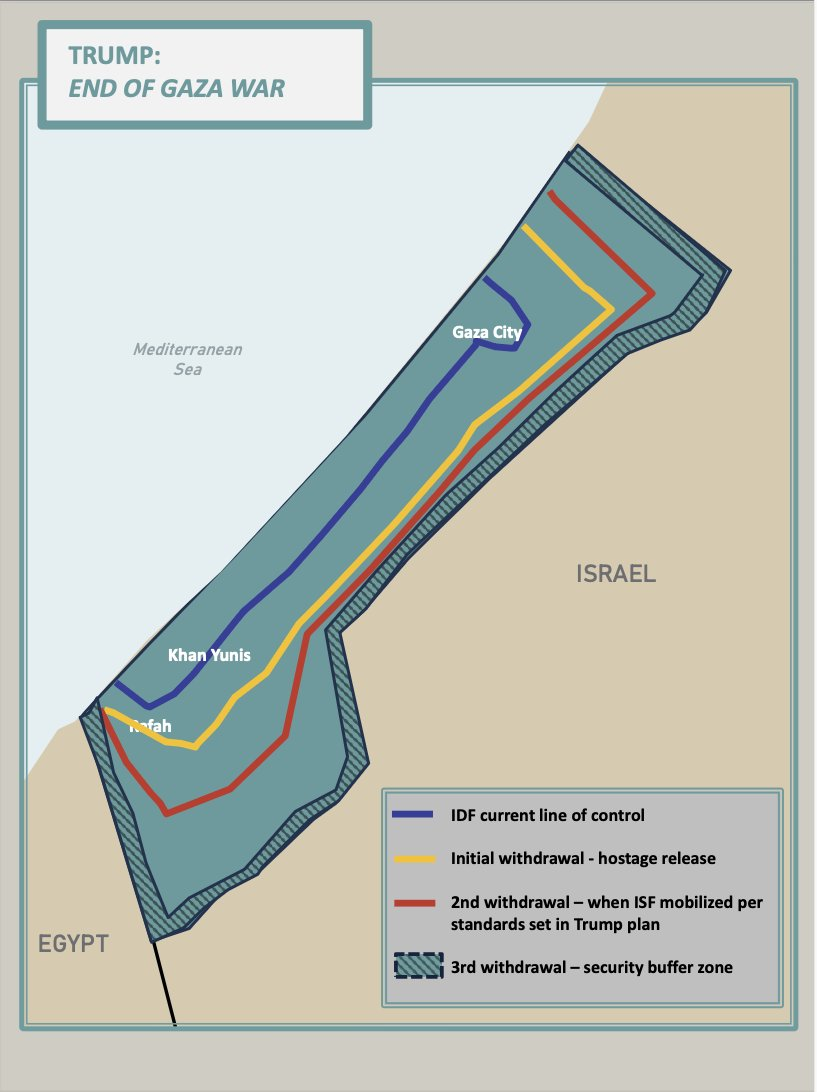
Map of proposed withdrawal of the Israeli armed forces from the Gaza Strip

Under the proposal, a multinational peacekeeping force, and locally recruited civilian police force would be deployed into the Gaza Strip accompanied by a withdrawal of the Israel Defense Forces from the territory. The primary goal of the ISF is to create a secure, demilitarized, and "terror-free" Gaza that poses no threat to its neighbors. It would accomplish this by supporting the dismantling of Hamas' military infrastructure, including tunnels and weapons production facilities.

=== Core functions ===
The ISF mandate includes:

- Supporting demilitarization and destruction of terror infrastructure
- Securing border areas with Israel and Egypt
- Protecting civilians and humanitarian operations
- Training vetted Palestinian police forces
- Facilitating humanitarian corridors
- Assisting the Board of Peace in monitoring the ceasefire

As the ISF takes control and establishes stability, the Israel Defense Forces (IDF) is required to withdraw from Gaza in a staged process based on agreed-upon milestones and timelines. A security perimeter is intended to remain in place until Gaza is deemed secure.

== Preparations ==
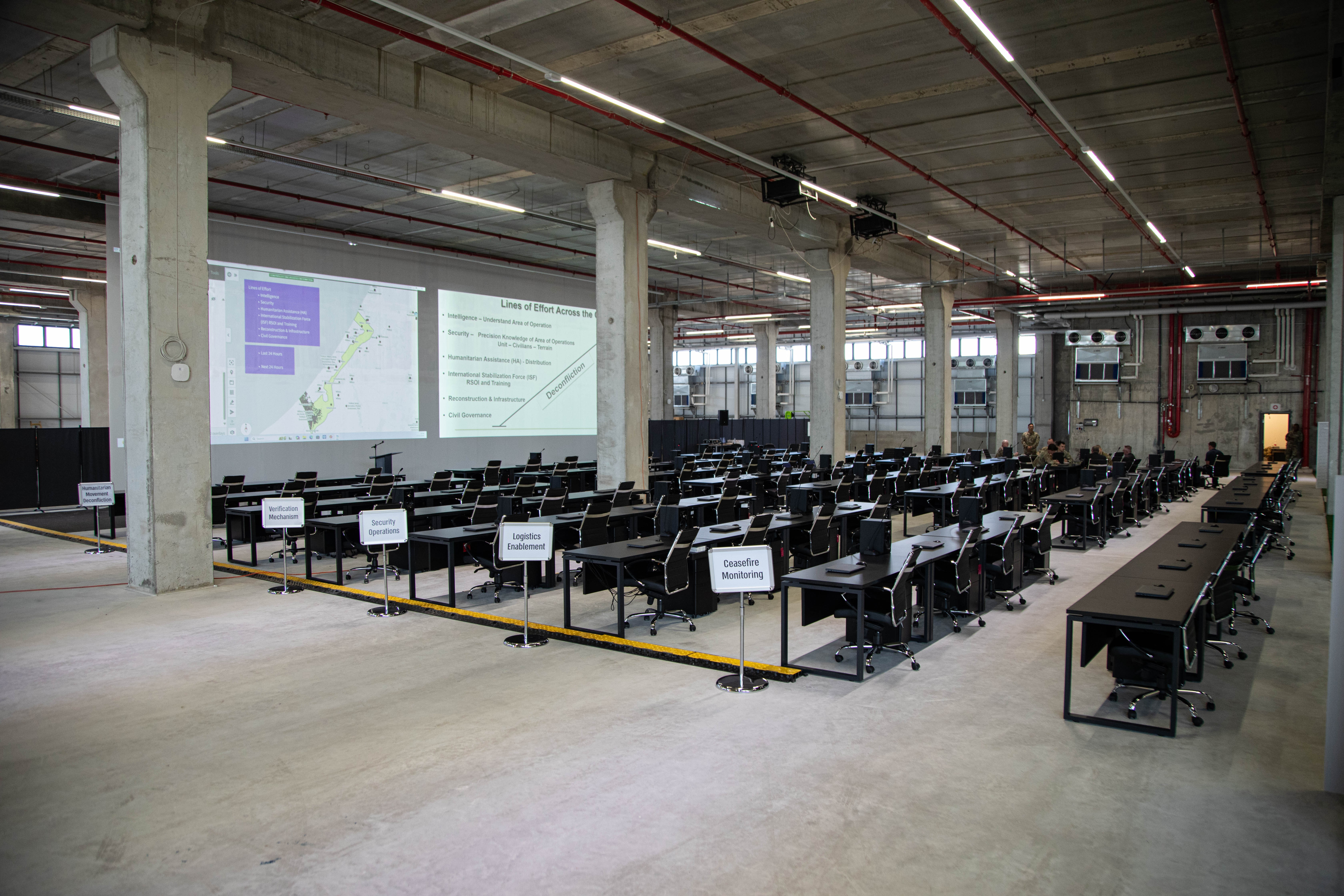
Civil-Military Coordination Center (CMCC) Kiryat Gat, Israel in October 2025

Following the first phase of the Gaza war peace plan coming into effect on 10 October 2025, a multinational joint task force is to be established to monitor the ceasefire.

On 15 October, it was reported that about 25 US personnel were in the region serving in a coordination and oversight role for the international stabilization force which is starting to be constructed.

On 17 October, it was reported that the US, UK and France were working on the text of a United Nations Security Council resolution which would give the ISF a mandate similar to the international security support mission in Haiti.

A Civil-Military Coordination Center (CMCC), under the leadership of Brad Cooper, head of US Central Command was set up shortly after the ceasefire agreement came into effect on 10 October 2025. The center aims to help facilitate the flow of humanitarian, logistical, and security assistance from international counterparts into Gaza.

On 3 November 2025, after Jordan and Germany declared that the ISF would need to have a UN mandate, the United States submitted a draft resolution to the United Nations Security Council that would authorize the Stabilization Force for two years under the direction of a Board of Peace. The draft underwent two further revisions before being adopted as United Nations Security Council Resolution 2803 on 17 November 2025.

The Egyptian government began to establish a command centre for the ISF in El Arish in December 2025.

United States Central Command hosted a planning conference on the command structure and deployment of the ISF on 16 December 2025 in Qatar. Countries attending included Cyprus, Georgia, Canada, Germany, Netherlands, Jordan, Japan, Greece, Singapore, the EU, Saudi Arabia, Poland, Hungary, Bulgaria, Pakistan, Uzbekistan, Kuwait, Morocco, Bahrain, Bosnia & Herzegovina, Finland, Kosovo, Kazakhstan, Indonesia, Spain, and Yemen.

On 17 January 2026, it was announced that Major General Jasper Jeffers had been appointed as Commander of the International Stabilization Force. Jeffers' permanent position is Commander, Special Operations Command Central of United States Central Command.

On August 9, 2026, Israeli TV channel 12 reported that actual preparations for deployment of the force in parts of the Gaza Strip has begun.

== Contributing nations ==
=== Confirmed contributors ===
Several countries have publicly committed troops to the ISF:

- Indonesia – has committed a substantial contingent and will serve as deputy commander of the force.
- Morocco – pledged military personnel.
- Kazakhstan – will deploy units including medical support.
- Kosovo – committed forces.
- Albania – pledged troops.
- Uganda – agreed to deploy troops.

=== Support roles and training ===
- Egypt and Jordan have pledged to train police forces as part of the broader stabilization effort.

=== Countries listed as interested ===
Other nations were reported as showing interest in contributing troops or support roles, but have not publicly confirmed deployments:

- Egypt, Qatar, United Arab Emirates. Turkey, Pakistan, Azerbaijan, Australia, Malaysia, Canada, France, Cyprus, Greece, Bangladesh, Bosnia and Herzegovina, Ethiopia, Italy, Burundi

=== Notes on participation ===
- Saudi Arabia and the UAE were reported to have declined participation in the force itself, focusing on financial and humanitarian support.
- Although Pakistan was listed as interested in past sources, it was not among the nations publicly announced as committing troops at the inaugural Board of Peace meeting.
- Georgia and Vietnam are reported to have entered advanced talks regarding troop contributions to the ISF, though neither country has commented on the report.

== See also ==
- United Nations Relief and Works Agency for Palestine Refugees in the Near East – UN agency supporting Palestinian refugees
- United Nations Truce Supervision Organization – UN peacekeeping mission in the Middle East
- European Union Border Assistance Mission to Rafah – Civilian Crisis Management Mission in Gaza
- Temporary International Presence in Hebron – Civilian observer mission in the West Bank, 1994-2019
- List of non-UN peacekeeping missions
- List of United Nations peacekeeping missions
- Multinational Force–Ukraine – Proposed force for peace enforcement
