= Yaakov Dolf =

Israeli military officer

- יעקב (יקי) דולף
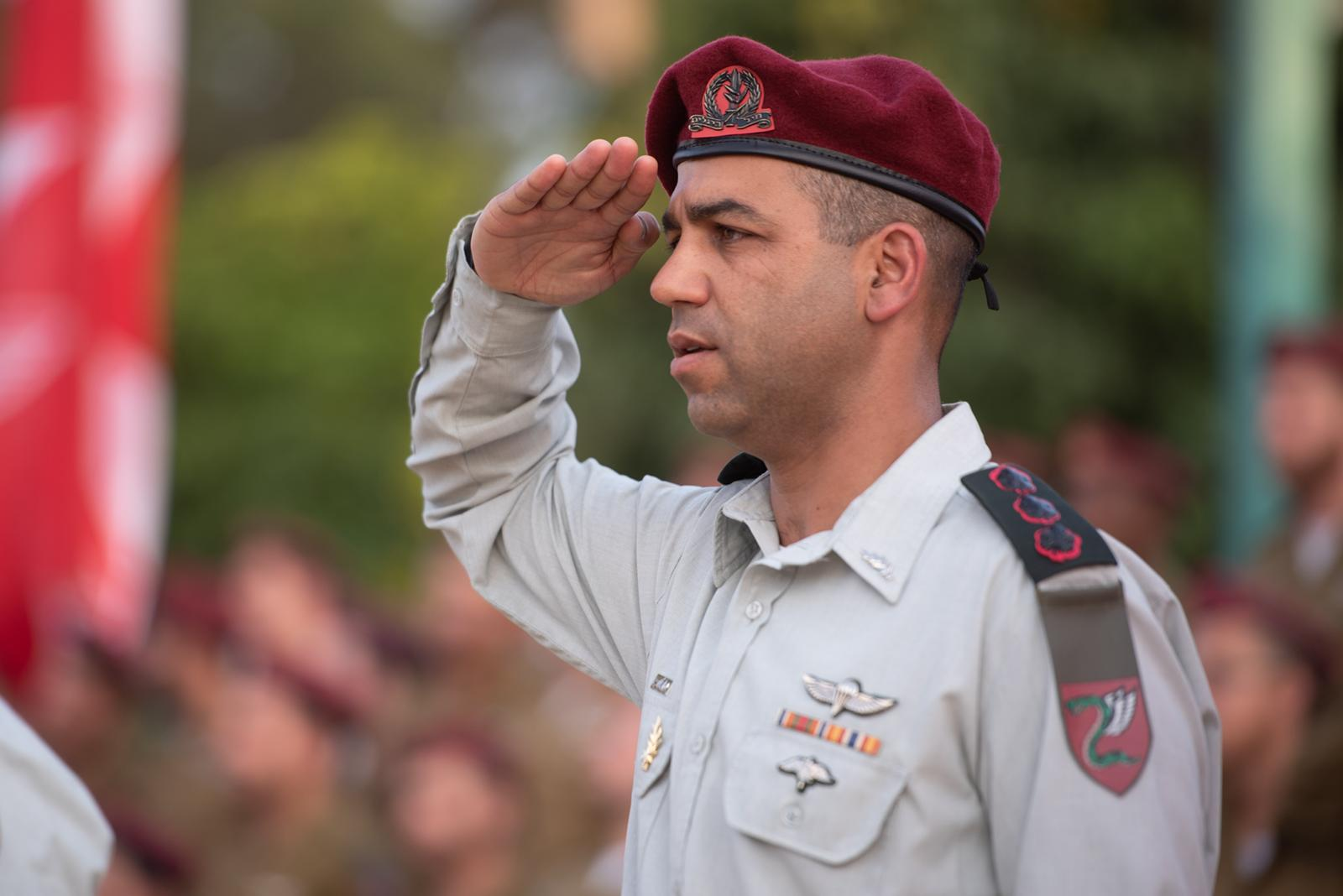
- Yaakov Dolf, June 2019
- Born: Israel
- Military career
- Allegiance: Israel
- Branch: Israel Defense Forces
- Service years: 1994–
- Rank: Tat Aluf (Brig. General)
- Nickname: Yaki
- Unit: Paratroopers Brigade
- Commands: 890 "Efe" (Echis) paratroop battalion, Reserve Paratroopers Brigade, Regional Brigade in the Gaza Division, Paratroopers Brigade
- Conflicts: South Lebanon conflict (1985–2000); Second Intifada; 2006 Lebanon War; Operation Cast Lead; Operation Pillar of Defense; Operation Protective Edge

Yaakov (Yaki) Dolf (Hebrew: יעקב (יקי) דולף; born 7 January 1976) is an IDF officer with the rank of General, serving as the commander of the Northern Corps. Previously, he served as the Commander of the Judea and Samaria Division, Military Secretary to the Minister of Defense, commander of the Paratroopers Brigade, and the Northern Gaza Brigade. In October 2025 he was appointed to serve as the IDF's representative in the CMCC, which oversees the ceasefire in the Gaza strip.

== Military career ==
Dolf was drafted into the IDF in 1994. He volunteered as a paratrooper in the Paratroopers Brigade. He served as a soldier and a squad leader in the 890th Battalion. He became an infantry officer after completing Officer Candidate School and return to the Paratroopers Brigade as a platoon leader and company commander in counter-guerrilla operations in the South Lebanon security zone. Later on he served as the Brigade's Executive officer during the 2006 Lebanon War, and during Operation Cast Lead Dolf led the 890th Paratroopers Battalion. Afterwards he commanded a Regional Brigade in the Gaza Division and a reserve Paratroopers Brigade. In 2017 he was named commander of the Paratroopers Brigade and served in this position until 2021. During his tenure as the commander of the Paratroopers Brigade, he was reprimanded over the deaths of two recruits during training exercises. He was subsequently appointed military secretary to Defense Minister Benny Gantz. In July 2022, it was announced that he would succeed Avi Bluth as commander of the Judea and Samaria Division.
