= European Union Integrated Rule of Law Mission in Iraq =

EU mission to improve the rule of law in Iraq

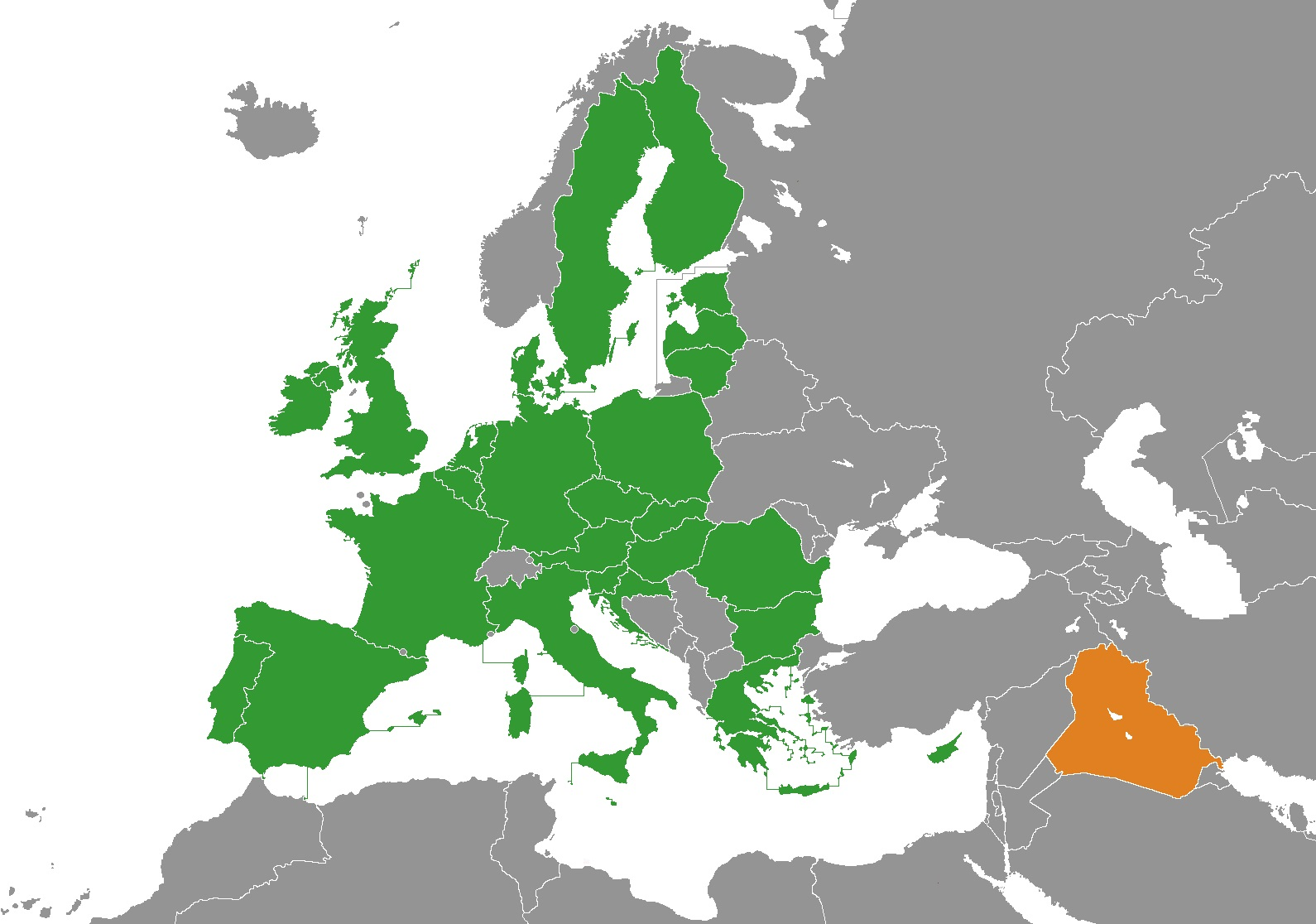
- Map with the European Union in green and Iraq in orange.
- Headquarters: Baghdad, Iraq
- Parent organization: European Union

The European Union Integrated Rule of Law Mission in Iraq, (EUJUST LEX), is a European Union mission to support and train judges, prison officials and other justice-sector workers in Iraq, to improve the rule of law and protection for human rights.

EUJUST LEX is part of the European Union's External Action service. The mission has around 50-60 staff, with members from several different EU (and non-EU) states. It is divided into three main teams - supporting courts, police, and prisons respectively.

== History ==
Support for the rule of law was requested by Ibrahim al-Jaafari, who was president of Iraq's interim government. EUJUST LEX was created by decision 6328/05 of the Council of the European Union; it started operations in July 2005, with Stephen White as the head of mission. The mandate has been extended repeatedly; the most recent extension, approved in June 2012 by a meeting of 27 EU ambassadors, continues until 31 December 2013. It was initially headquartered in Brussels, for security reasons, with a small liaison office in the British embassy in Baghdad; but this moved to Baghdad in early 2011. There are also offices in Erbil and Basra.

As of 2012, EUJUST LEX had trained over 5000 Iraqi officials and the total cost of the mission was around €118 million.

== See also ==
- Iraq–European Union relations
