= Jasper Jeffers =

American military officer

Jasper Jeffers III
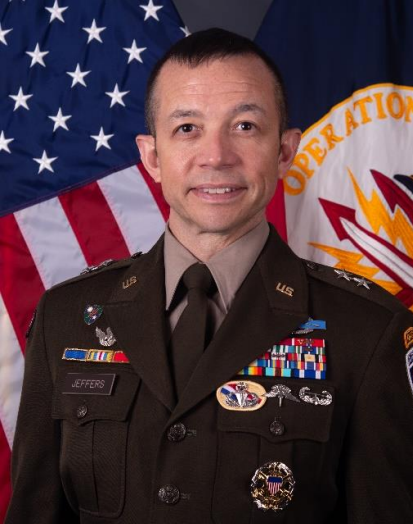
- Official portrait, 2026
- Born: 1970 (age 55–56); Ripplemead, Virginia, U.S.
- Alma mater: Virginia Tech (BA)
- Military career
- Allegiance: United States
- Branch: United States Army
- Service years: 1990–present
- Rank: Major General
- Commands: International Stabilisation Force
- Conflicts: War in Afghanistan; Operation Enduring Freedom; Operation Resolute Support; Operation Inherent Resolve

Jasper Jeffers III is an American military officer serving as the commander of the International Stabilization Force, a United Nations-mandated peacekeeping force in the Gaza Strip.

== Early life and education ==
Jasper Jeffers III was born to a family active in the lumber industry in Ripplemead, Virginia. He attended Virginia Polytechnic Institute and State University in Blacksburg, Virginia, serving in the Virginia Tech Corps of Cadets and the Reserve Officers' Training Corps. He graduated from the university in 1996 with bachelor's degrees in political science and government.

== Military career ==
After graduation, Jeffers joined the United States Army in 1996, serving as an operations officer and rifle platoon leader in the 10th Mountain Division light infantry, stationed at Fort Drum, New York. He later transferred to the 75th Ranger Regiment and served as a rifle platoon leader. He was then transferred to Fort Lewis, where served as Air Operations Officer and company commander of 1st Battalion, 5th Infantry Regiment, 1st Brigade, 25th Infantry Division. In April 2003, he served as Air Operations Officer and was a company commander with 2nd Ranger Battalion of the 75th Ranger Regiment where he deployed to Iraq to conduct combat operations 2003 invasion of Iraq. He was later deployed to Afghanistan, serving in Operation Enduring Freedom, the 2001–2014 campaign of American military actions in Afghanistan.

Jeffers graduated from the United States Army Command and General Staff College in 2007, and was promoted to the rank of lieutenant colonel. He was assigned to the US Army Special Operations Command at Fort Bragg, North Carolina. He attended a counterterrorism and public policy fellowship program at Duke University from 2015 to 2016, after which he was assigned to the Joint Forces Command, leading the 1st and 2nd brigades of the 7th Infantry Division. About a year later, he was transferred to Afghanistan, where he became an advisor to the commander of Operation Resolute Support, the country's NATO military mission.

Jeffers led a brigade under the Army Special Operations Command during Operation Inherent Resolve, the United States military operation against the Islamic State. He became a part of the Joint Staff as a deputy director for counterrorism and special operation. In June 2024, he was appointed as the commander of the Special Operations Command Central at MacDill Air Force Base.

In November 2024, Jeffers traveled to Beirut to take up his appointment as the co-chair of the "implementation and monitoring mechanism" for the 2024 Israel–Lebanon ceasefire agreement, following the 2024 Israeli invasion of Lebanon. In January 2026, the Second Trump Administration appointed Jeffers as the commander of the International Stabilization Force, a United Nations-mandated peacekeeping force overseeing security operations in the Gaza Strip as part of the 2025 peace plan to end the Gaza war, a multiyear conflict between Israel and the Palestinian militant and political organization Hamas which resulted in the Israeli military occupation of much of the strip.
