= War in South Ossetia =

War in South Ossetia may refer to:

- Georgian–Ossetian conflict (1918–1920)
- 1991–1992 South Ossetia War
- 2008 Russo-Georgian War

== See also ==
- Georgian–Ossetian conflict
