= European Union Military Operation in the Central African Republic =

- Logo of the force
- Active: February 10, 2014 – March 15, 2015
- Countries: Estonia; Finland; France; Georgia; Morocco; Italy; Latvia; Luxembourg (advisory); Netherlands; Poland; Portugal; Romania; Spain
- Allegiance: European Union (with United Nations mandate)
- Role: Peacekeeping
- Size: 700 troops
- Headquarters: Bangui, Central African Republic
- Nickname: EUFOR RCA
- Website: eeas.europa.eu/archives/csdp/missions-and-operations/eufor-rca/index_en.htm

Commanders
- Commander: Major General Philippe Pontiès

Common Security and Defence Policy Service Medal with a EUFOR RCA clasp

European Union Force RCA, commonly referred as EUFOR RCA, was the United Nations-mandated European Union peacekeeping mission in Bangui, capital of the Central African Republic. The goal of the mission was to stabilize the area after more than a year of internal conflict. Agreement about the mission was reached in January 2014, and the first operations started at the end of April. The mission ended its mandate after nearly a year on 15 March 2015.

== Background ==
In 2012 the Central African Republic was embroiled in internal conflict, resulting in the ousting of the Christian president François Bozizé in March 2013. Michel Djotodia, the leader of Muslim Séléka rebels, assumed the presidency but was himself forced to resign in January 2014. According to the UN Refugee Agency, 37,000 people have escaped to neighboring countries, while 173,000 have been internally displaced. In December 2013, peacekeeping missions Operation Sangaris by France and MISCA by the African Union were mounted.

On 20 January 2014, EU foreign ministers reached agreement for the creation of EUFOR RCA, which is the ninth EU military operation in the framework of the Common Security and Defence Policy. On 28 January, United Nations Security Council resolution 2134 approved deployment of the EU force into the Central African Republic. The military operation was established on 10 February, with Major General Philippe Pontiès as its commander.

== Deployment ==
On 30 April 2014, EUFOR RCA started its first major operation by taking over security at the Bangui M'Poko International Airport.

The initial force consisted of 150 troops, and was contributed by former colonial power France and by Estonia. During May and June troops from Finland, Georgia, Latvia, Netherlands, Poland, Portugal, Romania and Spain as well as military advisors from Luxembourg joined the force. On 15 June it achieved full operational capability with 700 troops. The EU mission was planned to last for half a year, with the overall goal to secure a safe environment in the Bangui area, and afterwards hand it over to African partners who were planned to arrive with a 12,000 troop United Nations peacekeeper force in September. On 28 August 2014, troops from Italy joined the force with 50 paratroopers from Folgore Parachute Brigade.

== See also ==
- EUFOR Tchad/RCA
- European Union Training Mission in the Central African Republic
- Mission de formation de l'Union européenne en République centrafricaine
