= European Union Partnership Mission in Moldova =

Planned unarmed civilian mission of the European Union in Moldova

European Union Partnership Mission in the Republic of Moldova

- Map of Europe with the European Union in green and Moldova in orange.
- Abbreviation: EUPM Moldova
- Formation: 24 April 2023
- Headquarters: Chișinău
- Civilian Operation Commander: Stefano Tomat
- Head of Mission: Cosmin Dinescu
- Parent organization: European Union
- Staff: 40
- Website: www.eeas.europa.eu/eupm-moldova

The European Union Partnership Mission in the Republic of Moldova (EUPM Moldova), is a European Union (EU) Common Security and Defence Policy (CSDP) civilian mission in Moldova that was established on 24 April 2023 for an initial mandate of two years. The Mission was established at the formal request of the authorities of the Republic of Moldova and is to contribute to the strengthening of Moldova’s crisis management structures and to enhance its resilience to hybrid threats, including cybersecurity, and countering foreign information manipulation and interference (FIMI).

On 20 May 2025, the Council of the European Union adopted a decision extending the European Union Partnership Mission in Moldova (EUPM) for a further two years, until 31 May 2027, with a budget allocation of over €19.8million for the period. The mandate of EUPM Moldova was adjusted to increase the provision of strategic advice to the Moldovan authorities in the security sector. The mission can have up to 72 permanent staff members, including international and local staff.

== History and context ==
The efforts to destabilise the Republic of Moldova have noticeably increased since the beginning of the Russian war of aggression against Ukraine, and represent a direct threat to the stability and security of the external borders of the EU. In its conclusions of 15 December 2022, the European Council affirmed that the EU would continue to provide all relevant support to the Republic of Moldova as it deals with the multifaceted impact of Russia’s war of aggression against Ukraine.

In a letter to the High Representative dated 28 January 2023, the Prime Minister of the Republic of Moldova invited the EU to deploy a civilian mission in the country under the CSDP.

With this Mission, the EU supports the Republic of Moldova in increasing its resilience and stability, and in increasing stability and security in the whole region. The mission was established on 24 April 2023 and launched on 22 May 2023 following a decision of the Foreign Affairs Council. Its Headquarters in Chisinau, Republic of Moldova, was inaugurated during the visit of EU High Representative Josep Borrell on 31 May 2023. Romanian diplomat Cosmin Dinescu was appointed Head of Mission on 27 April 2023. The Mission had an initial mandate of two years, which was renewed by a further two years, until 31 May 2027, by decision of the Council of the European Union.

== Mandate ==
The mission has a mandate to support the authorities of the Republic of Moldova to increase the resilience of the security sector in the areas of crisis management and hybrid threats, including cybersecurity and countering foreign information manipulation and interference (FIMI). In order to achieve this, EUPM provides strategic advice, training and operational support (including equipment). The Mission has three Lines of Operations: 1) contribute to strengthening the crisis management structures; 2) support in enhancing resilience to hybrid threats, including cybersecurity and FIMI; 3) a Project cell that implements projects in the above mentioned fields of activity, offering targeted operational support, as needed, in line with the Integrated Approach and, as far as possible, in close coordination with other actors. The mandate of the civilian CSDP Mission is a non-executive one, which means that the Mission offers support based on the "advise, train and equip" approach, but the decision to take action and responsibility to implement decisions rests with the authorities of the Republic of Moldova. EUPM Moldova is also a scalable and modular civilian CSDP mission. Its permanent international staff may be temporarily increased with Visiting Experts and Specialised Teams, depending on the needs and requirements of the authorities of the Republic of Moldova, within the Mission approved mandate.

== See also ==
- European Union Mission in Armenia
- European Union Military Assistance Mission in support of Ukraine
