= European Union Police Mission in Afghanistan =

Diplomatic mission

EUPOL Afghanistan logo

EUPOL Afghanistan (2007–2016) was a European Union mission supporting the reform efforts of the Afghan government in building a civilian police service in Afghanistan.

== Background ==
EUPOL Afghanistan was part of the European Union's External Action service. It was one of the EU's civilian Common Security and Defence Policy missions and was set up in 2007 to assist the Afghan government in reforming its police service. Reforming the security sector is a crucial element of the international community's efforts to rebuild Afghanistan. Decades of armed conflict in the country had left the Afghan National Police (ANP) with multiple challenges – the ANP is at the forefront of the fight against the insurgency and consequently often suffers heavy casualties. Endemic corruption is another major challenge facing the ANP.

EUPOL Afghanistan was closed in the end of 2016.

== Objectives ==
The Member States of the European Union set the following objectives for the mission: "EUPOL Afghanistan shall significantly contribute to the establishment of sustainable and effective civilian policing arrangements under Afghan ownership, which will ensure appropriate interaction with the wider criminal justice system, in keeping with the policy advice and institution building work of the community, Member States and other international actors. Furthermore, the Mission will support the reform process towards a trusted and efficient police service, which works in accordance with international standards, within the framework of the rule of law and respects human rights."

== Activities ==
EUPOL advisers worked on a strategic level with the Afghan Ministry of Interior Affairs in the professionalisation of the ANP and the institutional reform of the Ministry of Interior Affairs (MoI). EUPOL did not have an executive mandate, which means that it did not do actual policing. EUPOL's main partners for cooperation included senior leadership of the Afghan Ministry of Interior, from the Afghan National Police, relevant rule of law actors such as Afghan prosecutors to other international actors supporting the development of the police and the rule of law in Afghanistan.

EUPOL supported the production of the Afghan police detective TV series, "Commissar Amanullah", which helped reach out to the public in a country where literacy levels are still low. The series treated its viewers to fast and furious action as well as behind the scenes reports on the professional work of a criminal investigation unit in Afghanistan. Topics that were then part of EUPOL's mandate such as community policing, criminal investigation, female police recruitment, gender, human rights and police-prosecutor cooperation were incorporated into the series.

One of the most tangible achievements of EUPOL Afghanistan was the establishment of training institutions such as the Afghan Police Staff College in 2010. Funding for the project was provided by the European Union. As of September 2012, at least 4000 Afghan police had attended courses at the college. Responsibility for training has gradually been handed over to Afghan instructors. The College, which is entirely under Afghan management since 2014, trains police leaders and teachers providing a wide range of specialised courses in management and human rights awareness.

In further efforts geared towards the professionalisation of the Afghan National Police, EUPOL also supported the Crime Management College, which was inaugurated in Kabul on 17 March 2014, as a result of close cooperation between the European Union Delegation, EUPOL Afghanistan and the Afghan Ministry of Interior. The Crime Management College provides a modern environment for the development of expertise in investigative techniques and delivery of investigative training.

Furthermore, EUPOL helped establish the Afghanistan-wide toll-free emergency number 119, supported by several international actors including the United Nations Development Programme (UNDP) and the Combined Security Transition Command Afghanistan (CSTC-A). EUPOL's role focused on providing the call centers with training in 2009.

Between 2007 and 2014, the main modus operandi for the implementation of EUPOL's mandate was training and mentoring. From 2015 onward, all mentoring activities were discontinued and the Mission fully transformed to advising the Ministry of Interior and the Afghan National Police on a strategic level.

Finnish senior diplomat Ms. Pia Stjernvall was appointed as the Head of Mission in February 2015. The last Deputy Head of Mission was General Inspector Tarmo Miilits from the Estonian police.

EUPOL has suffered casualties as a result of several terrorist attacks. Three civilians were killed in two separate attacks in January 2014 and May 2015.

== History ==
EUPOL Afghanistan was launched in June 2007, under the leadership of the high-ranking officer of the Spanish Guardia Civil Mr. Francisco Rodriguez Lorenzo, as the first Acting Head of Mission on the ground, following work by the German Police Project Office. It established its headquarters in Kabul. The Mission deployed field offices in 11 Afghan provinces in 2008 and increased their number to 16 in 2009. EUPOL's field offices provided support to local Afghan counterparts, including provincial police commanders and prosecutors, covering the main areas of the Mission's mandate. After gradually closing down the majority of its field offices over the years, EUPOL also shut down its remaining field offices in Herat, Mazar-e-Sharif and Kabul in 2015.

In May 2010, the Council of the European Union extended the Mission's mandate until May 2013, and in November 2012 again by another 18 months. In December 2014, the Council decided to extend the mandate until December 2016.

Since its establishment, the Mission employed up to 350 international and over 200 national staff. The number of EUPOL staff gradually went down in the run-up to the closure of the Mission at the end of 2016. In December 2016, the mission consisted of approximately 112 international experts from 22 EU member states and 122 Afghan national staff members.

== Achievements ==
EUPOL Afghanistan made a significant contribution to the development of civilian policing and the rule of law in Afghanistan, gaining widespread recognition for its expertise and support in this field. During more than 9 years of partnership, EUPOL worked intensively with the Afghan Ministry of Interior Affairs (MoI), the Ministry of Justice, the Afghan National Police (ANP) and many other Afghan stakeholders.

Reforming the Afghan Ministry of Interior Affairs: EUPOL and the leadership of the Afghan MoI worked together to develop the MoI's capacity and authority. This entailed the strengthening of the strategic management skills of senior police leaders, among others. EUPOL also supported the development of key policies and strategies of the MoI such as the National Police Strategy or the Community Policing concept.

Oversight and monitoring structures within the MoI were created with the support of EUPOL advisers: This included supporting the setting up of the Ministry's General Directorate of Monitoring and Evaluation as well as the development of the Inspector General's Office, in charge of investigating corruption, police misconduct and enforcing accountability within the MoI.

Professionalisation of the ANP and its leadership: Sustainable training of a professional civilian police service: EUPOL was particularly successful in supporting the development of Afghan training institutions. The Police Staff College and the Crime Management College are two such outcomes of EUPOL's support for the development of the ANP's training capability to become self-sustaining. Both colleges, joint projects between the Afghan MoI, the EU Delegation and EUPOL are now fully under Afghan leadership. The Police Staff College, which offers bachelor and master level degree programmes, and the Crime Management College, which was established to improve the investigative and intelligence capacity of the ANP, represent an enduring legacy for EUPOL.

Community policing - seeking the trust of citizens: Community policing as a concept has become increasingly embedded in day-to-day police work. Despite challenges surrounding wider implementation, it is now seen as the desired approach for future policing in Afghanistan.

Championing the role of female officers in the ANP: EUPOL supported the capacity building of female police officers. In order to increase recruitment and retention rates, the Mission also promoted the need for better working conditions, including career prospects, non-discriminatory measures and efforts to address harassment. On an institutional level, attitudes toward women in the ANP are changing for the better. Female officers are now increasingly carrying out substantive police duties including crime scene investigations and recording of evidence, roles which would have been inconceivable for female officers when EUPOL was first established.

Increased awareness of human rights: EUPOL has actively promoted the inclusion of human rights and gender into ANP structures and operations. The Mission worked closely with the leadership of the MoI to support the development of relevant policies and decision-making. Furthermore, EUPOL had a leading role in advising the review of ANP disciplinary procedures as well as in developing the ANP Code of Conduct and promoting its awareness.

Strengthening the rule of law: Since 2008, EUPOL has played a key role in supporting the harmonisation of Afghan laws with relevant universal rule of law and human rights standards, as well as in supporting the amendment of existing laws or the drafting of new pieces of legislation relevant to the criminal justice sector. In this regard, EUPOL worked closely with the Ministry of Justice and senior legal advisers from the Afghan government.

The Mission also enhanced criminal justice linkages, firstly, and most predominantly at the level of cooperation between police and prosecutors. Tangible results in this regard were the development of concrete training tools and manuals on police-prosecutor cooperation; a better institutionalised relationship between MoI and Attorney General's Office; the establishment of an Afghan trainers pool; and the delivery of residential courses in all field office locations.

EUPOL also worked on improving referral mechanisms between the ANP and legal aid providers, among them the Afghan Independent Bar Association, in order to ensure better access to justice.

Coordination of efforts in police reform: EUPOL supported the International Police Coordination Board and fostered a working culture of cooperation and coordination with other members of the EU family and other international partners such as the UN and the NATO-led ISAF/RS missions.
