= European Union Training Mission in Mali =

EU force to train Mali's army and police

European Union Training Mission Mali
- Commanded by: (Spain) Brig. Gen. Santiago Fernandez Ortiz-Repiso
- Date: 17 January 2013 – 17 May 2024
- Executed by: Albania; Austria; Belgium; Bulgaria; Czech Republic; Estonia; Finland; France; Georgia; Germany; Greece; Hungary; Ireland; Italy; Latvia; Lithuania; Luxembourg; Moldova; Montenegro; Netherlands; Portugal; Romania; Serbia; Slovakia; Slovenia; Spain; Sweden

EUTM Mali (European Union Training Mission in Mali) was a European Union multinational military training mission headquartered in Bamako, Mali.

22 EU member states (Austria, Belgium, Bulgaria, Czechia, Estonia, Finland, France, Germany, Greece, Hungary, Ireland, Italy, Latvia, Lithuania, Luxembourg, Netherlands, Portugal, Romania, Slovakia, Slovenia, Spain, Sweden) along with 4 non-EU countries (Serbia, Georgia, Moldova, and Montenegro) were engaged in this mission and sent soldiers to the Republic of Mali.

EUTM Mali ended on 17 May 2024, with the participating forces redeploying to Europe the following day.

== Mandates ==
Beginning in 2013, the Council adopted several decisions. According to these documents, EUTM Mali evolved towards its final nature. The most relevant ones were:

- Council Decision 2013/34/CFSP: EUTM Mali creation
- Council Decision 2013/87/CFSP: EUTM Mali mission launching
- Council Decision 2014/220/CFSP: 2nd mandate. EUTM Mali extension until 18 May 2016.
- Council Decision 2016/446/CFSP: 3rd mandate. EUTM Mali extension until 18 May 2018.
- Council Decision (CFSP) 2018/716: 4th mandate. EUTM Mali extension until 18 May 2020.
- Council Decision (CFSP) 2020/434: 5th and last mandate. EUTM Mali extension until 18 May 2024.

== Relationships ==
EUTM Mali had links with EUCAP Sahel Mali, the United Nations Multidimensional Integrated Stabilization Mission in Mali and Operation Barkhane in the north of Mali, with which EUTM shared the same goal, to help Mali to free the north of its territory. Notwithstanding, EUTM Mali's mission was a mission of training and advice. After France, Germany, Belgium (in 2016), Czech Republic became in 2020 the leading nation of this mission.

== EU Mission Force Commander of EUTM Mali ==
Country	Rank	Name	From	Until
France	Brigadier General	François Lecointre	Jan. 2013	Aug. 2013
France	Brigadier General	Bruno Guibert	Aug. 2013	Mar. 2014
France	Brigadier General	Marc André Rudkiewicz	Mar. 2014	Oct. 2014
Spain	Brigadier General	Alfonso García-Vaquero Pradal	Oct. 2014	July 2015
Germany	Brigadier General	Franz Xaver Pfrengle	July 2015	Dec. 2015
Germany	Brigadier General	Werner Albl	Dec. 2015	Jul. 2016
Belgium	Brigadier General	Eric Harvent	July 2016	Dec. 2016
Belgium	Brigadier General	Peter Devogelaere	Dec. 2016	July 2017
Belgium	Brigadier General	Bart Laurent	July 2017	Jan. 2018
Spain	Brigadier General	Enrique Millán Martínez	Jan. 2018	Nov. 2018
Germany	Brigadier General	Peter Mirow	Nov. 2018	June 2019
Austria	Brigadier General	Christian Habersatter	June 2019	Dec. 2019
Portugal	Brigadier General	João Pedro Rato Boga de Oliveira Ribeiro	Dec. 2019	June 2020
Czech Republic	Brigadier General	František Ridzák	Jun. 2020	Jan. 2021
Spain	Brigadier General	Fernando Luis Gracia Herreiz	Jan. 2021	July 2021
Germany	Brigadier General	Jochen Deuer	July 2021	Jan. 2022
Austria	Brigadier General	Christian Riener	Jan. 2022	June 2022
Czech Republic	Brigadier General	Radek Hasala	June 2022	Dec. 2022
Spain	Brigadier General	Santiago Fernandez Ortiz-Repiso	Dec. 2022	May 2024

== See also ==
- Operation Serval
- African-led International Support Mission to Mali
