= European Union Training Mission in Somalia =

Military training mission

- Abbreviation: EUTM Somalia
- Formation: 7 April 2010
- Headquarters: Mogadishu, Somalia
- Head of Mission: Giuseppe Zizzari
- Parent organization: European Union
- Website: https://www.eutmsomalia.eu/

The European Union Training Mission Somalia (EUTM Somalia) is a training mission for the Somali Armed Forces conducted by military officials from European Union States and Non-EU States.

== Operations ==
EUTM Somalia in Uganda logo

On 7 April 2010, the European Union launched a military training mission in Somalia (EUTM Somalia), with a mandate to support the Transitional Federal Government (TFG) and assist in strengthening national institutions.

EUTM Somalia was originally centered on training activities. Due to the political and security situation in Somalia at the time, the mission initially conducted training abroad in Uganda. Its headquarters were temporarily based in Kampala, and training was held at a military camp in Bihanga. On 22 January 2013, the Council of the European Union extended EUTM Somalia's mandate for a third time to March 2015, in the process adding strategic advisory and mentoring activities to the mission's areas of focus.

Since its establishment, EUTM Somalia officials have trained around 3,600 Somali army personnel. In the first few months of 2014, the mission permanently transferred all of its advisory, mentoring and training activities to Somalia, where it now operates a Mentoring Advisory and Training Element (MATE HQ) in Mogadishu.

In February 2014, EUTM Somalia began its first "Train the Trainers" programme at the Jazeera Training Camp in Mogadishu. 60 Somali National Army soldiers that had been previously trained by EUTM would take part in a four-week refresher course on infantry techniques and procedures, including international humanitarian law and military ethics. The training would be conducted by 16 EU trainers. Following the course's completion, the Somali soldiers would be qualified as instructors to then train SNA recruits, with mentoring provided by EUTM Somalia personnel. A team of EUTM Somalia advisors also started offering strategic advice to the Somali Ministry of Defence and General Staff. Additionally, capacity building, advice and specific mentoring with regard to security sector development and training are envisioned for 2014. Its Mandate has been extended eight times, with changes reflecting circumstances on the ground. The 9th Mandate, which began on 1 January 2025 and will end on 28 February 2027, will also contribute to the development of the Somali Navy and Coast Guard.

== Mission ==
EUTM Somalia is partnered with the Somali authorities to a build a professional national military that is accountable to the Somali government. In its 9th Mandate, the EUTM Somalia contributes to building up the Somali Security Forces (SSF) accountable to the Federal Government of Somalia (FGS), in line with Somali needs and priorities, providing strategic level advice to Somali authorities within the Security Institutions in the Mogadishu Area as well as specific mentoring, advice and capacity building in the training domain. Its activities take place within the framework of the European Union's overall presence in Somalia, including political, security and civic engagement.

== Commanders ==
Here is a list of all the commanders of EUTM Somalia from 2010 to 2025:

1. Colonel Ricardo González Elul - 2010 to 2011
2. Colonel Michael Beary - 2011 to 2013
3. Brigadier General Gerald Aherne - 2013 to 2014
4. Brigadier General Massimo Mingiardi - 2014 to 2015
5. Brigadier General Antonio Maggi - 2015 to 2016
6. Brigadier General Maurizio Morena - 2016 to 2017
7. Brigadier General Pietro Addis - 2017 to 2018
8. Brigadier General Matteo Spreafico - 2018 to 2019
9. Brigadier General Antonello De Sio - 2019 to 2020
10. Brigadier General Fabiano Zinzone - 2020 to 2022
11. Brigadier General Antonio Maggi - 2022
12. Brigadier General Roberto Viglietta - 2022 to 2023
13. Brigadier General Fulvio Poli - 2023 to 2024
14. Brigadier General Giuseppe Zizzari- 2024 to present.

== Funding ==
The common funding for EUTM Somalia in 2024 is €15.3 million.

== Partnerships ==
EUTM Somalia works in close cooperation and coordination with other international parties and stakeholders. Among these are the United Nations, the United States Department of State, and the African Union Support and Stabilization Mission in Somalia (AUSSOM).

Additionally, EUTM Somalia has a Support Cell in Brussels and a Liaison Office in Nairobi.

== See also ==
- Operation Atalanta
