= European Union Training Mission in the Central African Republic =

Organization

European Union Training Mission Central African Republic (EUTM-RCA)
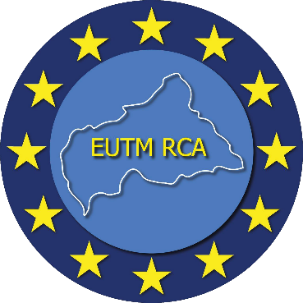
- Commanded by: Brigadier General Irinel Apostolescu Romania
- Date: 19 April 2016–present
- Executed by: Bosnia and Herzegovina; Brazil; France; Georgia; Italy; Lithuania; North Macedonia; Poland; Portugal; Romania; Serbia; Spain; Sweden

The European Union Training Mission in the Central African Republic (EUTM-RCA) is a European Union multinational training mission headquartered in Bangui, Central African Republic.

8 EU member-states (France, Italy, Lithuania, Poland, Portugal, Romania, Spain and Sweden), as well as 5 non-EU countries (Bosnia and Herzegovina, Brazil, Georgia, Serbia and Republic of North Macedonia) have contributed troops to the mission.

EUTM RCA, in its 3rd Mandate, continues relying on three pillars: Strategic Advice, Education and Training. The mission will continue to follow an integrated, flexible, modular and responsive approach whereas Forces Armée Centrafricaine (FACA) activities will be fully integrated in this approach. Application of the Rule of Law, mainly International Humanitarian Law and Human Rights and the main streaming of Gender and Preventing Sexual Violence in Conflict matters is taken into account in the development of all these activities.

== History ==
On 19 January 2015, the European Council adopted Decision 2015/78 on the establishment of the European Union Military Advisory Mission in the Central African Republic (EUMAM CAR), launched in March 2015. This mission, whose mandate was to provide strategic advice to the Central African army1, ended on 16 July 2016.

On 8 October 2015, the President of the Central African Republic requested that the European Union continue its support to the Central African forces in collaboration with the United Nations Multidimensional Integrated Stabilisation Mission in the Central African Republic (UNMISCA).

On 14 March 2016, a crisis management concept for a training mission in CAR was adopted by the council. Finally, the President of the Central African Republic formally invites the Union to deploy EUTM CAR in the country5.

Finally, the Council adopted Decision 2016/610 establishing EUTM RCA on 19 April 2016. This is the third European training mission launched in Africa, after those in Somalia and Mali. Rapidly, due to the proximity of the mandate between the two missions, the first officers - 40 platoon or company officers - were trained in July 2016. The aim of this initial training is to "train the trainers" in order to enable the Central African army to become more autonomous and to renew itself without outside help1. In July 2016, the training of the battalions could not begin because this task was not being carried out by EUMAM CAR.

At the beginning of September 2016, the first company of the Central African Territorial Infantry Battalion begins its training, which ends on 23 December 2016. During this training, around 195 soldiers and officers are trained.

On 7 January 2017, as part of its mandate, a Support and Services Battalion carpentry shop is inaugurated on its camp (BSS camps) close to the EMA.

At the beginning of February 2017, 35 Georgian soldiers arrive to take part in the mission as a "protection force".

On 7 March 2017, one of the soldiers of the mission died of a severe form of malaria after his return to France.

On 30 July 2018, the Council of the European Union extended the mission's mandate for two years, until 19 September 2020. The Council allocated a budget for the common costs of EUTM CAR of approximately €25.4 million for the period from 20 September 2018 to 19 September 2020.

== Mission ==
EUTM RCA's mission is to "make the Central African Armed Forces (FACA) modern, efficient and democratically accountable.

To this end, the military mission provides:

- Strategic advice to the Central African Ministry of Defence, the military and the FACA; by decision of 30 July 2018, strategic advice may also be given to the office of the president. The mission may also advise on civil-military cooperation.
- Teaches officers and non-commissioned officers of the FACA;
- Provides certain training to the armed forces.

In addition, EUTM RCA complements the activity of the EU Delegation in CAR by providing expertise in various fields, including security and the rule of law. It also interacts with MINUSCA to ensure coherence in the reform of the armed forces and the deployment of units.

EUTM RCA is part of a more general EU approach to combining security (EUFOR RCA, EUMAM RCA and EUTM) and development to stabilise peace, a project cell is set up to "identify and implement projects to be financed by the Union, Member States or third countries, which correspond to its objectives and contribute to the implementation of the mandate".

Comprehensive training takes place in the context of Security Sector Reform (SSR). To this end, the missions for the restructuring of Defence are of the order of :

- Strategic advice
- Operational training
- Education

== Mission Force Commanders ==
| Start date | End date | Force Commander | Nation | Notes |
|---|---|---|---|---|
| 19 April 2016 | 14 January 2017 | Major General Éric Hautecloque-Raysz | France | |
| 14 January 2017 | 24 July 2017 | Major General Herman Ruys | Belgium | |
| 24 July 2017 | 11 January 2018 | Major General Fernando Garcia Blazquez | Spain | |
| 11 January 2018 | 8 July 2019 | Brigadier General Hermínio Maio | Portugal | |
| 8 July 2019 | 18 September 2020 | Brigadier General Éric Peltier | France | |
| 18 September 2020 | 11 September 2021 | Brigadier General Paulo Neves de Abreu | Portugal | |
| 11 September 2021 | 3 February 2022 | Brigadier General Jacques Langlade de Montgros | France | |
| 3 February 2022 | 10 October 2022 | Brigadier General Jacky Cabo | Belgium | |
| 10 October 2022 | 7 October 2023 | Brigadier General Lino Gonçalves | Portugal | |
| 7 October 2023 | 28 September 2024 | Brigadier General Cornel Tonea-Bălan | Romania | |
| 28 September 2024 | 01 October 2025 | Brigadier General Nicolae Oros | Romania | |
| 01 October 2025 | 16 September 2026 | Brigadier General Claudiu Mădălin Tamaș | Romania | |
| 16 September 2026 | Present | Brigadier General Irinel Apostolescu | Romania | |

== See also ==
- Common Foreign and Security Policy
- EUFOR RCA
