= European Union Capacity Building Mission in Niger =

EU civilian mission in Niger

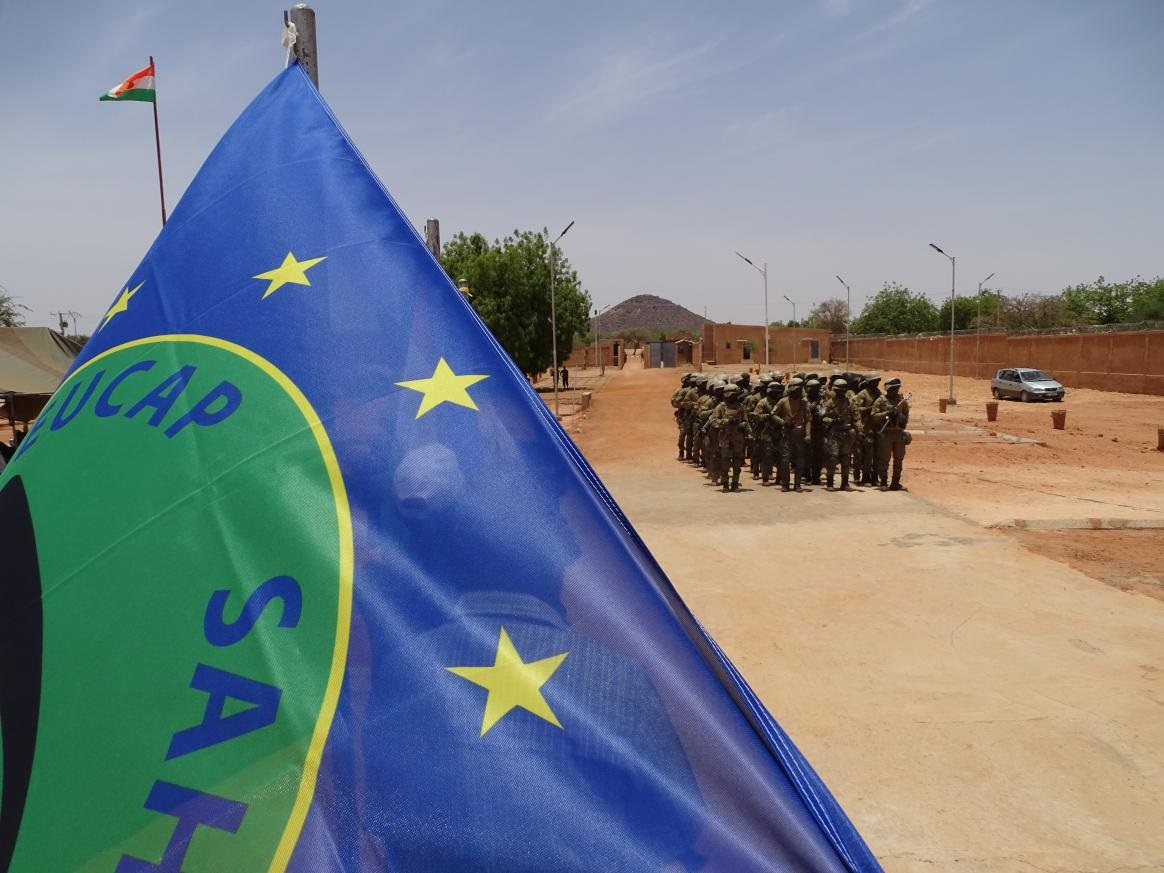
- Abbreviation: EUCAP Sahel Niger
- Formation: 2012
- Dissolved: 30 June 2024
- Headquarters: Niamey, Niger
- Head of Mission: Katja Dominik
- Parent organization: European Union
- Website: https://www.eucap-sahel.eu/

The European Union Capacity Building Mission in Niger (EUCAP Sahel Niger) was a civilian capacity-building mission in Niger, launched by the EU in 2012 under its Common Security and Defence Policy (CSDP). Between 5 June 2023 and 30 June 2024, the German judge Katja Dominik was Chief of Mission.

On 4 December 2023, the Nigerien Ministry of Foreign Affairs announced that the EUCAP Sahel Niger mission would be terminated and that it had six months to leave the country. The European Union's High Representative for Foreign Affairs, Josep Borrell, reacted by saying that the EU "regrets the junta's decision to terminate the agreement establishing the legal basis for the deployment of the EU mission EUCAP Sahel Niger and the military cooperation mission EUMPM" and would "draw the necessary operational consequences". On 27 May 2024, the European Council decided not to extend the European Union military partnership mission in Niger beyond June 30, 2024, due to the current severe political situation in the country. The mission was terminated on 30 June 2024.

== Mandate ==
The mandate of EUCAP Sahel Niger was last extended by the EU until September 2024, but fully ended on 30 June 2024. The Mission was composed of around 130 European experts.

Since its inception in 2012, the Mission has been mandated to train and advise the Nigerien internal security forces, notably the Police Nationale, the Gendarmerie and the Garde Nationale, with a focus on combatting terrorism, organised crime and irregular migration. More specifically, support to the country's internal security forces include the following:

- Support the security forces in improving their interoperability and with establishing common operating strategies.
- Support the security forces in improving their technical competencies, including their human resources, training and logistics management policies.
- Support the security forces in improving their control over migratory flows and irregular migration and their fight against associated criminal activity.
- Support the country with coordinating regional and international efforts on the fight against terrorism and organised crime.

== Concept of Mobile Forces ==
In the summer of 2022, the Steering Committee (COPIL) for EUCAP Sahel Niger decided to reorient the work of the mission. The focus is now on the mobile forces concept, which envisages doubling the current mobile units of police, gendarmerie and national guard to twelve units in the near future. This concept, in whose realisation EUCAP Sahel Niger plays an important coordinating role for the international partners, is an example of a holistic approach involving all actors on the ground.

== History ==
In response to a request from the Nigerien government, the Mission was established by the Council of the EU in July 2012, initially for a two-year period. The request was prompted by growing concerns over terrorism and organised crime in the region. Colonel Francisco Espinosa Navas was appointed to lead EUCAP Sahel Niger for the first year. The mission was last led by German police officer Antje PITTELKAU, who headed the mission from January 2021 to May 2023. Since June 2023, the German judge Katja Dominik was Head of Mission.

The Mission's headquarters was set up in Niamey with two liaison offices in Bamako (Mali) and Nouakchott (Mauritania). Whereas the liaison offices in the neighbouring countries were later closed, a field office was opened in the country's northern town of Agadez in 2016.
