= European Union Capacity Building Mission in Mali =

Peacekeeping force in Mali

Mission to strengthen the capacities of the Internal Security Forces of Mali
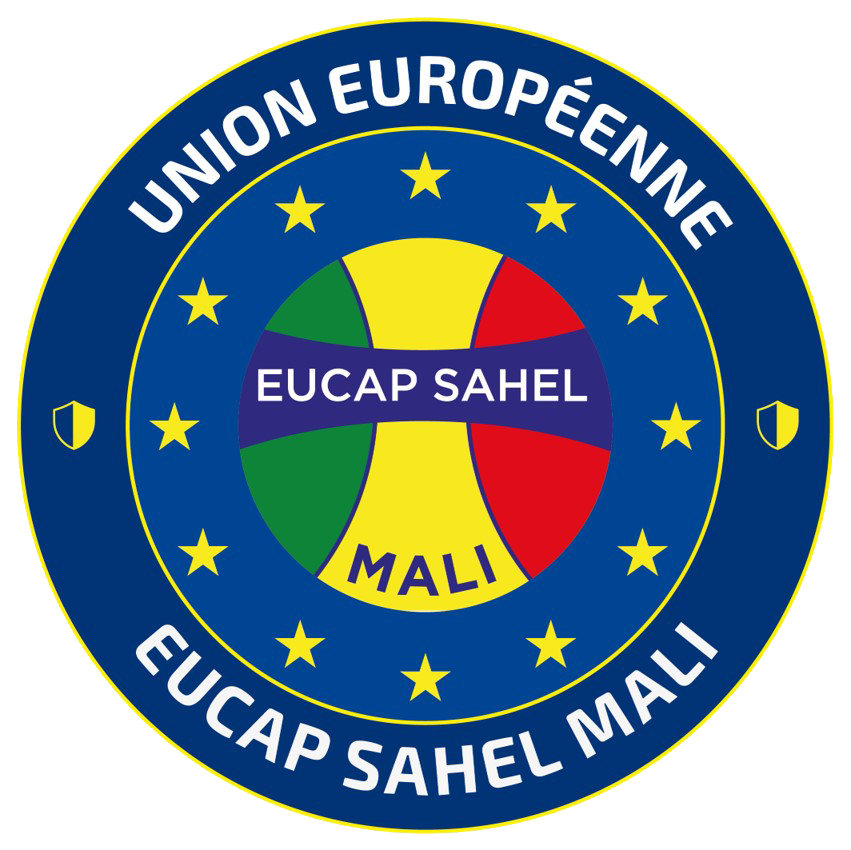

- Abbreviation: EUCAP Sahel Mali
- Formation: 15 April 2014
- Headquarters: Bamako (Mali)
- Head of Mission: Eugene Van Kemenade (The Netherlands)
- Parent organization: European Union
- Budget: Around EUR 60 million (2025-2027)
- Staff: Authorised personnel (118 international and 70 local staff)
- Website: https://eeas.europa.eu/csdp-missions-operations/eucap-sahel-mali_en

EUCAP Sahel Mali is a non-executive European civilian mission in support of the Malian Internal Security Forces (ISF). It is part of the Common Security and Defence Policy (CSDP) of the European Union, and its headquarters are located in Bamako.

In this capacity, the Mission assists and advises the ISF in implementing the Security Sector Reform (SSR), focusing on strengthening their structural and logistical capacities, as well as their collaboration with the population. EUCAP Sahel Mali is committed to promoting respect for human rights and equality between women and men, particularly within the ISF.

== Context ==
EUCAP Sahel Mali was launched on 15 January 2015 at the invitation of the Malian government, with an initial two-year renewable term. This mandate has been extended several times in order to respond to the evolving security context and the changing needs of the Malian authorities.

The mission aims to enable the Malian authorities to restore and maintain constitutional and democratic order, to promote the conditions for lasting peace in Mali, as well as to strengthen the authority and legitimacy of the State throughout the territory, through an effective redeployment of its administration.

== Mandate ==
On 27 January 2025, the mandate of EUCAP Sahel Mali was extended by Decision 2025/166 of the Council of the European Union until 31 January 2027.

In order to support the implementation of the security and justice sector reform, defined by the Government of Mali, the Mission assists and supports building the capacities of ISFs, justice actors and civil society in several areas. These areas include human resources management, the rule of law, integrated border management, the fight against trafficking in human beings, crisis and natural disaster management, and the fight against terrorism and transnational organised crime. The Mission also contributes to the strengthening of the role of the administrative and judicial authorities, with particular attention paid to supporting efforts to prevent corruption and the fight against impunity. Capacity-building and strategic advisory actions, carried out both at the ministerial level and with the ISF structures, are accompanied by the implementation of concrete projects aimed at sustainably supporting the reform of the security and justice sector.

The Mission's projects, which are approved on the basis of the priorities defined in consultation with Malian partners, aim to enhance the logistical resources of the ISF and the justice sector, ensuring they are well-equipped to fulfil their mission and serve the population in the best possible conditions. This is particularly evident in the construction or renovation of infrastructure as well as the supply of equipment.

== Operational priorities ==
On 10 January 2023, Council of the European Union Decision 2023/96 was adopted to support the Mission's structure and activities in the evolving operating environment and the needs of its partners, and in particular to:

- Improving the operational effectiveness of the internal security forces;
- To re-establish the respective hierarchical chains of the internal security forces, ensuring a more coherent management of resources;
- Strengthen the role of administrative and judicial authorities, including by contributing to the prevention of corruption and impunity;
- Facilitate the redeployment of internal security forces to central Mali (conditions permitting), as well as their deployment in southern Mali, with a focus on the National Police;
- Support the redeployment of civilian administrative authorities to central Mali, in accordance with the principles of good governance.

== Coordination with Malian and international partners ==
In order to achieve its objectives, the Mission works closely with the Malian authorities and coordinates its activities with the Delegation of the European Union and other international partners. These include United Nations agencies, funds and programs present in Mali, as well as international organisations and non-governmental organisations. This coordination aims to ensure an integrated and coherent approach to security sector development, thereby contributing to the strengthening of Mali's stability, security and development.

== Organisation ==
Since 13 May 2026 Eugene Van Kemenade serves as the Head of Mission.He is from the Netherlands.

From 11 April 2023 to 10 April 2026, the Head of Mission is a Danish diplomat, Peter Grabow Kolding.

From 15 January 2021 to 31 January 2023, the Head of Mission was Commissaire Général de Police Hervé Flahaut.

From 1 October 2017 to 31 December 2020, the Head of Mission was French Gendarmerie Officer Philippe Rio.

The first Head of Mission was the German diplomat Albrecht Conze.
