= List of members of the European Council =

European political affiliation of the current members of the European Council

The European Council (informally EUCO) is a collegiate body that defines the overall political direction and priorities of the European Union.

Established as an informal summit in 1975, the European Council was formalised as an institution in 2009 upon the commencement of the Treaty of Lisbon. Its current president is António Costa, a former Prime Minister of Portugal.

== Membership ==
The European Council is composed of the heads of state or government of the EU member states, the President of the European Council, and the President of the European Commission.

The representative of each member state depends on its political system. A member of the European Council is usually the highest representative of the executive branch of government. Most member states have parliamentary systems and are represented by their head of government. France, Lithuania, and Romania have semi-presidential systems and are represented by their head of state. Cyprus has a presidential system and is represented by its president, who is both the head of state and the head of government.

== Current members ==
State	Member	Affiliation	Member since	Time as member	Last election	Next election	Share of population (Note: Used for qualified majority voting in the Council.)	Notes
European Union	President of the European Council; António Costa	S&D – PS	1 December 2024	10 years, 116 days (Note: Costa had already been a member of the Council from November 2015 to April 2024 as Prime Minister of Portugal.)	2024	2027	—	Non-voting member
European Union	President of the European Commission; Ursula von der Leyen	EPP – CDU	1 December 2019	6 years, 353 days	2024	2029	—	Non-voting member
Republic of Austria	Chancellor; Christian Stocker	EPP – ÖVP	3 March 2025	1 year, 261 days	2024	2029	1.99%	Head of government
Kingdom of Belgium	Prime Minister; Bart De Wever	ECR – N-VA	3 February 2025	1 year, 289 days	2024	2029	2.58%	Head of government
Republic of Bulgaria	Prime Minister; Rumen Radev	Una. – PB	8 May 2026	195 days	2026	2030	1.55%	Head of government
Republic of Croatia	Prime Minister; Andrej Plenković	EPP – HDZ	19 October 2016	10 years, 31 days	2024	2028	0.90%	Head of government
Republic of Cyprus	President; Nikos Christodoulides	EPP – Ind.	28 February 2023	3 years, 264 days	2023	2028	0.20%	Head of state and head of government
Czech Republic	Prime Minister; Andrej Babiš	PfE – ANO	9 December 2025	4 years, 337 days (Note: Babiš had already been Prime Minister of the Czech Republic, and therefore a member of the Council, from December 2017 to November 2021.)	2025	2029	2.36%	Head of government
Denmark	Prime Minister; Mette Frederiksen	S&D – S	27 June 2019	7 years, 145 days	2026	2030	1.30%	Head of government
Republic of Estonia	Prime Minister; Kristen Michal	Renew – ER	23 July 2024	2 years, 119 days	2023	2027	0.30%	Head of government
Republic of Finland	Prime Minister; Petteri Orpo	EPP – Kok.	20 June 2023	3 years, 152 days	2023	2027	1.24%	Head of government
French Republic	President; Emmanuel Macron	Renew – RE	14 May 2017	9 years, 189 days	2022	2027	15.07%	Head of state
Federal Republic of Germany	Chancellor; Friedrich Merz	EPP – CDU	6 May 2025	1 year, 197 days	2025	2029	18.57%	Head of government
Hellenic Republic	Prime Minister; Kyriakos Mitsotakis	EPP – ND	26 June 2023	7 years, 101 days (Note: Mitsotakis had already been Prime Minister of Greece, and therefore a member of the Council, from July 2019 to May 2023.)	2023	2027	2.39%	Head of government
Hungary	Prime Minister; Péter Magyar	EPP – Tisza	9 May 2026	194 days	2026	2030	2.17%	Head of government
Ireland	Taoiseach; Micheál Martin	Renew – FF	23 January 2025	4 years, 107 days (Note: Martin had already been Taoiseach, and therefore a member of the Council, from June 2020 to December 2022.)	2024	2029	1.12%	Between July and December 2026, Micheál Martin is the head of government of the rotating presidency of the Council of the European Union.
Italian Republic	Prime Minister; Giorgia Meloni	ECR – FdI	22 October 2022	4 years, 28 days	2022	2027	13.38%	Head of government
Republic of Latvia	Prime Minister; Andris Kulbergs	Una. – AS	28 May 2026	175 days	2026	2030	0.42%	Head of government
Republic of Lithuania	President; Gitanas Nausėda	Una. – Ind.	12 July 2019	7 years, 130 days	2024	2029	0.62%	Head of state
Grand Duchy of Luxembourg	Prime Minister; Luc Frieden	EPP – CSV	17 November 2023	3 years, 2 days	2023	2028	0.14%	Head of government
Republic of Malta	Prime Minister; Robert Abela	S&D – PL	13 January 2020	6 years, 310 days	2026	2031	0.12%	Head of government
Netherlands	Prime Minister; Rob Jetten	Renew – D66	23 February 2026	269 days	2025	2029	3.94%	Head of government
Republic of Poland	Prime Minister; Donald Tusk	EPP – KO	13 December 2023	14 years, 285 days (Note: Tusk had already been a member of the Council from November 2007 to September 2014 as Prime Minister of Poland, and from December 2014 to November 2019 as President of the European Council.)	2023	2027	8.45%	Head of government
Portuguese Republic	Prime Minister; Luís Montenegro	EPP – PSD	2 April 2024	2 years, 231 days	2025	2029	2.30%	Head of government
Romania	President; Nicușor Dan	Una. – Ind.	26 May 2025	1 year, 177 days	2025	2030	4.29%	Head of state
Slovak Republic	Prime Minister; Robert Fico	Una. – Smer–SD	25 October 2023	13 years, 16 days (Note: Fico had already been Prime Minister of Slovakia, and therefore a member of the Council, from July 2006 to July 2010 and from April 2012 to March 2018.)	2023	2027	1.22%	Head of government
Republic of Slovenia	Prime Minister; Janez Janša	EPP – SDS	22 May 2026	7 years, 290 days (Note: Janša had already been Prime Minister of Slovenia, and therefore a member of the Council, from December 2004 to November 2008, from February 2012 to March 2013, and from March 2020 to May 2022.)	2026	2030	0.47%	Head of government
Kingdom of Spain	Prime Minister; Pedro Sánchez	S&D – PSOE	2 June 2018	8 years, 170 days	2023	2026	10.59%	Head of government
Kingdom of Sweden	Prime Minister; Ulf Kristersson	EPP – M	18 October 2022	4 years, 32 days	2026	2030	2.32%	Head of government

== Longest-serving members of the European Council ==
Leaders who have been members of the European Council for more than 10 years
#	Member	Position	State	Membership		Last affiliation
1	Jean-Claude Juncker	Prime Minister	Luxembourg	20 January 1995 – 4 December 2013	18 years, 318 days	EPP
1	Jean-Claude Juncker	Commission President	European Union	1 November 2014 – 30 November 2019	5 years, 29 days	EPP
1	Jean-Claude Juncker				23 years, 347 days	EPP
2	Helmut Kohl	Chancellor	Germany (Note: West Germany until 3 October 1990.)	1 October 1982 – 27 October 1998	16 years, 26 days	EPP
3	Angela Merkel	Chancellor	Germany	22 November 2005 – 8 December 2021	16 years, 16 days	EPP
4	Viktor Orbán	Prime Minister	Hungary	29 May 2010 – 9 May 2026	15 years, 345 days	PfE
5	Donald Tusk	Prime Minister	Poland	16 November 2007 – 22 September 2014	6 years, 310 days	EPP
5	Donald Tusk	Council President	European Union	1 December 2014 – 30 November 2019	4 years, 364 days	EPP
5	Donald Tusk	Prime Minister	Poland	13 December 2023 – present	2 years, 341 days	EPP
5	Donald Tusk				14 years, 285 days	EPP
6	Jacques Santer	Prime Minister	Luxembourg	20 July 1984 – 20 January 1995	10 years, 190 days	EPP
6	Jacques Santer	Commission President	European Union	25 January 1995 – 15 March 1999	4 years, 49 days	EPP
6	Jacques Santer				14 years, 238 days	EPP
7	François Mitterrand	President	France	21 May 1981 – 17 May 1995	13 years, 361 days	S&D
8	Mark Rutte	Prime Minister	Netherlands	14 October 2010 – 2 July 2024	13 years, 262 days	Renew
9	Robert Fico	Prime Minister	Slovakia	4 July 2006 – 8 July 2010	4 years, 4 days	Una.
9	Robert Fico	Prime Minister	Slovakia	4 April 2012 – 22 March 2018	5 years, 352 days	Una.
9	Robert Fico	Prime Minister	Slovakia	25 October 2023 – present	3 years, 25 days	Una.
9	Robert Fico				13 years, 16 days	Una.
10	Wilfried Martens	Prime Minister	Belgium	3 March 1979 – 6 April 1981	2 years, 34 days	EPP
10	Wilfried Martens	Prime Minister	Belgium	17 December 1981 – 7 March 1992	10 years, 81 days	EPP
10	Wilfried Martens				12 years, 115 days	EPP
11	José Manuel Barroso	Prime Minister	Portugal	6 April 2002 – 17 July 2004	2 years, 102 days	EPP
11	José Manuel Barroso	Commission President	European Union	22 November 2004 – 31 October 2014	9 years, 343 days	EPP
11	José Manuel Barroso				12 years, 80 days	EPP
12	Jacques Chirac	President	France	17 May 1995 – 16 May 2007	11 years, 364 days	EPP
13	Ruud Lubbers	Prime Minister	Netherlands	4 November 1982 – 22 August 1994	11 years, 291 days	EPP
14	Margaret Thatcher	Prime Minister	United Kingdom	4 May 1979 – 28 November 1990	11 years, 208 days	ECR
15	Bertie Ahern	Taoiseach	Ireland	26 June 1997 – 7 May 2008	10 years, 316 days	ECR
16	Göran Persson	Prime Minister	Sweden	22 March 1996 – 6 October 2006	10 years, 198 days	S&D
17	Poul Schlüter	Prime Minister	Denmark	10 September 1982 – 25 January 1993	10 years, 137 days	EPP
18	Felipe González	Prime Minister	Spain	1 January 1986 – 5 May 1996	10 years, 125 days	S&D
19	António Costa	Prime Minister	Portugal	26 November 2015 – 2 April 2024	8 years, 128 days	S&D
19	António Costa	Council President	European Union	1 December 2024 – present	1 year, 353 days	S&D
19	António Costa				10 years, 116 days	S&D
20	Tony Blair	Prime Minister	United Kingdom	2 May 1997 – 27 June 2007	10 years, 56 days	S&D
21	Klaus Iohannis	President	Romania	21 December 2014 – 12 February 2025	10 years, 53 days	EPP
22	Jacques Delors	Commission President	European Union	7 January 1985 – 24 January 1995	10 years, 17 days	S&D
23	Charles Michel	Prime Minister	Belgium	11 October 2014 – 27 October 2019	5 years, 16 days	Renew
23	Charles Michel	Council President	European Union	1 December 2019 – 30 November 2024	4 years, 365 days	Renew
23	Charles Michel				10 years, 15 days	Renew

== See also ==
- European Council
- European Union
