= Arne Juhl =

Danish brewery worker (born 1960)

Arne Juhl (born 1960) is a Danish former brewery worker who, in connection with the 2019 Danish parliamentary election, became nationally known as the face of the Social Democrats' election promise of early retirement, popularly known as the Arne pension.

== Life ==
Juhl grew up in Southern Jutland and lived in Fjelstrup. He worked for 42 years at the Fuglsang brewery in Haderslev, where he had physically demanding tasks. Before the election campaign, he had suffered a knee injury, highlighted in the campaign as an example of wear and tear after a long working life.

=== 2019 parliamentary election ===
In connection with the 2019 parliamentary election, Juhl was used as a major figure in the Social Democrats' campaign for a new right to early retirement under the slogan "Now it's Arne's turn". He was often mentioned in the media as the party's "poster boy" for the reform and appeared both in campaign material and in press coverage as a representative of skilled workers with long working lives who were not entitled to other options to retire from the labor market with a public benefit. The benefit is therefore also known as the "Arne pension".

=== After the 2019 parliamentary election ===
Between the general election and September, Juhl underwent surgery for lung cancer and received chemotherapy as of September 2019, which led to him taking sick leave from the brewery. Juhl attended the Social Democratic Party congress in Aalborg on 14 September 2019, where Prime Minister and party chair Mette Frederiksen stated, "You agreed to become the face of many people's desire for better pension opportunities. Because you feel the wear and tear and strain on your own body. And because you want a fairer Denmark." In September 2019, he wanted to raise the price of tobacco products. Regarding the agreement on the Arne pension, he said, "It's quite excellent."

On 18 September 2020, Juhl stated that he was proud of his role in the election campaign and the political debate it had sparked.

In 2022, he lost his job when the brewery left Haderslev. In December 2023, he stated that he planned to retire on 1 May 2024. Upon his retirement, he was publicly celebrated, including at an event with Prime Minister Mette Frederiksen. In December 2025, Juhl stated that he was considering no longer voting for the Social Democrats, but instead for Green Left (SF). On his reasons, he commented, "It's the high food prices. Then they reduce the tax on chocolate and sugar instead of halving the VAT on food so that you could get normal prices for the working class." A few days later, he scolded the Liberal Alliance for having "abused" him in several campaigns and stated "Alex Vanopslagh is beyond pedagogical reach in my world. in my world. I can't stand him. He wants to take from the poor and give to the rich" and wished the party to go "where the pepper grows".
