= Fuglsang =

Fuglsang may refer to:

== People ==
- Frederik Fuglsang (1887–1953), Danish cinematographer
- Hans Fuglsang-Damgaard (1890–1979), Danish bishop
- Jakob Fuglsang (born 1985), Danish professional racing cyclist
- Niels Fuglsang (born 1985), Danish politician

== Other ==
- Fuglsang (brewery), a brewery in Haderslev, Denmark
- Fuglsang Manor, a 19th-century manor house and former artist retreat on the island of Lolland, Denmark
- Fuglsang Art Museum, an art museum set in rural surroundings on the island of Lolland, Denmark

== See also ==
- Fuglesang

[
