= Fuglesang =

Fuglesang (also spelled Fugelsang) is a surname. Notable people with the surname include:

- Christer Fuglesang (born 1957), Swedish astronaut and physicist
- John Fugelsang (born 1969), American actor and stand-up comedian
- Nils Fuglesang (1918–1944), Norwegian military officer
- Rolf Jørgen Fuglesang (1909–1988), Norwegian politician
- Signe Horn Fuglesang (born 1938), Norwegian art historian

== See also ==
- Fuglsang (disambiguation)
