= Mette Frederiksen =

Prime Minister of Denmark since 2019

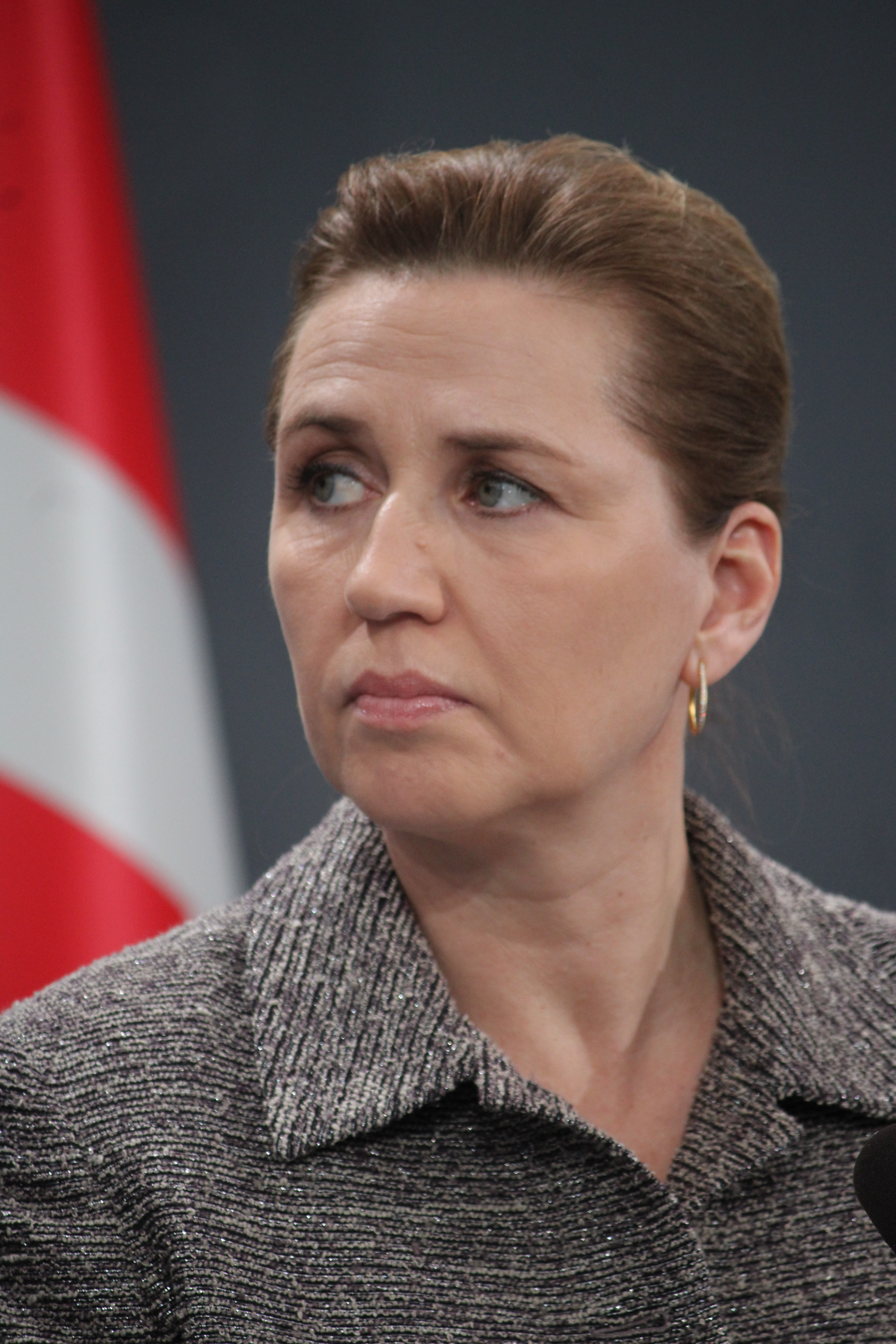
- Frederiksen in 2026

Prime Minister of Denmark
- Incumbent
- Assumed office 27 June 2019
- Monarchs: Margrethe II; Frederik X
- Deputy: Jakob Ellemann-Jensen (2022–2023); Troels Lund Poulsen (2023–2026)
- Preceded by: Lars Løkke Rasmussen

Leader of the Social Democrats
- Incumbent
- Assumed office 28 June 2015
- Deputy: Frank Jensen; Mogens Jensen
- Preceded by: Helle Thorning-Schmidt
Ministerial positions
Minister of Justice
In office 10 October 2014 – 28 June 2015
Prime Minister	Helle Thorning-Schmidt
Preceded by	Karen Hækkerup
Succeeded by	Søren Pind
Minister of Employment
In office 3 October 2011 – 10 October 2014
Prime Minister	Helle Thorning-Schmidt
Preceded by	Inger Støjberg
Succeeded by	Henrik Dam Kristensen

Member of the Folketing
- Incumbent
- Assumed office 20 November 2001
- Constituency: Copenhagen (2001–2007); Greater Copenhagen (2007–2019); North Jutland (2019–present)

Personal details
- Born: 19 November 1977 (age 48) Aalborg, Denmark
- Party: Social Democrats
- Spouses: Erik Harr (m. 2003; div. 2014) Bo Tengberg (m. 2020)
- Children: 2
- Education: Aalborg University (BA); University of Copenhagen (MA)
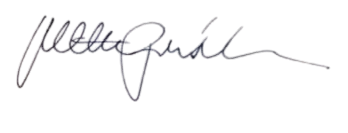
- Signature

Mette Frederiksen K.1 (Danish: [ˈmetə ˈfʁeðˀəʁeksn̩]; born 19 November 1977) is a Danish politician who has served as the prime minister of Denmark since 2019 and the leader of the Social Democrats since 2015. She is the second woman to hold either office following Helle Thorning-Schmidt, and is also the youngest prime minister in Danish history.

Frederiksen worked briefly as a trade unionist before entering politics. Elected to the Folketing in 2001 for Copenhagen County, she became Minister of Employment in 2011 and later Minister of Justice in 2014, in the governments of Helle Thorning-Schmidt. After the Social Democrats' defeat in 2015, she succeeded Thorning-Schmidt as party leader and became Leader of the Opposition.

Frederiksen led the red bloc to a Folketing majority in 2019, becoming prime minister on 27 June. Her first cabinet navigated through the COVID-19 pandemic in Denmark. The Mink Commission criticised government handling of the Cluster 5 outbreak in July 2022, but Frederiksen was cleared of deliberately misleading the public. She called an early election in November 2022, winning the Social Democrats' best result in 20 years and forming a centrist coalition with Venstre and the Moderates.

Domestically, Frederiksen pursued strict immigration policies, combining law-and-order measures with welfare and defence policies. As part of her environmental policy, she passed the Climate Act (70% emissions reduction by 2030) and introduced a tax on agricultural emissions. Social reforms included expanded early retirement, strengthened vocational education, and limits on some master's programmes.

Initially a Eurosceptic, Frederiksen shifted after Russia's invasion of Ukraine, supporting joint EU defence borrowing and leaving the Frugal Four. She has taken a hawkish stance on defence and security, strongly supporting NATO and the United States, and Denmark has become a top economic and military contributor to Ukraine relative to GDP. Under Frederiksen, Denmark increased defence spending to more than 3% of GDP in 2025–2026, extended conscription to women, and abolished its EU defence opt-out. In 2025, Politico ranked her Europe's second most powerful person, and in 2026 she was included on Time's list of the world's 100 most influential people. She has consistently condemned Donald Trump's proposed US acquisition of Greenland; her response to Trump's threats gave Frederiksen and her party a political boost ahead of the 2026 general election, in which her party again placed first.

== Early life ==
Mette Frederiksen was born on 19 November 1977 in Aalborg, located in the North Jutland Region of northern Denmark. Her father, Flemming Frederiksen, worked as a typographer, while her mother, Anette Frederiksen, was a teacher. As a teenager, she campaigned to preserve rainforests, protect whales, and end apartheid. At the age of 12, she joined the international youth wing of the African National Congress. Frederiksen attended Aalborghus Gymnasium, after which she spent a gap year in rural Kenya living with a host family as part of an exchange program. She holds a bachelor's degree in Administration and Social Sciences from Aalborg University, and a master's degree in African Studies from the University of Copenhagen.

== Political career ==
=== Member of Folketing ===
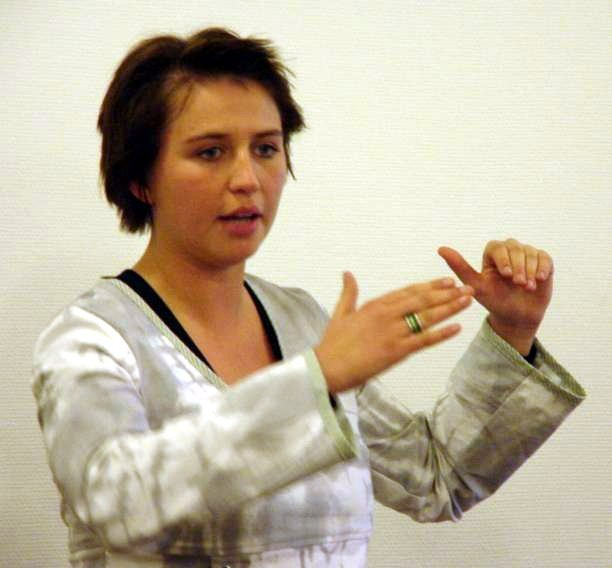
Frederiksen in 2001

Frederiksen worked as a youth consultant for LO, The Danish Confederation of Trade Unions. She was elected as a member of parliament for Copenhagen County in the 2001 Danish general election, which saw the Social Democrats losing first place and placing second for the first time since 1920. After her election, Frederiksen was named as her party's spokesperson for culture, media, and gender equality. In 2002, she received the Nina Bang award for "showing political courage, enthusiasm and impact with social feeling". Frederiksen received the Ting Prize in 2012. She co-authored the books Epostler (2003) and From Fight to Culture (2004).

After the 2005 Danish general election loss, Frederiksen became her party's spokesperson for social affairs. Following the election, she also served as the vice-chairperson of the parliamentary group of the Social Democrats. In the 2007 Danish general election that saw the Social Democrats lose two seats, Frederiksen obtained 27,077 votes, placing her seventh in the ranking of the ten Danish politicians with the most votes.

After the 2011 Danish general election that led to a Social Democrat government, Frederiksen served under Prime Minister Helle Thorning-Schmidt as Minister for Employment from 2011 to 2014 and Minister of Justice from 2014 until she succeeded her as party leader. As Minister of Employment, Frederiksen sought reforms of early retirement pensions, flex jobs, and the employment system. The controversial cash assistance reform meant lower cash benefits for young unemployed and provided cohabiting mutual support, among other things.

=== Leader of the Social Democrats ===
Under Frederiksen's leadership after the 2015 Danish general election in which the Social Democrats returned to power and gained three seats in the Folketing, the party has moved back to the left on economic issues while taking a conservative stance on immigration.

== Prime Minister of Denmark (2019–present) ==
=== 2019 election ===
The 2019 Danish general election saw the Social Democrats gaining a further seat while support for the Danish People's Party and the Liberal Alliance collapsed, costing Lars Løkke Rasmussen his majority. With the result beyond doubt on election night, Rasmussen conceded defeat. Frederiksen was appointed prime minister on 27 June 2019, heading an exclusively Social Democratic minority government supported by the red bloc of the Social Liberal Party, the Red-Green Alliance and the Green Left. Despite having run on an anti-immigration stance during the election, Frederiksen briefly shifted her stance on immigration by allowing more foreign labour and reversing government plans to hold foreign criminals offshore after winning government.

=== 2020 mink cull ===
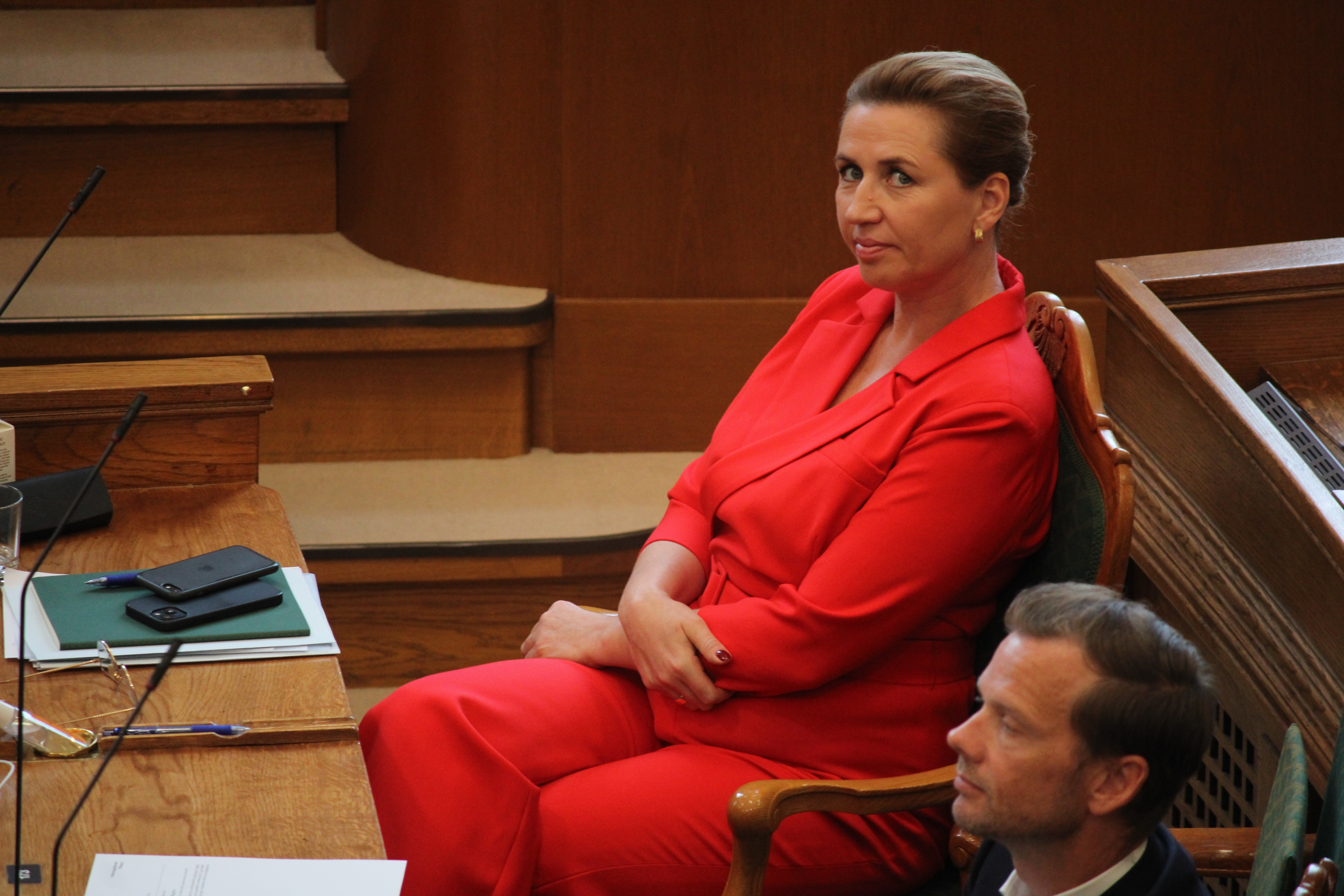
Frederiksen during a hearing on deleted text messages during the cull, 22 October 2025

At a press conference on 4 November 2020, Mette Frederiksen stated that the government had decided that all mink in Denmark should be killed due to the risk of infection with COVID-19. Subsequently, it emerged that this order was illegal and was described by many as being in violation of the Danish Constitution. The government came up with changing explanations and several parties in the Folketing demanded an account of the mink case. The statement was published on 18 November 2020 and it emerged that six ministers had been warned on 1 October 2020 that the order was illegal. Minister of Food, Agriculture and Fisheries Mogens Jensen withdrew immediately. Mette Frederiksen has denied knowledge of the lack of legal basis.

A commission of inquiry was set up to investigate the case, delivered its report on 30 June 2022. The report stated that Frederiksen's statements at the press conference on 4 November 2020 were "objectively grossly misleading", but that she was not aware of the illegality of the order to kill all mink. The Red-Green Alliance and Green Left, both of which are supporting parties of Frederiksen, announced they would not be voting for independent lawyer examination of the report, which could lead to impeachment. Sofie Carsten Nielsen, the leader of the Danish Social Liberal Party, also a supporting party, similarly did not want independent examination but demanded a general election before 4 October 2022. If her demands were not met, she promised to support a motion of no confidence against Frederiksen. Frederiksen later announced on 5 October 2022 that a general election would be held on 1 November 2022.

Frederiksen received an official reprimand from the Folketing on 5 July 2022 for her actions in handling the mink case. The reprimand stated that Frederiksen had "acted highly criticisable". This was given to her by her own government, with her own party, Social Democrats, not stating that she had committed any errors; the opposition did not participate as they considered it inadequate.

=== Early pension ===
In October 2020, the government reached an agreement with the Danish People's Party, the Socialist Party and the Unity List to introduce a new early retirement pension for people who have spent at least 42 years in the labour market. The benefit, also known as the "Arne pension" (after Arne Juhl), had been a key Social Democratic election promise in the campaign for the 2019 election. The benefit was financed by, among others, the introduction of a special tax on the financial sector and savings on municipal employment efforts.

=== 2022 election ===
On 2 July 2022, Sofie Carsten Nielsen, leader of the Social Liberals, one of the supporting parties of the government, encouraged Frederiksen to set an election date before 4 October after the report of the Mink Commission was published, criticising the government's handling of the Cluster 5 outbreak in November 2020. Later the same day, Nielsen announced that she was ready to put forward a motion of no confidence if the prime minister refused to call early elections. On 5 October, Frederiksen announced that general elections were to be held on 1 November, the first to be held on a Tuesday since the 2007 Danish general election.

The 2022 Danish general election was simultaneously the best result for the Social Democrats in more than 20 years and the worst result for Venstre in more than 30 years. Frederiksen, the leader of the red bloc, thanked voters for giving the red bloc a majority; despite winning a slim majority of one seat, she decided to follow her campaign promise and resign in order to seek a new centrist government with parties from both sides of the political spectrum. Following the results, she was congratulated by the prime ministers of Norway and Spain, Jonas Gahr Støre and Pedro Sánchez, both members of her same European political group, the Party of European Socialists.

On 13 December, Mette Frederiksen went to the queen to present her new government, which included the Moderates and Venstre; the first time the Social Democrats and Venstre formed a government together since 1978. Leader of Venstre, Jakob Elleman-Jensen, became deputy prime minister and minister of defence while leader of the Moderates Lars Løkke Rasmussen was made foreign minister. Nine social democrats lost their ministerial positions due to the formation of the new cabinet. Two ministers, both from the Moderates, are not members of the Folketing. This marked the first time since 2007 that a prime minister was reelected into a consecutive term.

=== Foreign policy ===
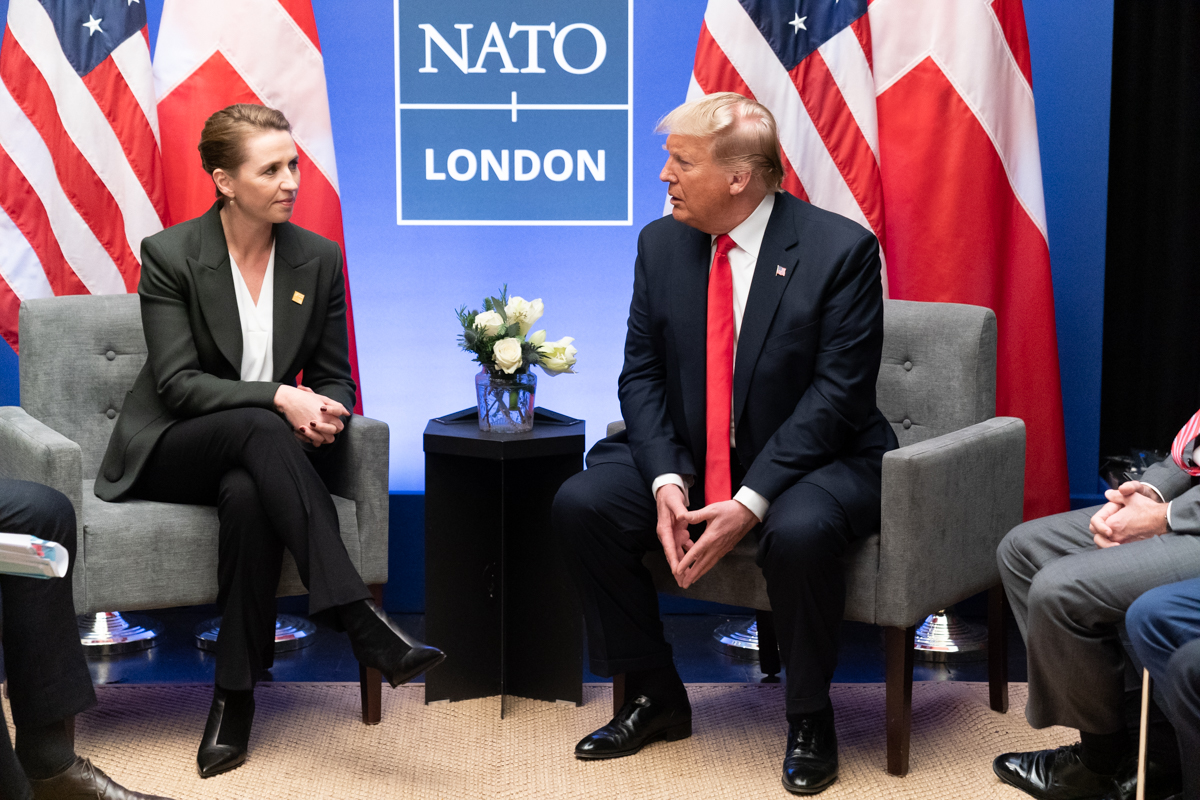
Frederiksen with US President Donald Trump during a NATO meeting in London, United Kingdom, December 2019

Frederiksen gained international attention in August 2019 when U.S. President Donald Trump cancelled a state visit to Denmark following her refusal to sell Greenland, an autonomous territory of the Kingdom of Denmark. On 15 August 2019, The Wall Street Journal reported that Trump had discussed the possibility of buying Greenland with aides. Kim Kielsen, the premier of Greenland, responded by saying that Greenland is not for sale. On 18 August 2019, after the rumor was confirmed by the White House, Frederiksen echoed Kielsen's comments, saying that "Greenland is not Danish. Greenland belongs to Greenland", and called the discussion "absurd". On 20 August 2019, Trump cancelled the state visit, scheduled 2–3 September 2019, with specific reference to Frederiksen's refusal to discuss a possible sale.

On 3 January 2020, Iranian General Qasem Soleimani was assassinated by the United States, which considerably heightened the existing tensions between the two countries. Frederiksen called it "a really serious situation". She avoided the question on whether the killing was right, instead calling for de-escalation. At the request of the United States, Frederiksen initiated diplomatic talks in early 2022 on the possible presence of American troops on Danish soil. Frederiksen expressed enthusiasm for the talks, stating that "We want a stronger American presence in Europe and in Denmark". In June 2022, Frederiksen welcomed Finland and Sweden's applications to join NATO. In December 2023, Frederiksen announced a US-Danish defense cooperation agreement that allows for US soldiers and military equipment to be based at Skrydstrup Air Base, Air Base Karup and Aalborg Air Base.

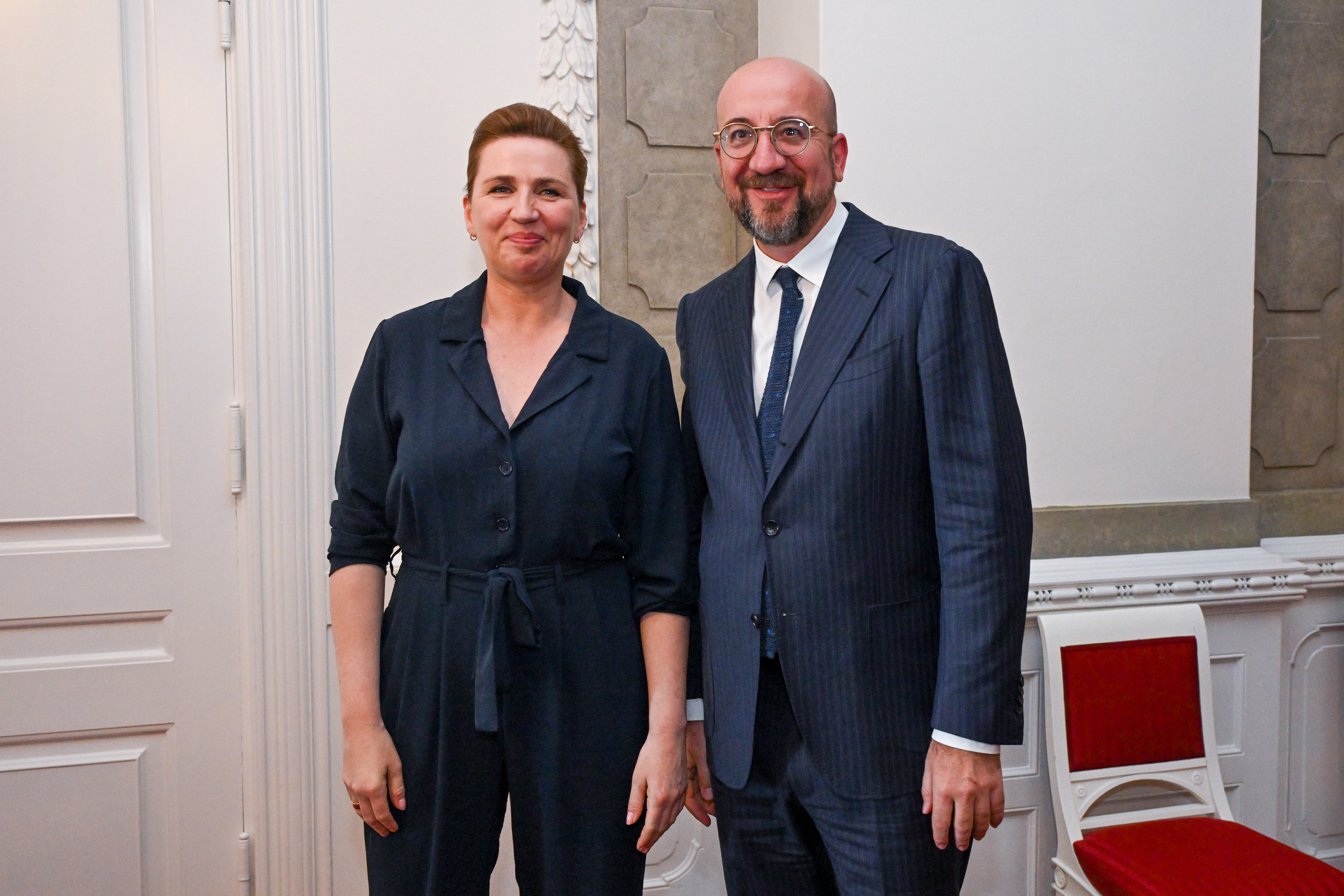
Frederiksen meets with President of the European Council Charles Michel in Copenhagen, 14 May 2024

In June 2024, Frederiksen appeared in Normandy for the eightieth anniversary of the Normandy landings.

==== 2022 Russian invasion of Ukraine ====
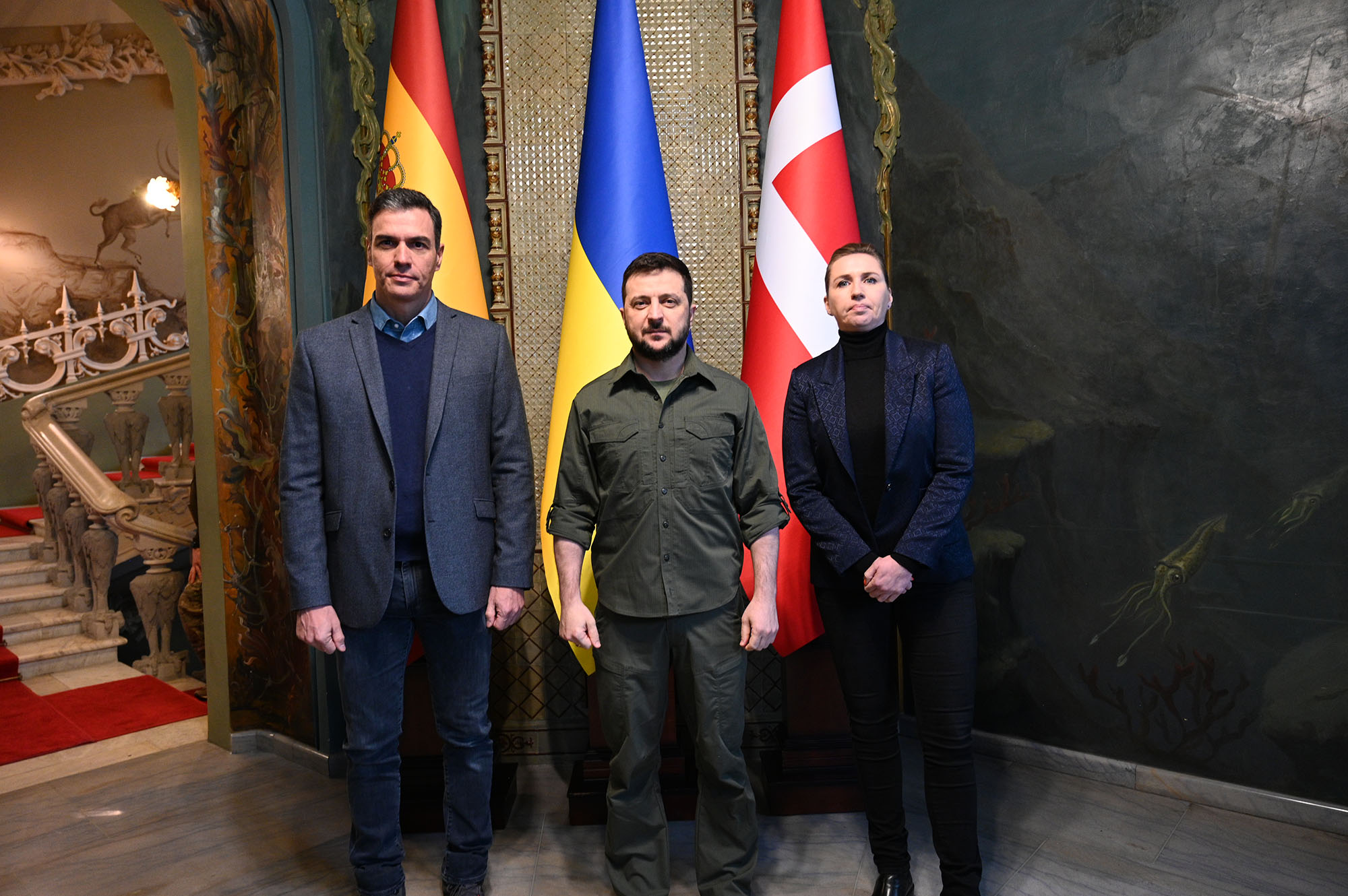
Frederiksen with Spanish Prime Minister Pedro Sánchez and Ukrainian President Volodymyr Zelenskyy in Kyiv, 21 April 2022

Following the 2022 Russian invasion of Ukraine, Frederiksen's government initiated political talks with the five main political parties of the Folketing (Social Liberal Party, Green Left, Venstre, and Conservative People's Party), and presented the "National Compromise on Danish Security Policy" on 4 March 2022, in which a significant increase in Danish defense spending, an emergency allocation of DKK 7 billion for the Danish defense, a plan for independence from Russian gas, and a referendum on the Danish EU defense opt-out were presented. The country will gradually increase defense spending to 2% of GDP by 2033 (as agreed within NATO), which corresponds to an increase in annual defense spending of around 18 billion DKK ($2.65 billion).

On 21 April, together with Spanish Prime Minister Pedro Sánchez, she visited Ukraine's capital Kyiv and President Volodymyr Zelenskyy. At the meeting, Frederiksen promised an increase in arms and military aid to Ukraine by 600 million DKK, bringing the total Danish aid to 1 billion DKK. Denmark has previously sent 2,700 M72 LAW light anti-tank weapons to the Ukrainian army.

On 24 February 2025, Frederiksen expressed skepticism regarding US President Donald Trump's attempts to negotiate a peace deal, stating she did not believe Russian President Vladimir Putin "wants peace in Ukraine." Warning against a premature ceasefire, she remarked: "I understand that many people think that a peaceful solution or a ceasefire sounds like a good idea, but we run the risk that peace in Ukraine is actually [could be – ed.] more dangerous than the war that is going on now."

==== European Union ====
In 2020, Frederiksen was labelled "the most euroskeptic [Danish] Prime Minister in history" by the Danish online newspaper Altinget. Due to the COVID-19 pandemic and the 2022 Russian invasion of Ukraine, however, she "transformed from a skeptic into a strong advocate of [EU] cooperation". Scholars and observers have since identified a marked reorientation in Frederiksen's EU policy.

During the 2022 referendum on the EU defense opt-out, Frederiksen campaigned against maintaining the opt-out. Following the abolition of said opt-out, Frederiksen stated that she had no intentions of seeking the abolition of the remaining opt-outs. She had previously, as justice minister, supported the abolition of the judicial opt-out in the 2015 referendum.

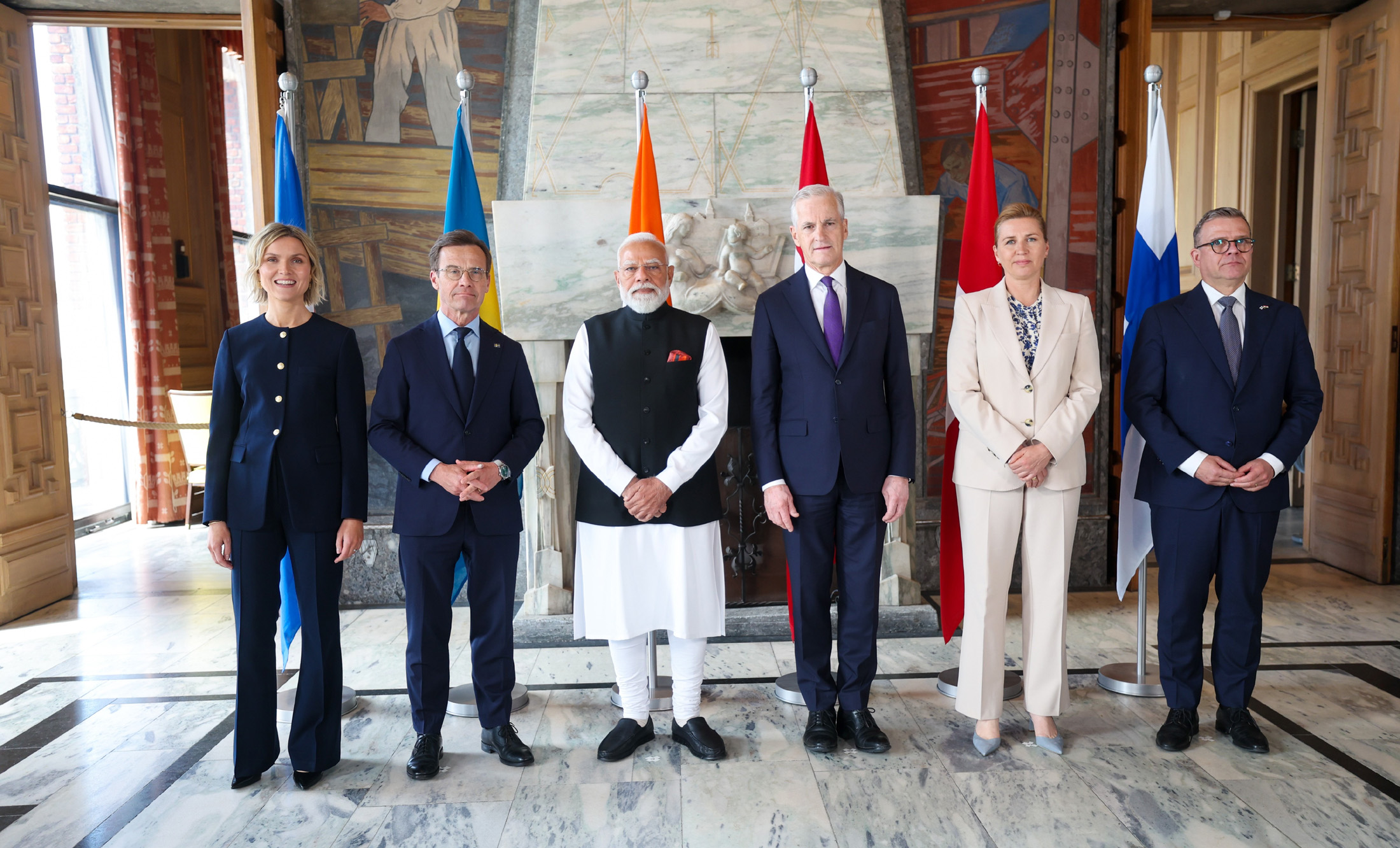
Frederiksen with Indian Prime Minister Narendra Modi and other Nordic leaders during the 3rd India–Nordic Summit in Oslo on 19 May 2026

In late 2024 she dropped Denmark's long-standing objection to EU-level borrowing to help finance common defence procurement, and on 3 June 2025 announced that Denmark would no longer align with the informal "Frugal Four", arguing that rearming Europe must take precedence in EU budget negotiations. While backing joint borrowing for defence-related purposes, Frederiksen has since opposed extending common EU debt more broadly, maintaining a narrower fiscal scope for such instruments. Frederiksen has linked this shift to Europe's deteriorating security environment and has urged accelerated EU action on Ukraine and continental defence.

==== 2022 Nord Stream pipeline sabotage ====
Frederiksen said the 2022 Nord Stream gas leaks were sabotage, while cautioning that it was not an attack on Denmark as they occurred in international waters. Frederiksen travelled to London and Brussels to discuss the leaks with British Prime Minister Liz Truss, President of the European Council Charles Michel and NATO Secretary General Jens Stoltenberg. She also talked with French President Emmanuel Macron over the phone. She reiterated to all she spoke with that there is a need for increased surveillance of critical infrastructure and that they must take Russian President Vladimir Putin's threats seriously.

==== Israel–Palestine policy ====
Following the Hamas-led attacks of 7 October 2023, Frederiksen strongly supported Israel's right to defend itself and maintained Denmark's support for Israel. In 2025, however, she increasingly criticised the Israeli government's conduct of the war in Gaza. In June, she described the humanitarian situation in Gaza as unacceptable and said that "a line has been crossed", while calling for unrestricted humanitarian aid and saying that Denmark was working within the EU on possible sanctions against Israel.

In August 2025, Frederiksen described Israeli Prime Minister Benjamin Netanyahu as "a problem in himself" and stated that the Israeli government had gone "too far". As Denmark then held the rotating presidency of the Council of the European Union, she said that Denmark would seek to increase European pressure on Israel and was open to considering political pressure and sanctions against settlers, ministers, or Israel as a whole. At the same time, she reiterated her support for Israel and Denmark's longstanding position in favour of Israel's security. She also opposed immediate recognition of a Palestinian state, arguing that the conditions for recognition had not yet been met and that recognition should contribute to a viable two-state solution.

=== Military spending ===
In May 2023, her government decided to triple Denmark's military spending over the next 10 years. This spending will be partly financed by the abolition of a public holiday for employees. In February 2025, she said that Denmark would increase defense spending to more than 3% of GDP within the next two years. In March 2025, Germany changed its constitution to allow it to spend up to a €1 trillion on defense, security, infrastructure, and green energy over the next decade. Frederiksen called it "fantastic news for all Europeans".

=== Response to the COVID-19 pandemic (2020–2021) ===
Frederiksen led the Danish Government response to the COVID-19 pandemic. In 2020, she issued an order to mink farmers to cull millions of these animals in the wake of the COVID-19 pandemic; this decision later turned out to be unconstitutional. In 2021, Danish Prime Minister Frederiksen joined forces with Austrian Chancellor Sebastian Kurz and Israeli Prime Minister Benjamin Netanyahu in setting up a joint research and development fund, and possibly production facilities for COVID-19 vaccines, to ensure they had long-term supplies for booster shots or to contend with new virus strains.

=== Education reform ===
In June 2021, Frederiksen's government announced a new model of distributing gymnasium applicants. The model aims to solve the issue of ethnic and economic disparity and "parallel society tendencies" between gymnasiums by considering parent income. Heavy criticism was directed at the suggestion by the blue bloc, who called it "forced distribution". A petition for scrapping the law gained over 50000 signatures, allowing it to be presented before the Folketing.

In June 2022, Frederiksen and her government announced their intention to introduce a ceiling to the entry quotient (Note: The entry quotient is the minimum grade average (as achieved in the gymnasium) to be guaranteed a spot at a higher education institution.) of higher education. Education offers with a higher entry quotient than the proposed ceiling of 10 (Note: The Danish grading scale goes, from least to highest, −3, 00, 02, 4, 7, 10, 12. See Academic grading in Denmark.) would have to offer admission through other means, such as a subject-specific admission test. The goal of the ceiling is to lessen the pressure on students by reducing the need for high grades, and to allow students greater freedom in selecting education.

In September 2022, Frederiksen proposed that approximately half of all Master's degrees would be shortened from two years to one year. This would mostly affect degrees in the social sciences and humanities, with natural sciences and medicine being left mostly untouched. The proposal was met with harsh criticism from students, academics, rectors and parts of the business world, claiming it would negatively affect the quality of education and require the learning of two years material in one year. Frederiksen denied this, claiming the quality of education was to increase and that workers could be trained on the job.

=== Greenland ===
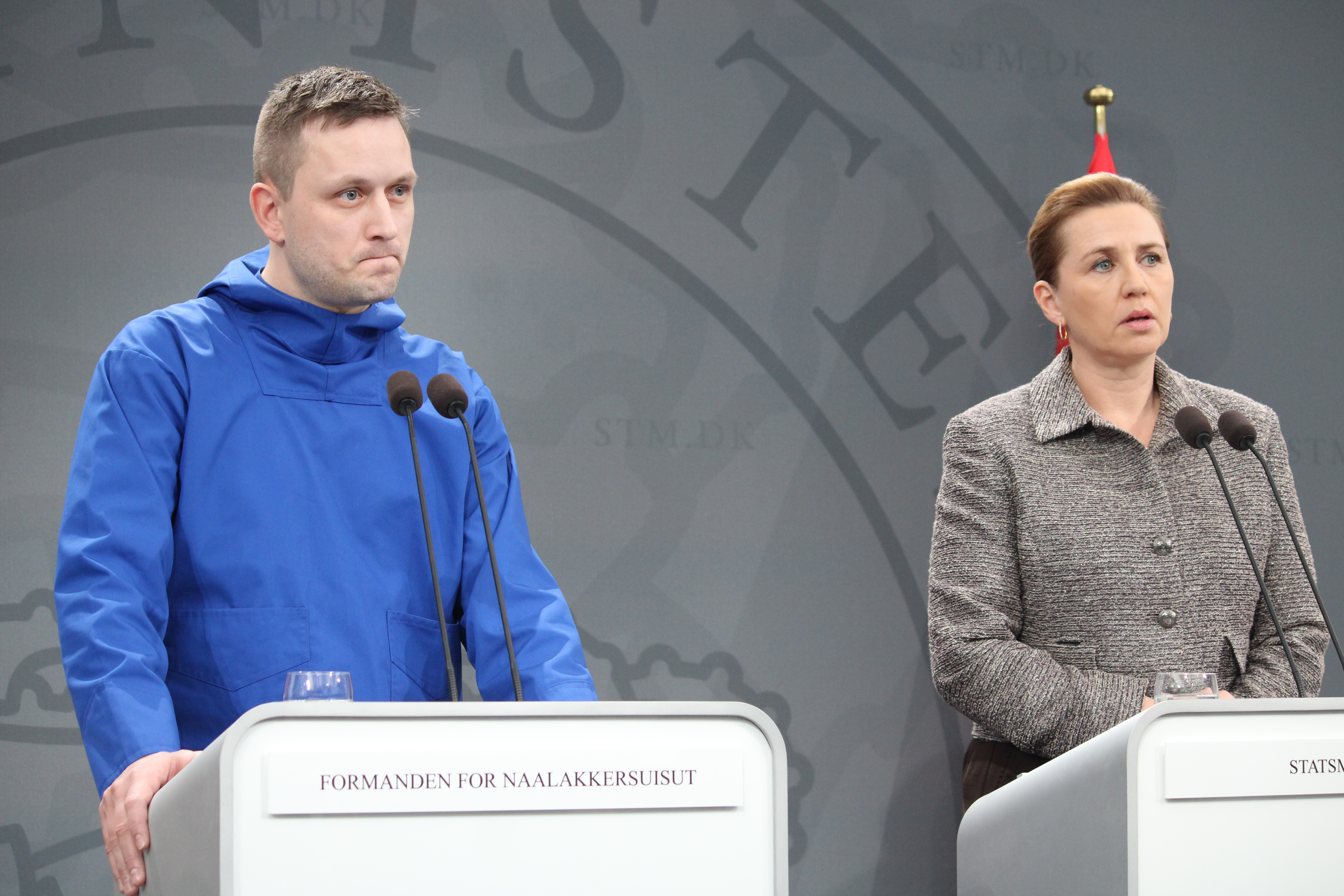
Frederiksen at a press conference with Jens-Frederik Nielsen, 13 January 2026

On 27 August 2025, Frederiksen, along with Greenland's prime minister Jens-Frederik Nielsen, issued an official apology on behalf of the Danish and Greenlandic governments for historic abuses against Greenlandic women, including forced contraception. Frederiksen condemned US hybrid warfare against Greenland under Donald Trump. She reminded Trump that an attack on the Kingdom of Denmark is an attack on NATO and that all NATO members are obligated to come to Denmark's defense, stating that "the Kingdom of Denmark – and thus Greenland – is a member of NATO and is therefore covered by the Alliance's collective security guarantee ... I ... strongly urge the United States to cease its threats against a historically close ally."

In September 2026, under pressure from the United States, Denmark signs a new security agreement with the United States, providing for the construction of two new military bases in Greenland and the modernization of the existing one. In addition, Washington will have oversight over foreign investments, and countries that are not pro-American will be barred from investing in economic projects. In exchange, the United States agrees to renounce any invasion of the territory.

=== 2026 election ===
On 24 March 2026, Frederiksen called a snap general election. Her Social Democrats won 21.9% of the vote and 38 seats in the 179-seat Folketing, their worst result since 1903, down 50 seats compared to 2022. The left-leaning bloc won 84 seats and the right-leaning bloc 77, leaving neither side able to form a majority government.

On 25 March 2026, Frederiksen submitted her government's resignation to King Frederik X at Amalienborg Palace, while remaining as caretaker prime minister. The king subsequently tasked her with leading coalition negotiations.

Frederiksen's coalition talks collapsed in May 2026 after the centrist Moderate Party withdrew from negotiations. King Frederik then asked Troels Lund Poulsen of Venstre to explore a centre-right alternative on 8 May 2026. Those talks also failed, and the king returned the mandate to Frederiksen later in May 2026. On 1 June 2026, she announced that she would form a new government with herself as Prime Minister, consisting of her own Social Democrats, the Socialist People's Party, the Moderates, and the Social Liberals.

== Political positions ==
=== Social policies ===
Frederiksen has stated a desire to be "Prime Minister of Children", and in 2021, she presented a plan called "Law of Children", aiming to put children first in social cases, including giving municipalities more resources to take children away from violent parents, and to give children more rights in divorce cases. In 2020, she also made a deal with the Socialist People's Party, the Red-Green Alliance, and the Danish People's Party, in order to give people who have worked for long the ability to get early retirement. This was also one of Frederiksen's main promises during the 2019 election campaign.

Frederiksen is a vocal opponent of prostitution because she considers it violence against women. For many years, she has strongly advocated for the prohibition of the purchase of sex, as in Sweden, Norway, and Iceland. In 2002, she opened the debate on the abolition of prostitution, and was behind the 2009 congressional decision that the Social Democrats would "work for a ban on the purchase of sexual acts", saying that prostitution caused mental health damage to the prostitute.

=== Immigration ===
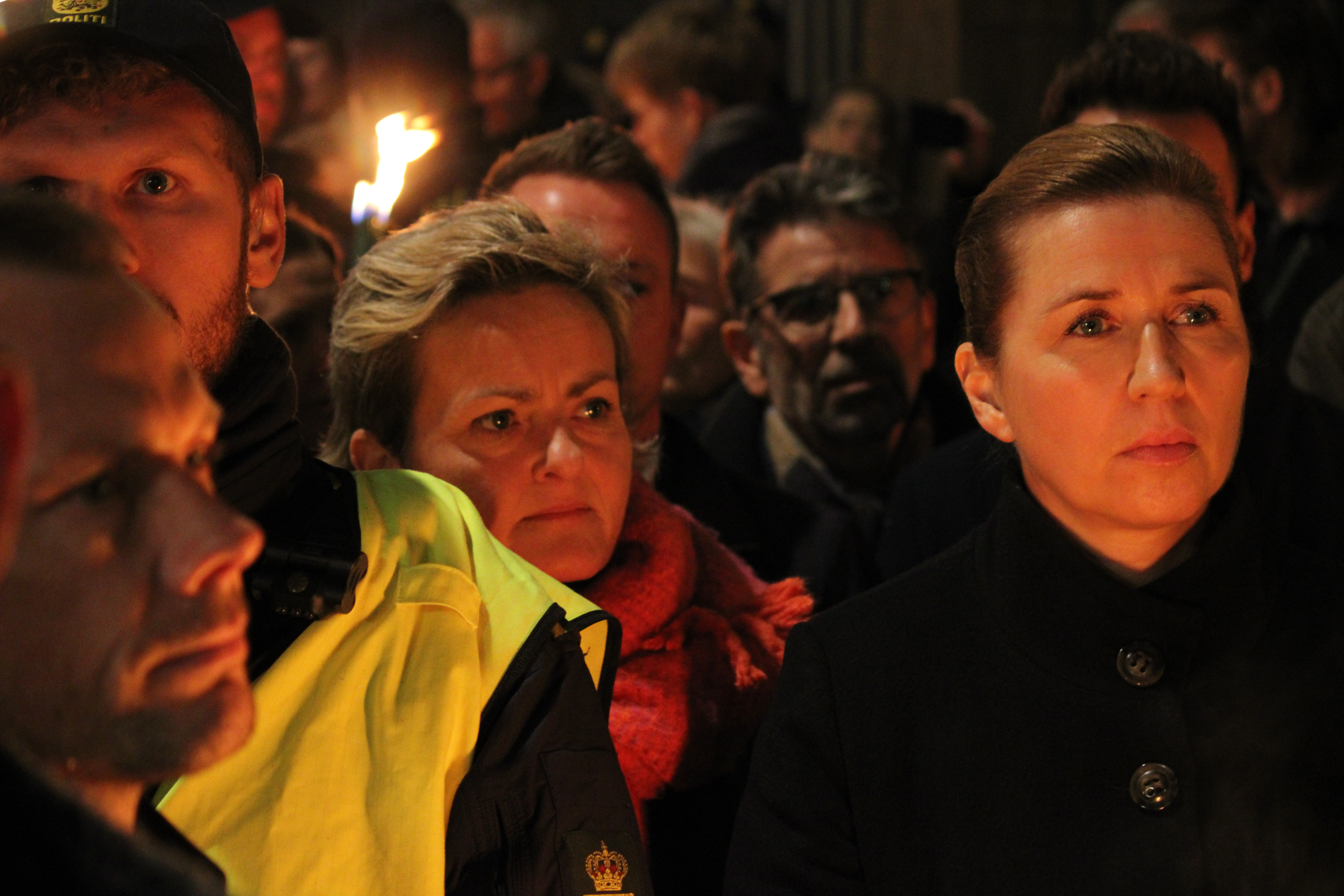
Frederiksen participating in the annual Kristallnacht remembrance event at the Copenhagen Synagogue on Krystalgade, 9 November 2025

Frederiksen became increasingly sceptical of mass immigration, as she believes it has had negative impacts for much of the population, a more pressing issue since at least 2001 after the September 11 attacks which intensified during the 2015 European migrant crisis. In a biography, Frederiksen stated: "For me, it is becoming increasingly clear that the price of unregulated globalization, mass immigration, and the free movement of labour is paid for by the lower classes."

Under Frederiksen, the Social Democrats voted in favour of a law allowing Danish authorities to confiscate money, jewellery, and other valuable items from refugees crossing the border. The bill received harsh condemnation from the United Nations Human Rights Council, and widespread comparisons between the plan and the treatment of Jews in Nazi-occupied Europe. The Social Democrats voted for a law banning the wearing of burqas and niqābs, while abstaining during a vote on a law on mandatory handshakes, irrespective of religious sentiment, at citizenship ceremonies and on a plan to house criminal asylum seekers on a bridgeless island on which they would have to stay at night. Frederiksen also backed the right-wing populist Danish People's Party in their paradigm shift push to make repatriation, rather than integration, the goal of asylum policy. She has called for a cap on non-Western immigrants, expulsion of asylum seekers to a reception centre in North Africa, and forced 37-hours-per-week labour for immigrants in exchange for benefits.

Her government in 2020 and 2021 refused to repatriate children with Danish citizenship from Syrian refugee camps in Kurdish-controlled Syria, due to their parents having joined the Islamic State. A medical report released in April 2022 revealed that many of the children were undernourished and that one 4-year-old needed hospitalization. This led to her government preparing to evacuate the children on the condition that their parents do not come with them, which led to criticism, notably from her supporting parties, the Social Liberal Party and the Green Left.

Frederiksen has referred to Islam as a "barrier to integration", arguing that some Muslims "do not respect the Danish judicial system", that some Muslim women refuse to work for religious reasons, and that Muslim girls are subject to "massive social control", and has called for Muslim schools to be closed. In April 2021, Frederiksen announced that Denmark's "ultimate goal" shall henceforth be one of "zero spontaneous asylum seekers". Danish Integration Minister Mattias Tesfaye added that "no exceptions will be made" towards that goal. The Danish state subsequently ceased the renewal of temporary residency permits to about 189 Syrian refugees, claiming that it is "now safe to return to Syria". She is quoted as saying that Europe had "underestimated" the challenges of mass migration and that “Economic policy and foreign policy in Europe have been too liberal."

Despite having adopted new stricter migration policies than earlier Social Democratic governments, Frederiksen and her government introduced a few relaxations of Danish immigration policies. In 2023, she also promised indefinite support for Ukrainian refugees. Although Frederiksen and her government are against the idea of sudden asylum seekers, they are supporters of the UN refugee quota system and reintroduced Denmark's participation in that system. In January 2024, she disavowed the granting of a Danish residence permit to Lucky Francis, a Nigerian pirate captured during a 2021 Danish counter-piracy operation in Africa. Under her leadership, the Social Democrats justified the strict migration policy as a defence of Denmark's strong welfare state, with the 2026 party programme stating that "we must distinguish between those who can and want to (belong to) Denmark, and those who do not." Critics suggested that while this may have helped to slow down the far-right, it came at a high cost.

In July 2026, in response to the migration crisis in Ceuta, Frederiksen supported Italian Prime Minister Giorgia Meloni's calls for measures against Spain, stating that the EU should "immediately take all necessary measures and consider all options, including a suspension of Schengen cooperation." She added that "uncontrolled immigration poses a threat to Europe and to Denmark."

=== Globalisation ===
Frederiksen has argued that the perception of the Social Democrats adopting the Third Way and practicing centrist and neoliberal economics and supporting unrestricted globalisation contributed to the party's poor electoral performance in the early 21st century. Labeling economic foreign policies of Europe as too liberal, Frederiksen has criticised other social democratic parties for losing their voters' trust by failing to prevent globalisation's chipping away of labour rights, increasing inequality and uncontrolled immigration.

=== Climate change ===
Frederiksen's government made international news with the agreement to reduce Denmark's territorial emissions by 70% in 2030 compared to 1990, the decision to stop oil and gas exploration after 2050, also driven by the fact that only one company applied for a lease in the latest auction, and the energy islands in the North Sea. Frederiksen publicly said: "I was a social democrat before I got green. And when I wake up in the morning, I am still a social democrat before I am green." By March 2021, more than a year after having set an ambitious reduction target for the decade, there were no concrete plans for dealing with the remaining two-thirds of the needed reductions to achieve the Danish 2030 emission target. Green NGOs largely viewed Frederiksen's Minister of Climate Dan Jørgensen's tenure negatively in 2020.

Frederiksen's government has described its climate action strategy as a "hockey stick" model. This means it plans to await new technologies and falling costs and thus only achieve most reductions at the end of the decade. This strategy has been described by the other political parties as a "Bjørn Lomborg" dream. Despite pleas from the UNFCCC, the International Monetary Fund, the World Bank, the Danish economic councils, and the Danish Council on Climate Change, Frederiksen's government has postponed the implementation of a higher carbon pricing mechanism, even though Denmark was a pioneer with its adoption in 1992. The opposition to higher carbon taxes was positively received by associations representing the major emitting sectors such as the Confederation of Danish Industry, as well as the Danish Agriculture and Food Council.

As of March 2021, Denmark stands to have a much lower price on carbon than its neighbours in 2030, with consequences such as trucks from Germany waiting to refuel until they are in Denmark to benefit from the low diesel prices in Denmark. Denmark is also one of the four EU countries without carbon taxes on passenger flights. In fact, Frederiksen's government had plans to guarantee domestic flights during the COVID-19 pandemic by subsidising domestic flights, a decision decried by green NGOs and the supporting parties: Red-Green Alliance and Socialist People's Party. The decision was not implemented as the European Commission would not approve of it due to regulations on state aid.

Frederiksen's government entered a formal agreement with the cement manufacturer Aalborg Portland (Denmark's largest carbon emitter standing for 4% of the national emissions) concluding that they did not have to reduce their annual emissions below their 1990 level of 1.54 million CO_{2} tons. Previously, Mette Frederiksen had said: "I will chain myself to Portland before anyone is allowed to close them". Similarly, her government has been criticised, for example, for allowing state-owned companies to continue the build-out of fossil fuel infrastructure like a natural gas pipeline of 115 km, with an associated socio-economic cost of $113 million for Denmark. In a formal answer to Parliament, the Minister of Climate Dan Jørgensen confirmed that the gas pipeline would not reduce the carbon emissions in the short term nor add any jobs in Denmark. As stipulated in the Climate Act, the Danish Council on Climate Change has to make annual recommendations for and provide a status update on the Danish government's climate efforts. In February 2021, the Danish Council on Climate found it was not likely that Frederiksen's government would achieve their original target of a 70% reduction of greenhouse gases by 2030.

== Controversies and criticism ==
=== Private school case ===
In May 2010, it was revealed that Frederiksen's daughter, along with the children of several other prominent Social Democrat politicians, was being educated at a private school. Along with her colleagues, Frederiksen was accused of hypocrisy by the Danish press as her party had long seen the promotion of public education as a key policy. In 2005, Frederiksen had openly criticised parents who sent their children to private schools. Frederiksen responded to the criticism by saying that her opinion on private education had become more nuanced since her remarks in 2005 and that it would have been hypocritical of her to put her own political career ahead of her daughter's best interest.

=== Unemployment benefit case ===
On 14 March 2013, Ekstra Bladet announced that she and her ministry had failed to inform the Folketing about the correct figures regarding how many unemployment benefit recipients would drop out of the unemployment benefit system in 2013. According to Ekstra Bladet, on 5 December 2012, the Ministry of Employment had new figures for how many people were expected to lose the right to unemployment benefits on 1 January 2013 and the following six months. The number was 22,679 people and thus significantly higher than the 7–12,000 people that the government had announced. She was strongly criticised for this – and both the Unity List and the Danish People's Party subsequently called her in consultation on the matter.

The new unemployment benefit rules were adopted in 2010 by the VK government and the Danish People's Party, and were to be fully implemented on 2 July 2012. The changes mean that the unemployment benefit period is shortened from 4 to 2 years. In the Finance Act agreement for 2012, it was agreed to extend the unemployment benefit period by up to half a year for all insured unemployed who exhausted the unemployment benefit entitlement in the second half of 2012. Therefore, it was not until 1 January 2013 that many began to lose their unemployment benefit entitlement.

== Public image ==
=== International perceptions ===
Frederiksen has often been portrayed abroad as one of Europe's most consequential center-left leaders of the 2020s, particularly regarding security, migration and Arctic affairs. She has been described as one of Europe's "most experienced leaders". In 2023, Reuters and Politico reported that she had emerged as a strong contender for the post of NATO secretary-general, with diplomats describing her as a serious candidate and as a staunch supporter of Ukraine. In Politico's 2025 list of Europe's most powerful people, she was ranked number 2 (following Donald Trump) and described as "The North Star". The magazine wrote that she had become one of the continent's most pragmatic operators and an unofficial spokesperson for European defense independence. Time included her in the 2026 TIME100 list of the world's most influential people. Since December 2021, Frederiksen has been the longest-serving female head of government in the European Union, and she is the third-longest head of government in the EU overall. Globally, she ranks as the second longest-serving incumbent female head of government, following Prime Minister Mia Mottley of Barbados.

International reporting has also focused on Frederiksen's tough migration and refugee policy. In 2025, Politico wrote that she had acquired a reputation as the "black sheep" of European social democrats for siding with the right on asylum and border controls. The same outlet argued that Denmark's "detain-and-deport" approach had influenced debates elsewhere in Europe, and reported that Frederiksen herself defended lower migration inflows and stronger external borders during Denmark's EU Council presidency. Critics have described Frederiksen's migration line as inhumane and as evidence of ideological drift to the right that complicated her standing with parts of the Danish and European left. In 2026, Reuters similarly wrote that although her asylum reforms had helped curb the Danish far right, they had also alienated some allies abroad.

During the 2025–2026 dispute over Greenland, Reuters reported that Frederiksen told U.S. President-elect Donald Trump that Greenland's future was for Greenland itself to decide, while also stressing Arctic security. Associated Press later described French President Emmanuel Macron's June 2025 visit to Greenland with Frederiksen as a sign of European unity, and quoted Frederiksen as calling it "yet another concrete testament to European unity". In 2026, Reuters wrote that her defiant handling of renewed U.S. pressure over Greenland and her efforts to rally European leaders against annexation threats had further raised her international profile. In a 2026 profile of her, Time said that the "Iron Lady" label had been applied to Frederiksen and praised her as "unyieldingly composed" during Trump's threats, linking that image to higher military spending, expanded conscription, and her calls for a more self-reliant European defense. At the same time, some domestic critics portrayed her governing style as overly hard-edged or excessively power-conscious.

== Personal life ==
Frederiksen has two children from her first marriage. On 15 July 2020, Frederiksen married her longtime boyfriend Bo Tengberg, a film director. They were married at the Magleby Church, an affiliate of the Church of Denmark on the island of Møn. Frederiksen has said that she is a non-religious person, but that she enjoys attending church for its cultural value in Danish life.

=== 2024 attack ===
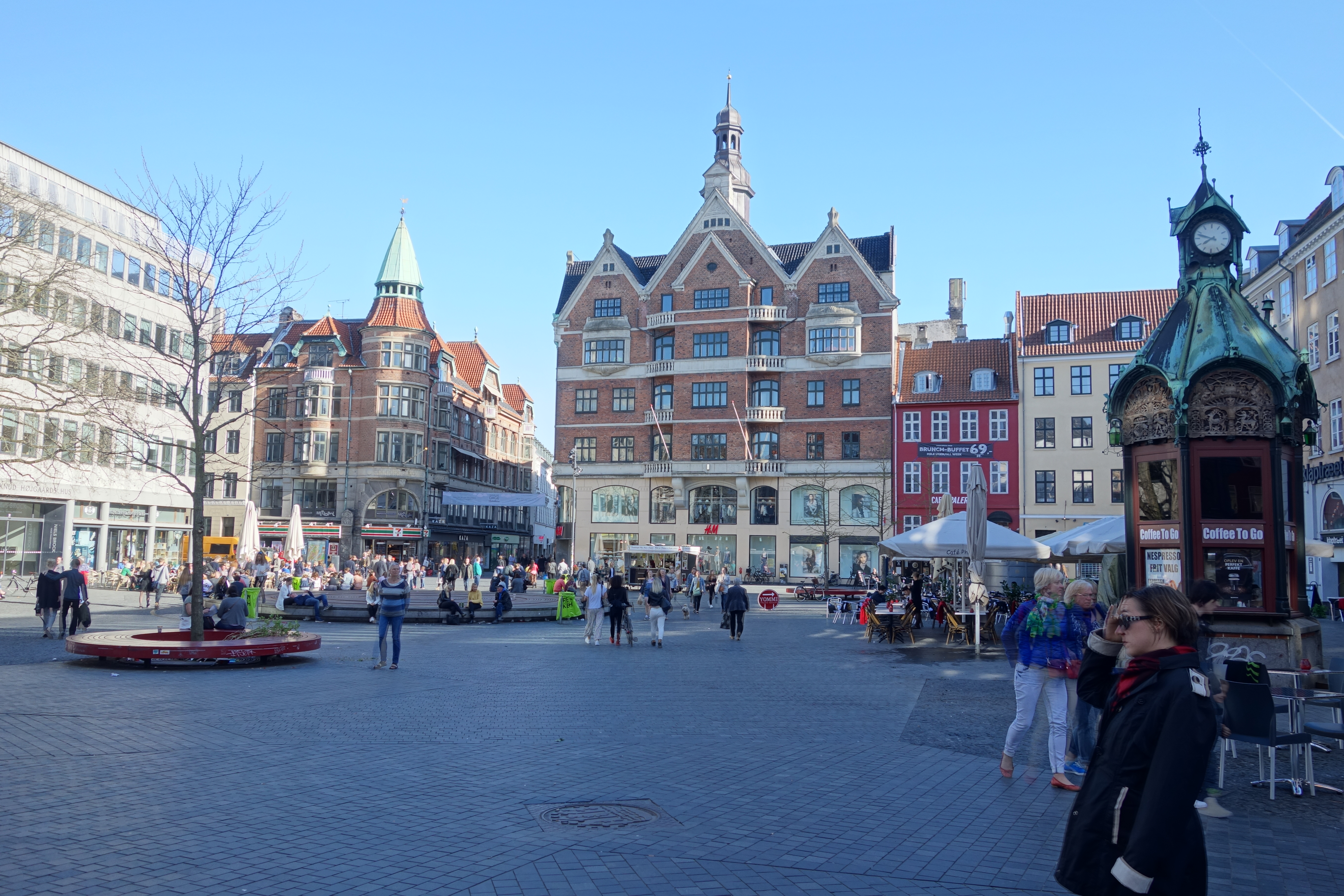
Kultorvet in 2016

A man assaulted Frederiksen in the Kultorvet public square in central Copenhagen on 7 June 2024, two days before the 2024 European Parliament election in Denmark. This was one of several instances of political violence leading up to the elections: in May, Slovak prime minister Robert Fico was shot several times. Bystanders said that she was roughly shoved, causing her to fall sideways, though she did not hit the ground. A 39-year-old man from Poland was identified as a suspect and ordered to appear in court, although he denied the charges.

Frederiksen was taken to Rigshospitalet, and the Prime Minister's Office later released a statement from an orthopedic attending physician, which stated that Frederiksen had suffered a "contusion (to the) right shoulder and minor distortion [of] cervical vertebrae (whiplash)", but was otherwise in good condition. Police said that the suspect was a Polish national and that there appeared to be no political motive for the attack. Days later, she said that she was still shaken by the incident, but said she believed it was "the prime minister who got hit", differentiating it from an attack on her personally.

Environment minister Magnus Heunicke wrote on X that the attack "shakes all of us who are close to her". European Council president Charles Michel stated he was "outraged". Ursula von der Leyen, president of the European Commission, called the attack "despicable". On 7 August 2024, Frederiksen's attacker was convicted by the Copenhagen District Court and sentenced to four months imprisonment, deportation and a ban from entering Denmark for six years following his release.

== Honours and awards ==
- Ukraine: First Class of the Order of Princess Olga (27 January 2023) — for a significant personal contribution to strengthening interstate cooperation, supporting the independence and territorial integrity of Ukraine;
- Ukraine: Member of the Order of Liberty (10 June 2024) — for outstanding personal merits in strengthening Ukrainian-Danish interstate cooperation, support of state sovereignty and territorial integrity of Ukraine;
- Denmark: Commander 1st Class of the Order of the Dannebrog (22 November 2024)
- Egypt: Grand Cordon of the Order of the Nile (6 December 2024)
- India: Mother Teresa Memorial Award 2021 for her exceptional leadership in leading Denmark along the path of sustainable development, as one of the nations in the world which lives in harmony with nature.
- Frederiksen has been included in the list of the "World's 100 most powerful women" by Forbes Magazine every year from 2020 through 2025.

== See also ==
- List of current heads of state and government
- List of heads of the executive by approval rating
- 2026 Danish general election

== Notes ==
Political offices
Preceded by Inger Støjberg	Minister of Employment; 2011–2014	Succeeded by Henrik Dam Kristensen
Preceded by Karen Hækkerup	Minister of Justice; 2014–2015	Succeeded by Søren Pind
Preceded by Lars Løkke Rasmussen	Leader of the Opposition; 2015–2019	Succeeded by Lars Løkke Rasmussen
Preceded by Lars Løkke Rasmussen	Prime Minister of Denmark; 2019–present	Incumbent
Party political offices
Preceded by Helle Thorning-Schmidt	Leader of the Social Democrats; 2015–present	Incumbent
