= 2029 Lithuanian presidential election =

- 13 May 2029
Incumbent President
Gitanas Nausėda

Presidential elections are scheduled to be held in Lithuania on 13 May 2029 to elect a president for a term of five years. The winner of the election will be inaugurated on 12 July 2029.

Gitanas Nausėda, who won the 2019 and 2024 presidential elections, will not be eligible to participate as presidents cannot serve more than two terms.

== Background ==
The Lithuanian president has somewhat more executive authority than their counterparts in neighboring Estonia and Latvia; the Lithuanian president's function is similar to that of the presidents of France and Romania. Similarly to them, but unlike presidents in a fully presidential system such as the United States, the Lithuanian president generally has the most authority in foreign affairs. In addition to the customary diplomatic powers of heads of state, namely receiving the letters of credence of foreign ambassadors and signing treaties, the president determines Lithuania's basic foreign policy guidelines. The president is also the commander-in-chief of the Lithuanian Armed Forces, and accordingly heads the State Defense Council and has the right to appoint the Chief of Defence (subject to Seimas consent).

The president has a significant role in domestic policy, possessing the right to submit bills to the Seimas and to veto laws passed by it, appointing the prime minister and approving the government formed by them, and also having the right to dissolve the Seimas and call snap elections following a successful motion of no confidence or if the Seimas refuses to approve the government's budget within sixty days. However, the next elected Seimas may retaliate by calling for an earlier presidential election. In addition, according to a resolution by the Constitutional Court of Lithuania in 1998, the president is required by law to nominate the candidate of the parliamentary majority to the office of prime minister.

The president also holds informal power, as the office of president is generally more trusted by the populace according to approval polling, and Lithuanian presidents historically blocked legislation and forced the resignation of prime ministers (such as Gediminas Vagnorius in 1998).

== Electoral system ==
The president is elected using the two-round system. To win in the first round, a candidate requires an absolute majority of all votes cast (including invalid votes) and either voter turnout to be above 50% or for their vote share to be equivalent to at least one-third of the number of registered voters. If no candidate wins in the first round, a second round is required, featuring the top two candidates. All candidates for president are independent. While some candidates belong to and/or are supported by a political party, the office of the president is formally non-partisan.

Citizens of Lithuania at least 40 years of age whose at least one parent was also a citizen (natural-born-citizen clause), who have lived in Lithuania for at least three years prior, are not serving a prison sentence, are not on active duty in the Lithuanian Armed Forces, are not bound to any other country by an oath and have not been impeached through the previous 10 years, are allowed to run for president. Each candidate must collect at least 20 thousand signatures by Lithuanian citizens to be able to run for election.

== Candidates ==
=== Declined to be candidates ===
The following individuals have, as of October 2026, publicly denied interest in being a candidate:

- Kęstutis Budrys, Minister of Foreign Affairs (2024–present)
- Robertas Kaunas, Minister of Defence (2025–present)
- Skirmantas Malinauskas, YouTuber and media personality, former advisor to Prime Minister Saulius Skvernelis (2017–20)

=== Ineligible candidates ===
These people are constitutionally prevented from standing for election for any office which requires an oath of office to the Constitution of Lithuania, including President of Lithuania:

- Petras Gražulis – until 2034 due to being convicted during 2023 impeachment vote.

== Opinion polls ==
Dates administered	Pollster / (Booker)	Sample size (Note: General sample, unless otherwise indicated)	MOE	Kęstutis Budrys	Viktorija Čmilytė- Nielsen	Edmundas Jakilaitis	Laurynas Kasčiūnas	Egidijus Kūris	Andrius Kubilius	Gabrielius Landsbergis	Linas Linkevičius	Skirmantas Malinauskas	Živilė Pinskuvienė	Inga Ruginienė	Mindaugas Sinkevičius	Saulius Skvernelis	Ingrida Šimonytė	Andrius Tapinas	Aurelijus Veryga	Ignas Vėgėlė	Dainius Žalimas	Remigijus Žemaitaitis	Other	Don't Know	Will Not Vote
February 19 – March 2, 2026	B / LRT	1,014	± 3.1%	6.8	4.3	2.1	5.3	—N/a						4.1	6.3	6.5	8.7	4.4	3.9	10.4	1.8	9.7	18.4 Juozas Olekas on 2.7% Waldemar Tomaszewski on 2.5% Eduardas Vaitkus on 1.2%	9	—
February 19 – March 2, 2026	B / LRT	376 (Cl)*	Unk.	8.7	5.2	1.3	3.9	—N/a						3.7	6.6	7.4	5	3.5	2.4	12.5	0.8	11.4	20.8 Waldemar Tomaszewski on 3.5% Juozas Olekas on 2.9% Eduardas Vaitkus on 0.8%	8.1	—
February 19 – March 2, 2026	B / LRT	198 (Ll)*	Unk.	6.8	4.7	0.6	3.7	—N/a						5.2	13.4	10.1	3.5	4.7	8.8	12.9	1.3	11.4	9.3 Juozas Olekas on 2.8% Eduardas Vaitkus on 1.4% Waldemar Tomaszewski on 0%	5.3	—
February 19 – March 2, 2026	B / LRT	211 (Rl)*	Unk.	7.4	3.7	1.4	13	—N/a						4.2	3.5	4.5	24.7	4	2.9	5.4	2.7	4.5	14.8 Waldemar Tomaszewski on 4.5% Juozas Olekas on 2.4% Eduardas Vaitkus on 0.4%	5.6	—
February 4–11, 2026	N / 15min	1,000	—N/a (Note: Allowed up to 5 multiple choices)	4	10	4	14	3	3	7	5	4	6	3	2	8	22	13	5	5	5	8	17 Valdas Benkunskas on 2% Nerijus Mačiulis on 2% Vygaudas Ušackas on 2% Eduardas Vaitkus on 2% Alfredas Bumblauskas on 1% Ramūnas Karbauskis on 1% Raimondas Kuodis on 1% Rokas Masiulis on 1% Juozas Olekas on 1% Gintautas Paluckas on 1% Arnoldas Pranckevičius on 1% Dovilė Šakalienė on 1% Waldemar Tomaszewski on 1%	—	
