= Fuglsang (brewery) =

Brewery in Haderslev, Denmark

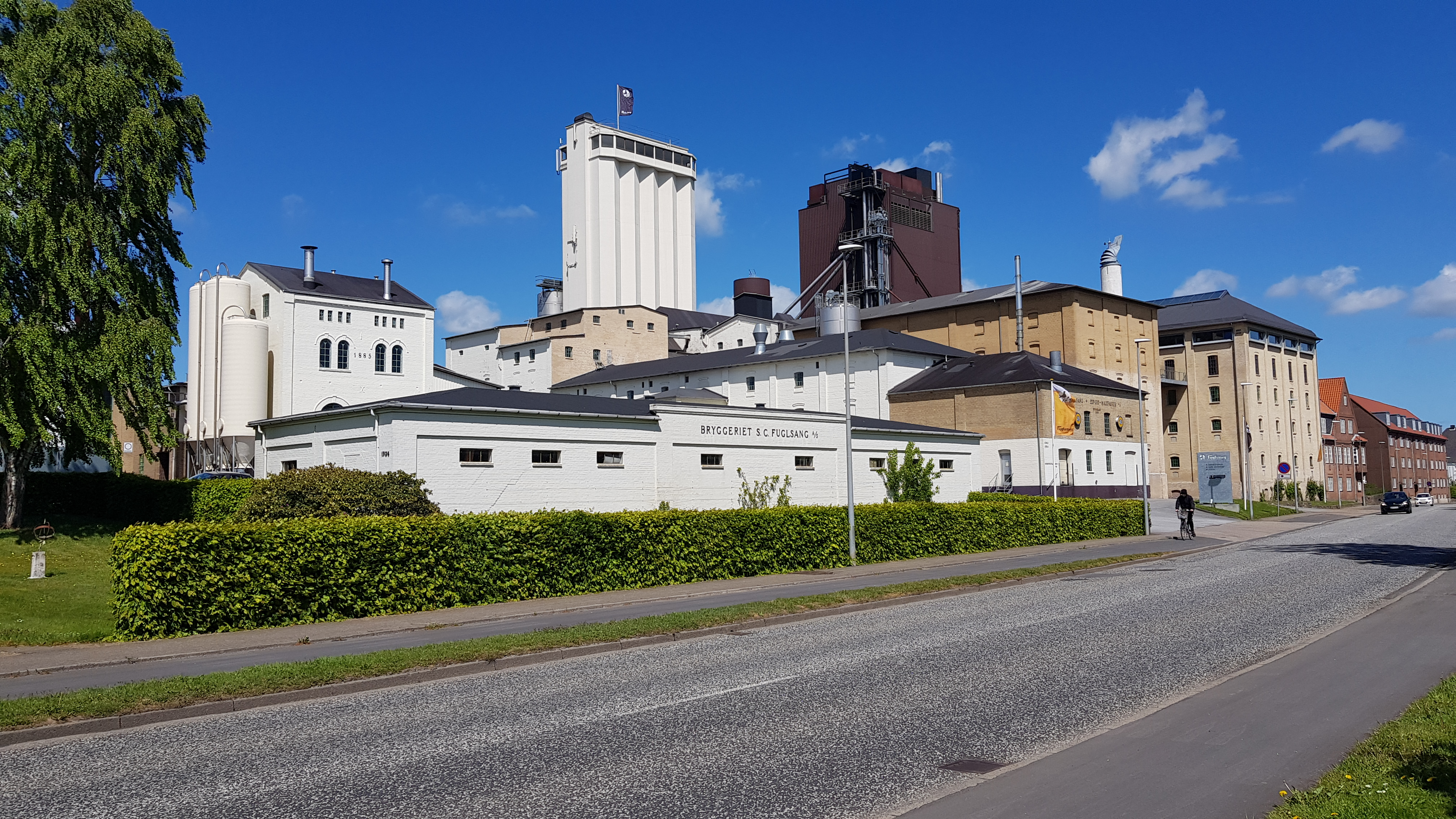
The brewery

Fuglsang is a danish brewery situated in the town of Haderslev in Southern Jutland. In 2021 the company was bought by Royal Unibrew and in 2022 they ceased production at the Haderslev plant. Instead the brewing was moved to Faxe and Odense.

The 2022 line up

- Fuglsang Pilsner: a golden pilsner type.
- Black Bird. Style: Clear taste from Dark Münchner Malt.
- Hvid Bock. Style: Heller Bock -
- Golden Bird. Style: Traditional Danish Export strength beer (Danish: "Guld-øl").
- Early Bird: Style: American hoppy beer with notes of citrus.
- Fuglsang Sea Bird: A bitter, sweet and fresh India pale ale.
- Fuglsang Nighting Ale is a velvety and dark amber Brown ale
