= Defence forces of the European Union =

- Badge of arms of European Union Military Staff
- Headquarters: (Europe) Avenue de Cortenbergh 150, Brussels, Belgium
- Website: europa.eu

Leadership
- High Representative: Kaja Kallas
- Chairman of the EU Military Committee: General Seán Clancy
- Director General of the EU Military Staff: Lt. General Michiel van der Laan

Personnel
- Active personnel: 1.5 million

Expenditure
- Budget: Member states: €343 billion EU SAFE: €150 billion EU Peace Facility: €17 billion

This article outlines the defence forces of the European Union (EU), which implement the EU's Common Security and Defence Policy (CSDP) in EUFOR missions. There are two categories of EU multinational forces: ones that have been established intergovernmentally and made available to the CSDP through Article 42(3) of the Treaty on European Union (TEU), such as the Eurocorps; and units established directly at the EU level, such as EU battlegroups and the Rapid Deployment Capacity.

== EU military or crisis operations ==
The military operations of the EU are typically named with a prefix that is either European Union Force (EUFOR) or European Union Naval Force (EUNAVFOR), depending on whether the operation is terrestrial or at sea. The suffix is typically the area in which the operation took place, e.g. European Naval Force Mediterranean (EUNAVFOR MED). The operations therefore have unique names, although the force may also consist of permanent multinational forces such as the European Corps.

== Pre-organised forces ==
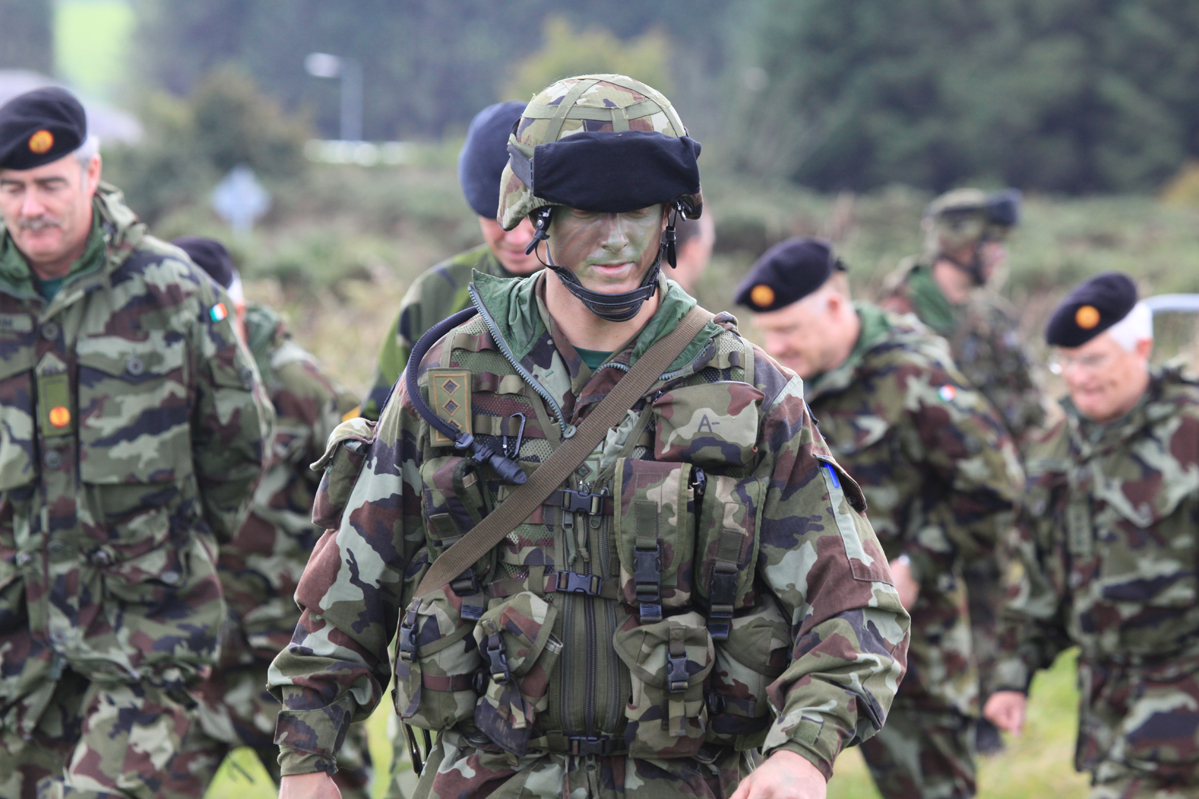
Irish Army personnel from the Nordic Battle Group at an exercise in 2010

The Helsinki Headline Goal Catalogue is a listing of rapid reaction forces composed of 60,000 troops managed by the European Union, but under control of the countries who deliver troops for it. The Headline Goal 2010 was its successor.

Forces introduced at Union level include:

=== EU Battlegroups ===
The EU Battlegroups (BG) adhere to the CSDP, and are based on contributions from a coalition of member states. Each of the eighteen battlegroups consists of a battalion-sized force (1,500 troops) reinforced with combat support elements. The groups rotate actively, so that two are ready for deployment at all times. The forces are under the direct control of the Council of the European Union. The Battlegroups reached full operational capacity on 1 January 2007, although, as of August 2023, they have yet to see any military action. Based on existing ad hoc missions which the European Union (EU) has undertaken, they have been described by some as a new "standing army" for Europe.

The troops and equipment are drawn from the EU member states under a "lead nation". In 2004, United Nations Secretary-General Kofi Annan welcomed the plans and emphasised the value and importance of the Battlegroups in helping the UN deal with troublespots.

=== European Medical Corps ===
The European Medical Corps (EMC) is an incident response team that was launched on 15 February 2016 by the European Union to provide an emergency response force to deal with outbreaks of epidemic disease anywhere in the world. The EMC was formed after the 2014 Ebola outbreak in West Africa when the WHO was criticized for a slow and insufficient response in the early stages of the Ebola outbreak. The EMC is part of the emergency response capacity of European countries. Teams from nine EU member states—Belgium, Luxembourg, Spain, Germany, the Czech Republic, France, the Netherlands, Finland, and Sweden — are available for deployment in an emergency. The EMC consist of medical teams, public health teams, mobile biosafety laboratories, medical evacuation capacities, experts in public health and medical assessment and coordination, and technical and logistics support. Any country in need of assistance can make a request to Emergency Response Coordination Centre, part of the European Commission's Humanitarian Aid and Civil Protection department. The first deployment of the EMC was announced by the European Commissioner for Humanitarian Aid and Civil Protection on 12 May 2016, a response to the outbreak of yellow fever in Angola in 2016. An earlier concept of an emergency medical response team was Task Force Scorpio formed by the United Nations during the first Gulf War.

=== European Medical Command ===
The European Medical Command (EMC) is a planned medical command centre in support of EU missions, formed as part of the Permanent Structured Cooperation (PESCO). The EMC will provide the EU with a permanent medical capability to support operations abroad, including medical resources and a rapidly deployable medical task force. The EMC will also provide medical evacuation facilities, triage and resuscitation, treatment and holding of patients until they can be returned to duty, and emergency dental treatment. It will also contribute to harmonising medical standards, certification and legal (civil) framework conditions.

=== Crisis Response Operation Core ===
EUFOR Crisis Response Operation Core (EUFOR CROC) is a flagship defence project under development as part of the Permanent Structured Cooperation (PESCO) facility. EURFOR CROC will contribute to the creation of a "full spectrum force package" to speed up provision of military forces and the EU's crisis management capabilities. Rather than creating a standing force, the project involves creating a concrete catalogue of military force elements that would speed up the establishment of a force when the EU decides to launch an operation. It is land-focused and aims to generate a force of 60,000 troops from the contributing states alone. While it does not establish any form of "European army", it foresees an deployable, interoperable force under a single command. Germany is the lead country for the project, but the French are heavily involved and it is tied to President Emmanuel Macron's proposal to create a standing intervention force. The French see it as an example of what PESCO is about.

=== Rapid Deployment Capacity ===
A permanent European Union Rapid Deployment Capacity (EU RDC) consisting of up to 5,000 troops (the size of a brigade) is to be operational by 2025. During the German EU presidency in the second half of 2020, CSDP officials began development of the Strategic Compass for Security and Defence, as of November 2021 envisioning a large intervention force described as 'substantially modified EU battlegroups' of 5,000 soldiers by 2025.

The force complied with its schedule and had already become operational by 2025, but its actual deployment remains subject to the political consensus of member states.

=== ReArm Europe Plan/Readiness 2030 ===
During a debate in March 2025, a majority of political groups in the European Parliament expressed strong support for boosting European defence, and hailed the ReArm Europe plan amidst calls for a long-term strategy.

== Provided through the Treaty of European Union ==
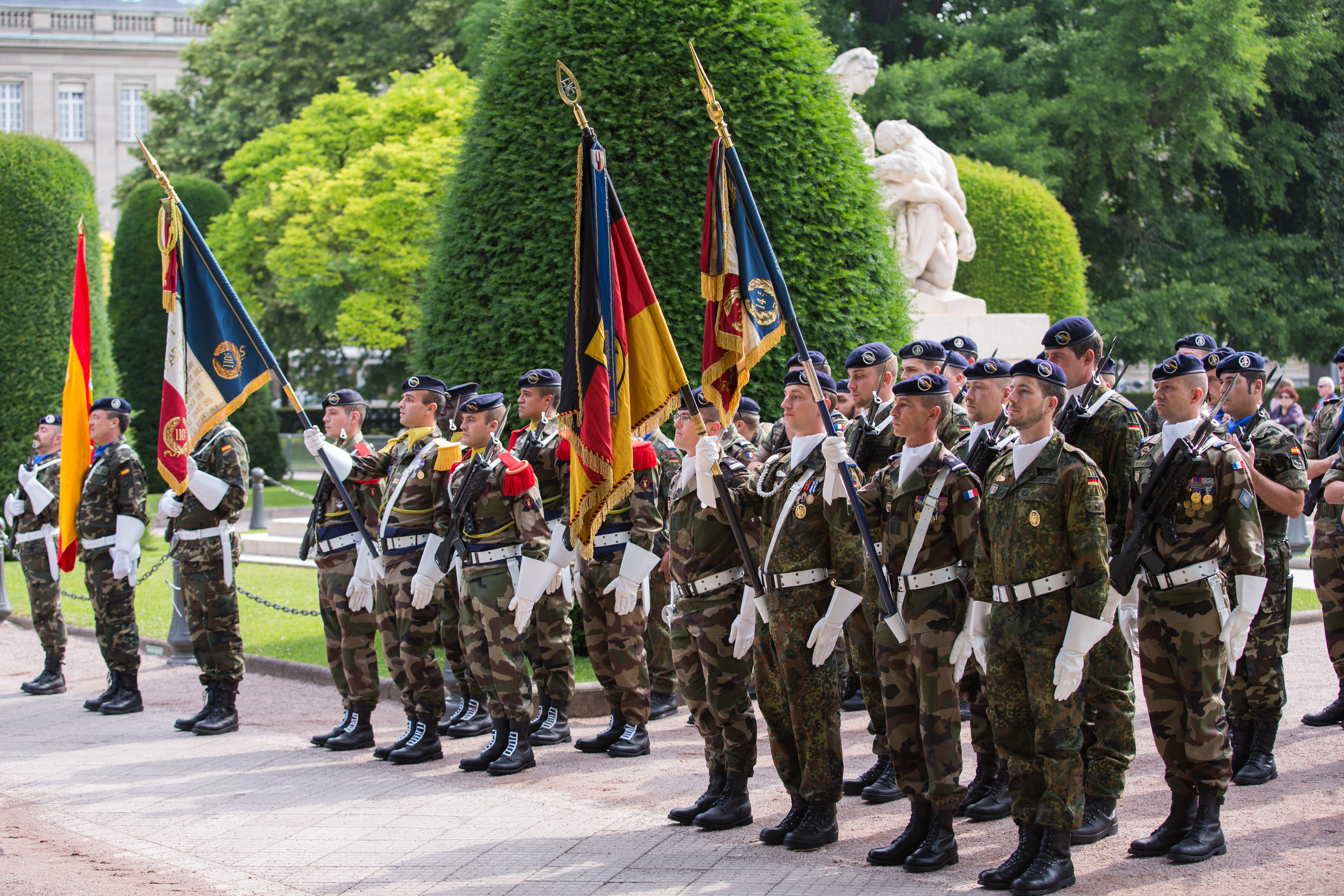
Personnel of the European Corps in Strasbourg, France, during a change of command ceremony in 2013

Location of headquarters of a selection of intergovernmental defence organisations that are established outside the EU framework, but may support the CSDP in accordance with Article 42.3 of the Treaty on European Union

This section presents an incomplete list of forces and bodies established intergovernmentally amongst subsets of Member states of the European Union.

These multinational organizations may also be deployed either in a NATO environment, through the EU, acting upon the mandate of the participating countries, or acting upon the mandate of other international organisations, such as United Nations, or the Organization for Security and Co-operation in Europe.

=== Land forces ===
- The European Corps (Eurocorps) is an army corps whose headquarters numbers approximately 1,000 soldiers, and is stationed in Strasbourg, France. The Franco-German Brigade is associated with the corps.
- The I. German/Dutch Corps is a multinational formation consisting of units from the Dutch and German armies. Due to its role as a NATO High Readiness Forces Headquarters, soldiers from other NATO member states, the United States, Denmark, Norway, Spain, Italy, the United Kingdom amongst others, are also stationed at Münster.
- The Multinational Corps Northeast, a multinational corps established via a Danish-German-Polish corps convention, is a NATO-affiliated force
- The European Gendarmerie Force, abbreviated EUROGENDFOR or EGF, is an intervention force with militarised police functions and specialisation in crisis management.

=== Air forces ===
- The European Air Transport Command (EATC) is the command centre that exercises the operational control of the majority of the aerial refueling capabilities and military transport fleets of the seven participating nations. Located at Eindhoven Airbase in the Netherlands, the command also bears a limited responsibility for exercises, aircrew training and the harmonisation of relevant national air transport regulations. The command was established in 2010 with a view to provide a more efficient management of the participating nations' assets and resources in this field.
- Lithuanian–Polish–Ukrainian Brigade (LITPOLUKRBRIG), a tri-lateral agreement to operate NATO, EU and UN tasks.

=== Naval forces ===
- The European Maritime Force (EUROMARFOR or EMF) is a non-permanent, military force that may carry out naval, air and amphibious operations, with an activation time of five days after an order is received. The force was formed in 1995 to fulfill missions defined in the Petersberg Declaration, such as sea control, humanitarian missions, peacekeeping operations, crisis response operations, and peace enforcement.

=== Multi-component ===
- The Combined Joint Expeditionary Force (CJEF), is a Franco-British military force. It draws upon both the British Armed Forces and the French Armed Forces to field a deployable force with land, air and maritime components together with command and control and supporting logistics. It is distinct from the similarly named Joint Expeditionary Force. The Combined Joint Expeditionary Force (or CJEF) is envisaged as a deployable, combined Franco-British military force for use in a wide range of crisis scenarios, up to and including high intensity combat operations. As a joint force it involves all three armed Services: a land component composed of formations at national brigade level, maritime and air components with their associated Headquarters, together with logistics and support functions. The CJEF is not conceived as a standing force but rather as available at notice for UK-French bilateral, NATO, European Union, United Nations or other operations. Combined air and land exercises commenced during 2011 with a view towards developing a full capability. The CJEF is also seen as a potential stimulus towards greater interoperability and coherence in military doctrine, training and equipment requirements.

== Member state participation in various force-related organisations ==
Overview and EU member states' participation
	Finabel	European Corps	European Gendarmerie Force	European Air Transport Command	European Air Group	European Maritime Force	European Rapid Operational Force	Movement Coordination Centre Europe (Note: The membership of Movement Coordination Centre Europe also includes some countries outside the union)	Organisation for Joint Armament Cooperation
Abbreviation	None	Eurocorps	EUROGENDFOR, EGF	EATC	EAG	EUROMARFOR, EMF	EUROFOR	MCCE	OCCAR
Arms	Finabel	European Corps	European Gendarmerie Force	European Air Transport Command	European Air Group	European Maritime Force	European Rapid Operational Force	Movement Coordination Centre Europe	
Branch	Terrestrial			Aerial		Naval	Multi-component		
Description	Organisation promoting interoperability	Corps	Gendarmerie	Command for refueling and transport capabilities	Organisation promoting interoperability	Non-standing force	Rapid reaction force	Control centre for movement	Control centre for armament
Founded	1953	1992	2006	2010	1995	1995	(1995–2012)	2007	1996
Seat	Brussels	Strasbourg	Vicenza	Eindhoven	RAF High Wycombe	—N/a	Florence	Eindhoven	Brussels
Capacity	—N/a	60 000 troops	2 300 troops	220 aircraft	—N/a	—N/a	12 000 troops	—N/a	—N/a
Response time	—N/a	30 days	30 days	—N/a	—N/a	5 days	5 days	—N/a	—N/a
Motto	Reflexion serving military action	None	Lex paciferat	Integrated, innovative, efficient	Improved capability through interoperability	At sea for peace	None	None	None
Working language	English	English	Unknown	English	Unknown	Unknown	Unknown	Unknown	Unknown
	Membership (year of accession)								
Austria	No	No	—N/a	No	No	—N/a	No	2010	No
Belgium	1953	1993	—N/a	2010	1997	No	No	2007	2003
Bulgaria	No	No	No	No	No	No	No	2017	No
Cyprus	2008	No	—N/a	No	No	No	No	No	No
Croatia	2017	No	—N/a	No	No	No	No	2011	No
Czech Republic	2012	No	—N/a	No	No	—N/a	No	2010	No
Denmark	No	No	—N/a	No	No	No	No	2007	No
Estonia	No	No	—N/a	No	No	No	No	2007	No
Finland	2008	No	—N/a	No	No	No	No	2007	No
France	1953	1992	2006	2010	1995	1995	1995	2007	1996
Germany	1956	1992	—N/a	2010	1997	No	No	2007	1996
Greece	1996	No	—N/a	No	No	No	No	No	No
Hungary	2015	No	No	No	No	—N/a	No	2007	No
Ireland	No	No	—N/a	No	No	No	No	No	No
Italy	1953	No	2006	2015	1997	1995	1995	2007	1996
Latvia	2016	No	—N/a	No	No	No	No	2007	No
Lithuania	No	No	2025	No	No	No	No	2015	No
Luxembourg	1953	1996	—N/a	2012	No	—N/a	No	2007	No
Malta	2010	No	—N/a	No	No	No	No	No	No
Netherlands	1953	No	2006	2010	1997	No	No	2007	No
Poland	2006	2022	2011	No	No	No	No	2008	No
Portugal	1996	No	2006	No	No	1995	1995	2010	No
Romania	2008	No	2009	No	No	No	No	2008	No
Slovakia	2006	No	—N/a	No	No	—N/a	No	2015	No
Slovenia	2016	No	—N/a	No	No	No	No	2007	No
Spain	1990	1994	2006	2014	1997	1995	1995	2007	2005
Sweden	2015	No	—N/a	No	No	No	No	2007	No

== See also ==
- Permanent Structured Cooperation
- Helsinki Headline Goal
- European Border and Coast Guard Agency
- List of military and civilian missions of the European Union
- European Army
- European Defence Union
