= Security and defence partnerships of the European Union =

European Union EU Security and Defence Partners

The European Union has signed security and defence partnerships with several countries, namely Albania, Australia, Canada, Ghana, Iceland, India, Japan, Moldova, North Macedonia, Norway, South Korea, and the United Kingdom. Starting from May 2024, the EU has sought to enhance its partnership toolkit through tailored bilateral agreements with like-minded countries and strategic partners, in accordance with the Strategic Compass for Security and Defence approved in 2022.

== List of partnerships ==
The European Union has intensified its external engagement in this area by signing security and defence partnerships with the following countries:

Countries that signed security and defence partnerships with the European Union
Country	Date	Details
Moldova	21 May 2024	Two years after the Russian invasion of Ukraine, Moldova became the first country to sign a security and defence partnership with the European Union. In order to enhance the country's resilience from external threats and destabilization efforts, the agreement is broadly aimed at addressing common security challenges, strengthening Moldova's defence sector, as well as expanding cooperation in areas of border management, crisis management, counter-terrorism, human trafficking, organized crime, cybersecurity and combating disinformation. At the time of signing, Moldova had been an EU candidate since June 2022. Moldovan neutrality is enshrined in its constitution.
Norway	28 May 2024	Norway, a long-standing member of NATO and the European Economic Area, became the second country to sign a security and defence partnership with the European Union. The pact aims to deepen their strong bilateral relations in the context of EU and Norway's continued support to Ukraine, as well as Norway's participation in EU missions and its involvement in EU defence initiatives. Among the areas of strengthened cooperation echoed in the agreement were maritime security, resilience of critical infrastructure (e.g. underwater infrastructure), space security, cybersecurity, hybrid threats, counter-terrorism, and other related areas of concern.
Japan	1 November 2024	Amid growing tensions with China, North Korea and Russia, Japan became the first Asian country to sign a security and defence partnership with the European Union. Given their common strategic interests both in Europe and in the Indo-Pacific, the two parties agree to increase their cooperation in areas of maritime security, space security, cybersecurity, hybrid threats, counter-terrorism, and the exchange of information on defence industry-related matters. Japan is in a military alliance with the United States, and is also a member of the Quad. The pacifist clause in the Japanese Constitution outlaws war as a means to settle international disputes.
South Korea	4 November 2024	Against the backdrop of mounting friction in the Indo-Pacific area, as well as North Korea's involvement in the Russian invasion of Ukraine, South Korea became the second Asian country to sign a security and defence partnership with the European Union. Considering that South Korea and the EU's perspectives are aligned in terms of their security environment, they agree to further their cooperation in matters of international peace and crisis management (e.g. peacekeeping operations), maritime security, space security, cybersecurity, hybrid threats, counter-terrorism, and external aspects of economic security. South Korea has been in a military alliance with the United States since 1953.
North Macedonia	19 November 2024	The ongoing, unprovoked and unjustified war of aggression by Russia against Ukraine highlights the critical importance of unity and close cooperation within the EU and with its closest partners. North Macedonia is a candidate to join the European Union and an important and valuable partner for the EU in the areas of security and defence. As such, it is also an active third state participant in the EU’s Common Security and Defence Policy (CSDP).
Albania	18 December 2024	The ongoing, unprovoked and unjustified war of aggression by Russia against Ukraine highlights the critical importance of unity and close cooperation within the EU and with its closest partners. Albania is a candidate to join the European Union and has long been a valuable and trusted partner for the EU in the areas of security and defence. As such, it is also actively contributing to the EU Common Security and Defence Policy (CSDP) missions and operations.
United Kingdom	19 May 2025	This new Partnership provides a structured, forward-looking framework for EU–UK dialogue and cooperation in security and defence areas, such as: Peacebuilding; Common Security and Defence Policy (CSDP) civilian and military crisis management; Maritime Security; Space Security; Cyber issues and emerging disruptive technologies; Countering hybrid threats and resilience of critical infrastructure; Fighting foreign information manipulation; Counterterrorism and preventing/countering violent extremism; Climate and security nexus; External aspects of economic security and irregular migration.
Canada	23 June 2025	The EU–Canada Security and Defence Partnership marks a significant step forward in deepening cooperation across several areas, including crisis management, defence industry collaboration, hybrid threats and military mobility.
India	27 January 2026	The Security and Defence partnership between the European Union and India extends cooperation in a variety of areas, such as hybrid threads, maritime security, protection of critical infrastructure, defence initiatives, counterterrorism and multilateral cooperation.
Iceland	18 March 2026	The Security and Defence Partnership deepens cooperation on regional security issues and strengthens cooperation in areas like support to Ukraine, Arctic matters and maritime security, cyber issues, emerging and disruptive technologies, economic security, and climate change and security nexus.
Australia	18 March 2026	The Security and Defence Partnership enhances and deepens cooperation across several areas, such as maritime security, cyber security, hybrid threats and artificial intelligence.
Ghana	24 March 2026	Amid growing Islamist threats in neighbouring countries, Ghana became the first African country to sign a security and defence partnership with the European Union. The Security and Defence Partnership provides a structured and forward-looking framework to deepen cooperation and address shared threats, including: Regional instability and terrorism; Hybrid and cyber threats; Maritime security challenges; Climate-related security risks; Transnational organised crime; The partnership establishes a dedicated annual EU–Ghana Security and Defence Dialogue, ensuring sustained political engagement and strategic direction for the partnership.

== Background ==
Rather than concluding treaties or alliances with external partners, the European Union's approach towards security and defence has been a slow and gradual internal consolidation since the 1950s. For example, in the early post-war period, the Western Union and the European Defence Community both failed and were cannibalized by NATO. An initial impetus towards foreign policy coordination was brought about by the European Political Cooperation, which was replaced by the Common Foreign and Security Policy in 1993. Under this, the European Security Strategy was launched in 2003, and was replaced by an updated European Union Global Strategy in 2016. The Treaty of Lisbon introduced the Common Security and Defence Policy, which established a mutual defence clause between EU countries for the first time.

Since 2016, a number of new initiatives were set in motion to actualize the new security strategy in the wake of the Russian annexation of Crimea, Brexit, and the election of Donald Trump. Among these are:

- Permanent Structured Cooperation (PESCO)
- Coordinated Annual Review on Defence (CARD)
- European Defence Fund (EDF)
- Military Planning and Conduct Capability (MPCC)
- Directorate-General for Defence Industry and Space (DG DEFIS).

There has also been growing calls for the creation of a continental defence force or an EU army, especially after the Russian invasion of Ukraine. The idea of increasing common defence capabilities also enjoys wide acceptance among EU citizens.

== See also ==
- Common Foreign and Security Policy
- Common Security and Defence Policy
- European Defence Agency
- European Union as an emerging superpower
- European Union–NATO relations
- History of the Common Security and Defence Policy
- Major non-NATO ally
- NATO
