= Strategic Compass for Security and Defence =

The Strategic Compass for Security and Defence is a roadmap document written by the European External Action Service in 2022. and adopted on 25 May 2022 by the European Council. Josep Borrell, the foreign policy chief at the time, said that it was a "turning point for the European Union as a security provider and an important step for the European security and defence policy." He also said that given the 2022 Russian invasion of Ukraine, a "sea change in EU security and defence" was necessary. The document is seen as a parallel to the National Security Strategy of the United States. It was the first time a collective threat assessment procedure was written. A lengthy list of deliverables included the birth of the Rapid Deployment Capacity, by 2025. Its intended reach was global. A lecturer thought that "Russia has unleashed the strongest push to strengthen Europe’s defence since the end of the Cold War", and that this document provided the necessary impetus.

== History ==
In June 1992 the Western European Union issued the Petersberg Declaration, which set a number of tasks to be fulfilled by the collective of a humanitarian, disarming, peacekeeping and peacemaking nature in foreign lands, such as the Baltic states but the statement left to a future point decisions on funding and personnel.

Chartered in May 1995 to serve the Petersberg Declaration, the 12,000 man European Rapid Operational Force (EUROFOR) was a multinational rapid reaction force composed of forces from four states of the European Union: Italy, France, Portugal and Spain. On 2 July 2012 Eurofor was dissolved after seeing service in Albania (2000) and North Macedonia (2003).

In December 1998 a proposal for a 60,000-man strong force was discussed by Tony Blair and Jacques Chirac but it went nowhere because of Madeleine Albright's "no duplication" stipulation and William Cohen's year 2000 threat to disband NATO if a rapid reaction force were built.

The Helsinki Headline Goal was published in December 1999 and was supposed to establish a European Rapid Reaction Force, which was based on Tony Blair's observation that Europe had not performed well in the Bosnian War where only after NATO intervened in 1995 did the conflict simmer down. They realized when NATO bombed Serbia because of the Kosovo War that they had no tools to defuse a similar conflict even though it was near to their borders.

In 2003 a European Security Strategy was published.

In June 2004 was published Headline Goal 2010. It included 'battle groups', non-permanent combat units which were set up for six months each and consisted of around 1,500 soldiers, and the improvement of air capabilities.

In December 2004 Operation Althea saw 1,100 members of EUFOR take over peacekeeper services in Bosnia from NATO, who had had 60,000 men stationed in the country under Operation Joint Endeavour.

The European Gendarmerie Force was constituted in 2006 as a rapid reaction force composed of elements of several European police and gendarmerie forces, but stops short of a military component.

In May 2007 "A Strategy for the European Defence Technological and Industrial Base" document was published.

In December 2008 a proposal was circulated for a force of 60,000 men to be deployed to a major crisis within 60 days. Another controversy, prompted by a request for a 17,000-man deployment to the Democratic Republic of Congo by Ban Ki-Moon, developed around the "battle group" concept.

In November 2017 Emmanuel Macron proposed a European Intervention Initiative force.

== See also ==
- European Union Global Strategy
