= European Rapid Operational Force =

1995–2012 multinational rapid reaction force

EUROFOR
- Active: 1995–2012
- Allegiance: European Union
- Type: Rapid reaction force
- Size: 12,000 (1995)
- Garrison/HQ: Florence
- Engagements: Albania; North Macedonia

The European Rapid Operational Force (EUROFOR) was a multinational rapid reaction force composed of forces from four states of the European Union (EU): Italy, France, Portugal and Spain. It had a permanent staff capable of commanding operations, involving commitments of up to a Light Division in size. Eurofor was formed in May 1995 in Lisbon, and was answerable to the Western European Union (WEU) directly. It was tasked with performing Petersberg tasks, including humanitarian, peacekeeping and peace enforcement missions. With the merger of several WEU elements into the European Union, Eurofor had by and large become part of the Common Security and Defence Policy. It was eventually transformed into an EU battlegroup and was on standby from 1 July until 31 December 2011. On 2 July 2012, EUROFOR was dissolved.

== Operations ==
The ribbon bar of the Eurofor Service Medal

Eurofor has been involved in three deployments:

- 2000–2001: Mission Albania: In response to a refugee crisis in Albania following the Kosovo War. The deployment was initially part of NATO operation "Allied Harbor" and once NATO ground forces entered Kosovo, Eurofor's mission also incorporated the defence of NATO supply lines through Albania.
- 2003: Mission Macedonia: Under the wing of the European Union, as part of EUFOR Concordia. Formally, Eurofor became answerable directly to the European Union, through the Political and Security Committee. This operation began on 31 March 2003 when the Macedonian authorities invited assistance with the goal of the establishment of a stable and secure environment in Macedonia (now North Macedonia). This mission officially ended on 15 December 2004.
- 2007: Bosnia and Herzegovina

== See also ==
- European Maritime Force
- European Gendarmerie Force
- Eurocorps
- EU Battlegroup
