= Common Security and Defence Policy =

Defence policy of the European Union

Common Security and Defence Policy (European Defence Union)
- Arms of the Military Staff (EUMS), which includes the EU's permanent operation headquarters, MPCC
- Founded: 1999 (as the European Security and Defence Policy)
- Current form: 2009 (Treaty of Lisbon)
- Headquarters: Military (MPCC) and Civilian (CPCC) Planning and Conduct Capabilities, Kortenberg building, Brussels, Belgium
- Website: eeas.europa.eu

Leadership
- High Representative: Kaja Kallas
- Director General of the Military Staff: Lieutenant General Michiel van der Laan
- Chairman of the Military Committee: General Seán Clancy

Personnel
- Active personnel: 1,410,626 (2016)
- Reserve personnel: 2,330,803

Expenditure
- Budget: €343 billion ($391 billion) (2024)
- Percent of GDP: 1.9% (2024)

Related articles
- History: History of the Common Security and Defence Policy

The Common Security and Defence Policy (CSDP) is the European Union's (EU) course of action in the fields of defence and crisis management, and a main component of the EU's Common Foreign and Security Policy (CFSP).

The CSDP involves the deployment of military or civilian missions to preserve peace, prevent conflict and strengthen international security in accordance with the principles of the United Nations Charter. Military missions are carried out by EU forces established with secondments from the member states' armed forces. The CSDP also entails collective self-defence amongst member states (Note: The responsibility of collective self-defence within the CSDP is based on Article 42.7 of TEU, which states that this responsibility does not prejudice the specific character of the security and defence policy of certain member states, referring to policies of neutrality. See Neutral country§European Union for discussion on this subject. According to the Article 42.7 "If a Member State is the victim of armed aggression on its territory, the other Member States shall have towards it an obligation of aid and assistance by all the means in their power, in accordance with Article 51 of the United Nations Charter. This shall not prejudice the specific character of the security and defence policy of certain Member States." Article 42.2 furthermore specifies that NATO shall be the main forum for the implementation of collective self-defence for EU member states that are also NATO members.) as well as a Permanent Structured Cooperation (PESCO) in which 26 of the 27 national armed forces pursue structural integration (the exception being Malta). The CSDP structure – headed by the Union's High Representative (HR/VP), Kaja Kallas, and sometimes referred to as the European Defence Union (EDU) in relation to its prospective development as the EU's defence arm (Note: Akin to the EU's banking union, economic and monetary union and customs union.) – comprises:

- the European Commission's Defence Industry Directorate-General
- the External Action Service's (EEAS) Crisis Management and Planning Directorate (CMPD) and permanent Operation Headquarters (OHQs) for command and control (C2) at the military/civilian strategic level, i.e. the MPCC and CPCC.
- a number of Foreign Affairs Council (FAC) preparatory bodies – such as the Military Committee (EUMC)
- four agencies, including the Defence Agency (EDA).

The EU command and control structures are much smaller than the North Atlantic Treaty Organization's (NATO) Command Structure (NCS), which has been established for territorial defence. It has been agreed that NATO's Allied Command Operations (ACO) may be used for the conduct of the EU's missions. The MPCC, established in 2017 and to be strengthened in 2020, is the EU's first permanent military OHQ. In parallel, the European Defence Fund (EDF, established in 2017) marks the first time the EU budget is used to finance multinational defence projects.

The High Representative proposes CSDP decisions, the Foreign Affairs Council adopts them (generally requiring unanimity), and the High Representative implements them.

== History ==
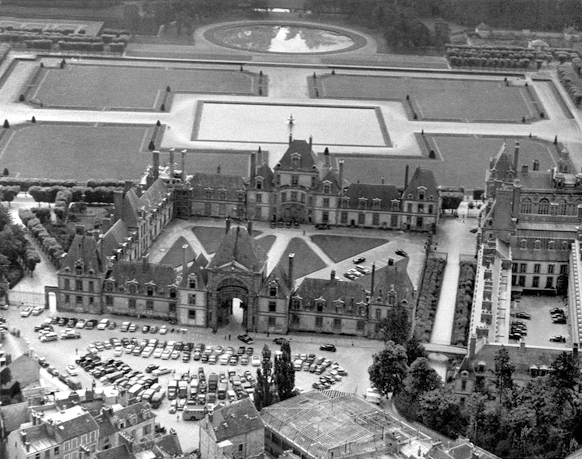
The commands of Western Union service branches were situated in the Palace of Fontainebleau from 1948 until they were transformed into NATO's Supreme Headquarters Allied Powers Europe in 1951.

Organizational chart for the European Defence Community (EDC), which – if ratified – would create a unified European defence force. This force would represent an autonomous European pillar within NATO, under the authority of the Supreme Commander.

The post-war period saw several short-lived or ill-fated initiatives for European defence integration intended to protect against potential Soviet or German aggression: The Western Union (WU, also referred to as the Brussels Treaty Organisation, BTO) and the proposed European Defence Community (EDC) were respectively cannibalised by the North Atlantic Treaty Organisation (NATO) and rejected by the French Parliament. The Western European Union (WEU) succeeded the WU in 1955, (Note: While the Brussels Pact was amended in 1954, it entered into force in 1955.) but was largely overshadowed by NATO.

In 1970, the European Political Cooperation (EPC) brought about the European Communities' (EC) initial foreign policy coordination. Opposition to the addition of security and defence matters to the EPC led to the reactivation of the WEU in 1984 by its member states, which were also EC member states.

European defence integration gained momentum soon after the end of the Cold War, partly because of the EC's failure to prevent the Yugoslav Wars. In 1992, the WEU was given new tasks, and the following year the Treaty of Maastricht founded the EU and replaced the EPC with the Common Foreign and Security Policy (CFSP) pillar. In 1996 NATO agreed to let the WEU develop a so-called European Security and Defence Identity (ESDI). The 1998 St. Malo declaration signalled that the traditionally hesitant United Kingdom was prepared to provide the EU with autonomous defence structures. This facilitated the transformation of the ESDI into the European Security and Defence Policy (ESDP) in 1999, when it was transferred to the EU. In 2003, the EU deployed its first CSDP missions and adopted the European Security Strategy, identifying common threats and objectives. In 2009, the Treaty of Lisbon introduced the present name, CSDP, while establishing the EEAS, the mutual defence clause and enabling a subset of member states to pursue defence integration within PESCO. In 2011, the WEU, whose tasks had been transferred to the EU, was dissolved. In 2016, a new security strategy was introduced, which, along with the Russian annexation of Crimea, the British withdrawal from the EU and the election of Donald Trump as US president, gave the CSDP a new impetus.

=== Deployments ===
Since 2002, the European Union has intervened abroad thirty-five times in three different continents.

The first deployment of European troops under the ESDP, following the 1999 declaration of intent, was in March 2003 in the Republic of Macedonia (now North Macedonia). Operation Concordia used NATO assets, was considered a success, and was replaced later that year by a smaller police mission, EUPOL Proxima. Since then, other small police, justice, and monitoring missions have followed. As well as in the Republic of Macedonia, the EU has maintained its deployment of peacekeepers in Bosnia and Herzegovina, as part of Operation Althea.

Between May and September 2003, EU troops were deployed to the Democratic Republic of the Congo (DRC) during "Operation Artemis" under a mandate given by UN Security Council Resolution 1484 which aimed to prevent further atrocities and violence in the Ituri Conflict and put the DRC's peace process back on track. This established the "framework nation" system for future deployments. The EU returned to the DRC during July–November 2006 with EUFOR RD Congo, which supported the UN mission there during the country's elections.

Geographically, EU missions outside the Balkans and the DRC have taken place in Georgia, Indonesia, Sudan, Palestine, and Ukraine–Moldova. There is also a judicial mission in Iraq (EUJUST Lex). On 28 January 2008, the EU deployed its largest and most multinational mission to Africa, EUFOR Tchad/RCA. The UN-mandated mission involves troops from 25 EU states (19 in the field) deployed in areas of eastern Chad and the north-eastern Central African Republic in order to improve security in those regions. EUFOR Tchad/RCA reached full operational capability in mid-September 2008, and handed over security duties to the UN (MINURCAT mission) in mid-March 2009.

The EU launched its first maritime CSDP operation on 12 December 2008 (Operation Atalanta). The European Union Naval Force (EU NAVFOR) was created in response to this operation, which has continued to combat piracy off the coast of Somalia successfully for nearly a decade. A second such intervention was launched in 2015 to tackle migration problems in the southern Mediterranean (EUNAVFOR Med), working under the name Operation SOPHIA.

Most of the CSDP missions deployed so far are mandated to support security sector reforms (SSR) in host states. A core principle of CSDP support to SSR is local ownership. The EU Council defines ownership as "the appropriation by the local authorities of the commonly agreed objectives and principles". Despite EU's strong rhetorical attachment to the local ownership principle, research shows that CSDP missions continue to be an externally driven, top-down and supply-driven endeavour, resulting often in the low degree of local participation.

== Structure ==
The CSDP involves military or civilian missions being deployed to preserve peace, prevent conflict and strengthen international security in accordance with the principles of the United Nations Charter. Military missions are carried out by EU forces established with contributions from the member states' armed forces. The CSDP also entails collective self-defence amongst member states as well as a Permanent Structured Cooperation (PESCO) in which 26 of the 27 national armed forces pursue structural integration. The CSDP structure, headed by the Union's High Representative (HR/VP), Kaja Kallas, comprises:

- the Defence Industry Directorate-General of the European Commission
- relevant sections of the External Action Service (EEAS) — including the Military Staff (EUMS) with its so-called Military Planning and Conduct Capability (MPCC)
- a number of Foreign Affairs Council (FAC) preparatory bodies – such as the Military Committee (EUMC)
- four agencies, including the European Defence Agency (EDA).

While the EU has a command and control (C2) structure, it has no standing permanent military structure along the lines of the North Atlantic Treaty Organization's (NATO) Allied Command Operations (ACO), although it has been agreed that ACO resources may be used for the conduct of the EU's CSDP missions. The MPCC, established in 2017 and to be strengthened in 2020, does, however, represent the EU's first step in developing a permanent military headquarters. In parallel, the newly established European Defence Fund (EDF) marks the first time the EU budget is used to finance multinational defence projects. The CSDP structure is sometimes referred to as the European Defence Union (EDU), especially in relation to its prospective development as the EU's defence arm. (Note: Akin to the EU's banking union, economic and monetary union and customs union.)

Decisions relating to the CSDP are proposed by the HR/VP, adopted by the FAC, generally requiring unanimity, and then implemented by the HR/VP. The EU command and control (C2) structure is directed by political bodies composed of member states' representatives, and generally requires unanimous decisions. As of April 2019:

Liaison: Advice and recommendations Support and monitoring Preparatory work

Political strategic level:^{[5]}
ISS	EUCO Pres. (EUCO)	Chain of command
Coordination/support
SatCen	CIVCOM	HR/VP (FAC)
INTCEN	HR/VP (PMG)	HR/VP (PSC)^{[6]}	CEUMC (EUMC)
CMPD	DGEUMS^{[3]} (EUMS)
Military/civilian strategic level:
Dir MPCC^{[3]} (MPCC)	JSCC	Civ OpCdr CPCC^{[1]}
Operational level:
MFCdr^{[4]} (MFHQ)	HoM^{[1]}
Tactical level:
CC^{[2]}Air; CC^{[2]} Land; CC^{[2]} Mar; Other CCs^{[2]} European Armed Forces

^{1} In the event of a CSDP Civilian Mission also being in the field, the relations with the Civilian Planning and Conduct Capability (CPCC) and its Civilian Operation Commander (Civ OpCdr), as well as the subordinate Head of Mission (HoM), are coordinated as shown.

^{2} Other Component Commanders (CCs) and service branches which may be established.

^{3} The MPCC is part of the EUMS and Dir MPCC is double-hatted as DGEUMS. Unless the MPCC is used as Operation Headquarters (OHQ), either a national OHQ offered by member states or the NATO Command Structure (NCS) would serve this purpose. In the latter instance, Deputy Supreme Allied Commander Europe (DSACEUR) (since BREXIT, DSACEUR being British, the SHAPE Vice Chief of Staff), rather than Dir MPCC, would serve as Operation Commander (OpCdr).

^{4} Unless the MPCC is used as Operation Headquarters (OHQ), the MFCdr would be known as a Force Commander (FCdr), and direct a Force Headquarters (FHQ) rather than a MFHQ. Whereas the MFHQ would act both on the operational and tactical level, the FHQ would act purely on the operational level.

^{5} The political strategic level is not part of the C2 structure per se, but represents the political bodies, with associated support facilities, that determine the missions' general direction. The Council determines the role of the High Representative (HR/VP), who serves as Vice-President of the European Commission, attends European Council meetings, chairs the Foreign Affairs Council (FAC) and may chair the Political and Security Committee (PSC) in times of crisis. The HR/VP proposes and implements CSDP decisions.

^{6} Same composition as Committee of Permanent Representatives (COREPER) II, which also prepares for the CSDP-related work of the FAC.

== Strategy ==
The European Union Global Strategy (EUGS) is the updated doctrine of the EU to improve the effectiveness of the CSDP, including the defence and security of the member states, the protection of civilians, cooperation between the member states' armed forces, management of immigration, crises, etc. Adopted on 28 June 2016, it replaces the European Security Strategy of 2003. The EUGS is complemented by a document titled "Implementation Plan on Security and Defence" (IPSD). Deterrence theory is applied to deter aggressors as a core mandate of the Common Security and Defence Policy, yet it lacks credibility because of insufficient resources.

== Forces ==
A new Action Plan on military mobility and cyber resilience was released on 10 November 2022.

=== National ===
National armed forces' personnel combined (2016)
View source data.

The CSDP is implemented using civilian and military contributions from member states' armed forces, which also are obliged to collective self-defence based on Treaty on European Union (TEU).

Five EU states host nuclear weapons: France has its own nuclear programmes, while Belgium, Germany, Italy and the Netherlands host US nuclear weapons as part of NATO's nuclear sharing policy. Combined, the EU possesses 300 warheads and hosts between 90 and 130 US warheads. Italy hosts 70-90 B61 nuclear bombs, while Germany, Belgium, and the Netherlands each have 10- 20. The EU has the third largest arsenal of nuclear weapons, after the United States and Russia.

==== Expenditure and personnel ====
The following table presents the military expenditures of the members of the European Union in euros (€). The combined military expenditure of the member states amounted to €223.4 billion in 2018. This represents 1.4% of European Union GDP. European military expenditure includes spending on joint projects such as the Eurofighter Typhoon and joint procurement of equipment. In 2016, the European Union's combined active military forces totalled 1,410,626 personnel.

In a speech in 2012, Swedish General Håkan Syrén criticised the spending levels of European Union countries, saying that in the future those countries' military capability will decrease, creating "critical shortfalls".

In May 2025, EU member states agreed to launch a €150bn loans-for-arms fund backed by the bloc’s shared budget. The initiative will allow EU countries to borrow from Brussels and spend on weapons systems and platforms through joint procurement.

Guide to table:

- All figure entries in the table below are provided by the European Defence Agency for the year 2017, except for Germany's personnel figure, which is for 2016. Figures from other sources are not included.
- The "operations & maintenance expenditure" category may in some circumstances also include finances on top of the nation's defence budget.
- The categories "troops prepared for deployed operations" and "troops prepared for deployed and sustained operation" only include land force personnel.

Member state	Expenditure (€ mn.)	Per capita (€)	% of GDP	Operations & maintenance expenditure (€ mn.)	Active military personnel	Land troops prepared for deployed and sustained operations	Reserve personnel
Austria	2,673	301	0.74	574	24,190	1,100	950,000
Belgium	5,672	349	1.1	680	27,789	1,293	3,300
Bulgaria	1,140	109	1.56	118	30,218	1,168	3,000
Croatia	950	149	1.5	154	14,862	796	18,343
Cyprus	470	409	1.83	63	20,000	0	75,000
Czech Republic	3,310	184	1.46	474	23,036	672	3,236
Estonia	748	363	2.31	158	6,178	100	60,000
Finland	4,873	523	2.15	919	7,515	1,738	900,000
France	49,700	609	1.79	10,201	208,251	17,000	38,550
Germany	57,300	489	1.53		177,608		29,200
Greece	7,086	393	3.82	504	106,624	2,432	
Hungary	2,200	122	1.66	492	23,846	1,000	20,000
(Republic of Ireland) Ireland	780	191	0.31	103	9,500	850	1,778
Italy	26,310	339	1.6	1,583	181,116		18,300
Latvia	758	243	2.23	132	5,686	75	3,000
Lithuania	1,028	256	2.13	145	14,350		26,000
Luxembourg	389	484	0.56	30	824	57	
Malta	54	122	0.51	8	1,808	30	
Netherlands	12,900	507	1.5	2,144	40,196	1,500	5,046
Poland	11,940	226	2.2	1,918	106,500	60	75,400
Portugal	3,975	235	1.6	142	32,726	1,698	
Romania	5,590	185	2.0	277	69,542	2,961	50,000
Slovakia	1,520	183	1.75	198	13,152	846	
Slovenia	548	204	1.04	72	6,342	707	1,000
Spain	15,660	231	1.2	1,891	120,812	7,410	15,150
Sweden	5,620	460	1.1	1,973	14,500	750	34,500
(European Union) EU	222,194	365	1.50		1,287,171		2,330,803

==== Naval forces ====
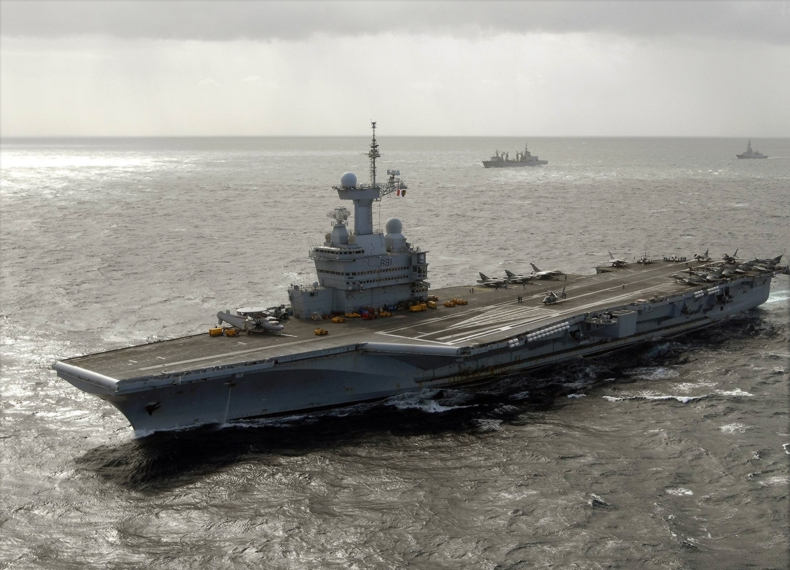
The French aircraft carrier Charles de Gaulle is one of the largest commissioned warships in the European Union.

The combined component strength of member states' naval forces is about 514 commissioned warships. Of those in service, 4 are fleet carriers. The EU also has 4 amphibious assault ships and 20 amphibious support ships in service. Of the EU's 49 submarines, 10 are nuclear-powered submarines while 39 are conventional attack submarines.

Operation Atalanta (formal name: European Union Naval Force Somalia) is the first ever (and still ongoing) naval operation of the European Union. It is part of a larger EU action in the Horn of Africa to address the Somali crisis. As of January 2011, twenty-three EU nations participate in the operation.

France and Italy have blue-water navies.

Guide to table:

- Ceremonial vessels, research vessels, supply vessels, training vessels, and icebreakers are not included.
- The table only counts warships that are commissioned (or equivalent) and active.
- Surface vessels displacing less than 200 tonnes are not included, regardless of other characteristics.
- The "amphibious support ship" category includes amphibious transport docks and dock landing ships, and tank landing ships.
- Frigates over 6,000 tonnes are classified as destroyers.
- The "patrol vessel" category includes missile boats.
- The "anti-mine ship" category includes mine countermeasures vessels, minesweepers and minehunters.
- Generally, total tonnage of ships is more important than total number of ships, as it gives a better indication of capability.

Member state	Fleet carrier	Amphibious assault ship	Amphibious support ship	Destroyer	Frigate	Corvette	Patrol vessel	Anti-mine ship	Missile sub.	Attack sub.	Total	Tonnage
Austria											0	0
Belgium					2		2	5			9	10,009
Bulgaria			1		4	3	1	10			18	15,160
Croatia							5	2			7	2,869
Cyprus							5				5	0
Czech Republic											0	0
Denmark				5	4		9				18	51,235
Estonia							2	4			6	3,633.5
Finland						4	4	12			20	5,429
France	1 (Note: Aircraft carrier Charles de Gaulle)	3		13	11		20	18	4	6	76	319,195
Germany				3	7	5	8	15		6	44	82,790
Greece			9		13		33	4		11	70	138,565
Hungary											0	0
(Republic of Ireland) Ireland							8				8	11,219
Italy	2 (Note: Aircraft carrier Cavour; New universal ship of Trieste has the function of aircraft carrier and amphibious assault ship.)	(1) (Note: New universal ship of Trieste has the function of aircraft carrier and amphibious assault ship.)	3 (Note: San Giorgio-class amphibious transport dock)	4	16	5	11	10		8	59	303,411
Latvia								5			5	3,025
Lithuania							4	4			8	5,678
Luxembourg											0	0
Malta							2				2	1,419
Netherlands			2	4	2		4	6		4	22	116,308
Poland			5		2	1	3	19		3	28	19,724
Portugal					5	7	7			2	23	34,686
Romania					3	7	6	5			21	23,090
Slovakia											0	0
Slovenia							1	1			2	435
Spain	1 (Note: Spain withdrew last classic aircraft carrier Príncipe de Asturias in 2013 (currently in reserve). New universal ship of Juan Carlos I has the function of fleet carrier and amphibious assault ship.)	(1)	2 (Note: Galicia-class landing platform dock)	5 (Note: F-100 class)	6 (Note: Santa María class)		23	6		3	46	148,607
Sweden						6		11		5	22	14,256
(European Union) EU	4	4	22	34	75	38	156	136	4	48	~516	~1,309,110

==== Land forces ====
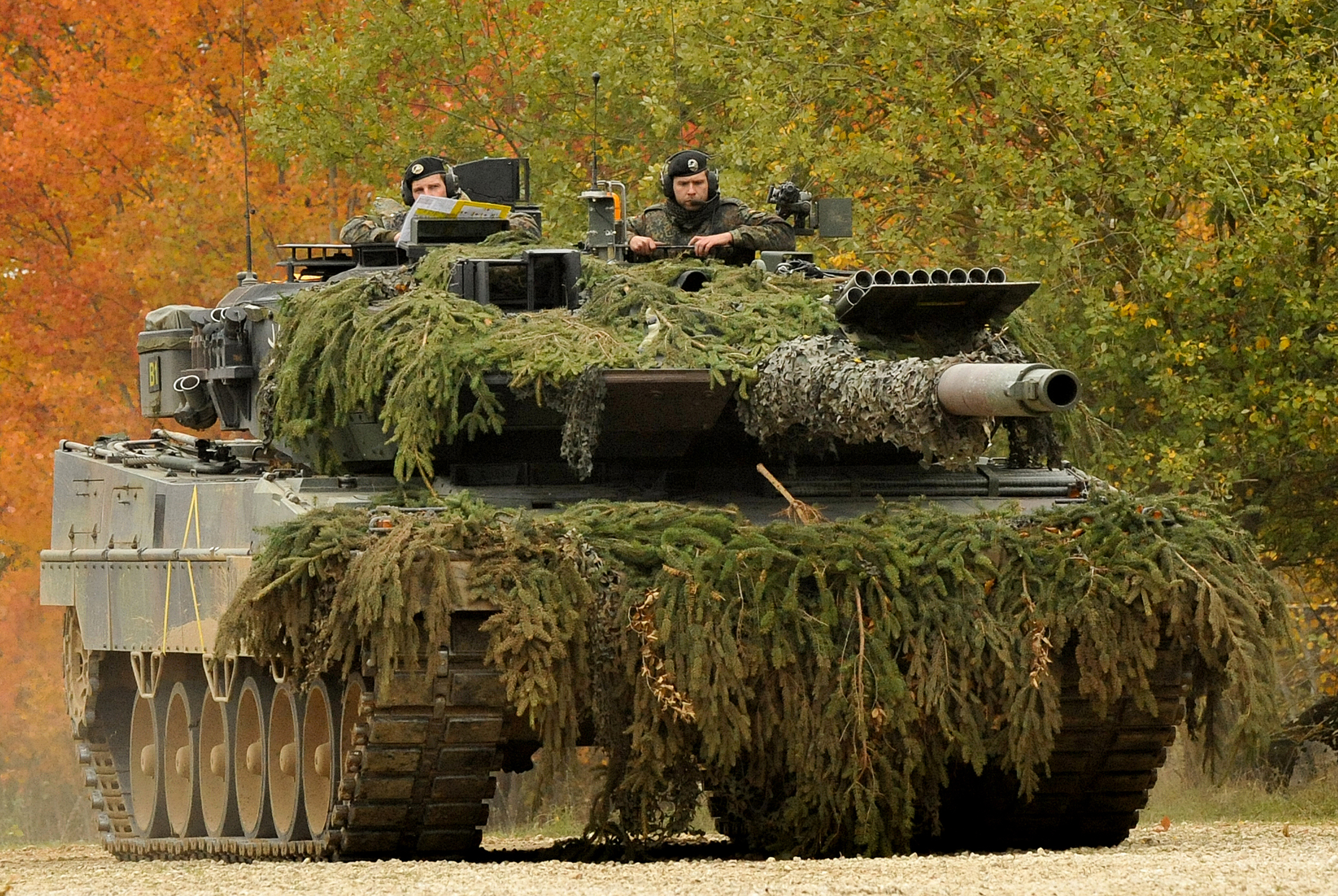
The Leopard 2 main battle tank

Combined, the member states of the European Union maintain large numbers of various land-based military vehicles and weaponry.

Guide to table:

- The table is not exhaustive and primarily includes vehicles and EU-NATO member countries under the Conventional Armed Forces in Europe Treaty (CFE treaty). Unless otherwise specified.
- The CFE treaty only includes vehicles stationed within Europe; vehicles overseas on operations are not counted.
- The "main battle tank" category also includes tank destroyers (such as the Italian B1 Centauro) or any self-propelled armoured fighting vehicle capable of heavy firepower. According to the CFE treaty.
- The "armoured fighting vehicle" category includes any armoured vehicle primarily designed to transport infantry and equipped with an automatic cannon of at least 20 mm calibre. According to the CFE treaty.
- The "artillery" category includes self-propelled or towed howitzers and mortars of 100 mm calibre and above. Other types of artillery are not included regardless of characteristics. According to the CFE treaty.
- The "attack helicopter" category includes any rotary-wing aircraft armed and equipped to engage targets or equipped to perform other military functions (such as the Apache or the Wildcat). According to the CFE treaty.
- The "military logistics vehicle" category includes logistics trucks of 4-tonne, 8-tonne, 14-tonne or larger, purposely designed for military tasking. Not under the CFE treaty.

Member state	Main battle tank	Armoured fighting vehicle	Artillery	Attack helicopter	Military logistics vehicle
Austria	56	364	90		
Belgium		521	155	27	
Bulgaria	362	681	1,035	12	
Croatia	75	283	127	10	
Cyprus	134	169	234	15	398
Czech Republic	123	501	182	24	
Denmark	46	229	56	12	
Estonia			74		
Finland	200	1,080	722	25	
France	450	6,256	349	283	10,746
Germany	815	1,774	401	158	
Greece	1,622	2,187	1,920	29	
Hungary	90	634	35	8	471
(Republic of Ireland) Ireland		107	36		
Italy	1,176	3,145	1,446	107	10,921
Latvia					
Lithuania		88	96		
Luxembourg					
Malta					
Netherlands	16	634	135	21	
Poland	1,675	3,110	1,580	83	
Portugal	220	425	377		
Romania	857	1,272	1,273	23	
Slovakia	30	327	68		
Slovenia	76	52	63		
Spain	484	1,007	811	27	
Sweden	120	978	268		
(European Union) EU	8,413	25,421	11,259	822	

==== Air forces ====
The air forces of EU member states operate a wide range of military systems and hardware. This is primarily due to each member state's independent requirements and the national defence industries of some member states. However, such programmes like the Eurofighter Typhoon and Eurocopter Tiger have seen many European nations design, build and operate a single weapons platform. Member states developed and manufactured 60% of the overall combat fleet; 32% were US-origin, but some were assembled in Europe, and the remaining 8% were Soviet-made aircraft. As of 2014, it is estimated that the European Union had around 2,000 serviceable combat aircraft (fighter aircraft and ground-attack aircraft).

The EU's airlift capabilities evolved with the introduction of the Airbus A400M (another example of EU defence cooperation). The A400M is a tactical airlifter with strategic capabilities. Around 140 were initially expected to be operated by 5 member states (Luxembourg, France, Germany, Spain and Belgium).

Guide to tables:

- The tables are sourced from figures provided by Flight International for the year 2020.
- Aircraft are grouped into three main types (indicated by colours): red for combat aircraft, green for aerial refueling aircraft, and yellow for strategic and tactical transport aircraft.
- The two "other" columns include additional aircraft according to their type, sorted by colour (i.e. the "other" category in red includes combat aircraft, while the "other" category in grey includes both aerial refuelling and transport aircraft). This was done because it was not feasible to allocate every aircraft type its own column.
- Other aircraft such as trainers, helicopters, UAVs and reconnaissance or surveillance aircraft are not included in the below tables or figures.

Fighter and ground-attack

Member state	Typhoon	Gripen	Rafale	Mirage 2000	Tornado	F-35	F-16	F/A-18	Other	Total
Austria	15									15
Belgium						12 (22 ordered)	44			56
Bulgaria							2 (14 ordered)		12 MiG-29; 7 Su-25	21
Croatia			12							12
Cyprus										
Czech Republic		14				(24 ordered)			24 L-159 11 L-39/NG	49
Denmark						20 (23 ordered)	36			56
Estonia										
Finland						(64 ordered)		60		60
France			146 (114 ordered)	83						229
Germany	127 (58 ordered)				65 IDS & 21 Tornado ECR	(35 ordered)				213
Greece			24	24		(40 ordered)	152		17 F-4	217
Hungary		14 (4 ordered)								14
(Republic of Ireland) Ireland										
Italy	88 (24 ordered)				23 IDS & 12 Tornado ECR	38 (57 ordered)			12 Harrier II	173
Latvia										
Lithuania										
Luxembourg										
Malta										
Netherlands						46 (12 ordered)				46
Poland						3 (29 ordered)	47		12 T-50 (36 ordered); 28 MiG-29	90
Portugal							25			25
Romania						(32 ordered)	34 (23 ordered)			34
Slovakia							7 (5 ordered)			7
Slovenia										
Spain	67 (45 ordered)							81	12 Harrier II	160
Sweden		96 (68 ordered)								96
(European Union) EU	297 (127)	124 (72)	182 (114)	107	121	119 (338)	347 (42)	141	135	1573

Aerial refueling and transport

Member state	A330 MRTT	KC-130	KC-767	A400M	C-130	CN-235C-295	C-27J	C-390	L-410	Other	Total
Austria					3			(4 ordered)		8 PC-6	11
Belgium				7							7
Bulgaria							3		2	1 PC-12	6
Croatia											
Cyprus											
Czech Republic						6		(2 ordered)	6		12
Denmark					4						4
Estonia										2 An-28/M28	2
Finland						2				3 Learjet 35 6 PC-12NG	11
France	13	2		24 (30 ordered)	15	27				1 A330; 5 DHC-6; 25 TBM 700; 5 PC-6; 10 EMB-121; 6 Falcon 10	133
Germany		3		50 (3 ordered)	3					2 A321	55
Greece					6		8			3 King Air 350	17
Hungary								1 (1 ordered)		2 A319	3
(Republic of Ireland) Ireland						3				4 PC-12NG	7
Italy		4	4		9		10			16 P180	43
Latvia											
Lithuania							3	(3 ordered)	2		5
Luxembourg				1							1
Malta										1 BNT-2; 3 King Air 200	4
Netherlands					4			(5 ordered)			4
Poland					5	16				37 An-28	58
Portugal					4	11		3 (3 ordered)		1 Falcon 900	19
Romania					5		7			1 An-26	13
Slovakia							2	(3 ordered)	6		8
Slovenia							2		1	2 PC-6	5
Spain	1			14 (13 ordered)		28 (16 ordered)				7 C212; 6 Citation V 3 King Air 90	59
Sweden		1			5			(4 ordered)		2 Saab 340	8
Shared within EU part of MMF	9 (4 ordered)									3 C-17	12
(European Union) EU	23 (4)	10	4	96 (46)	63	93 (16)	35	4 (25)	17	165	510

=== Multinational ===
==== Established at Union level ====
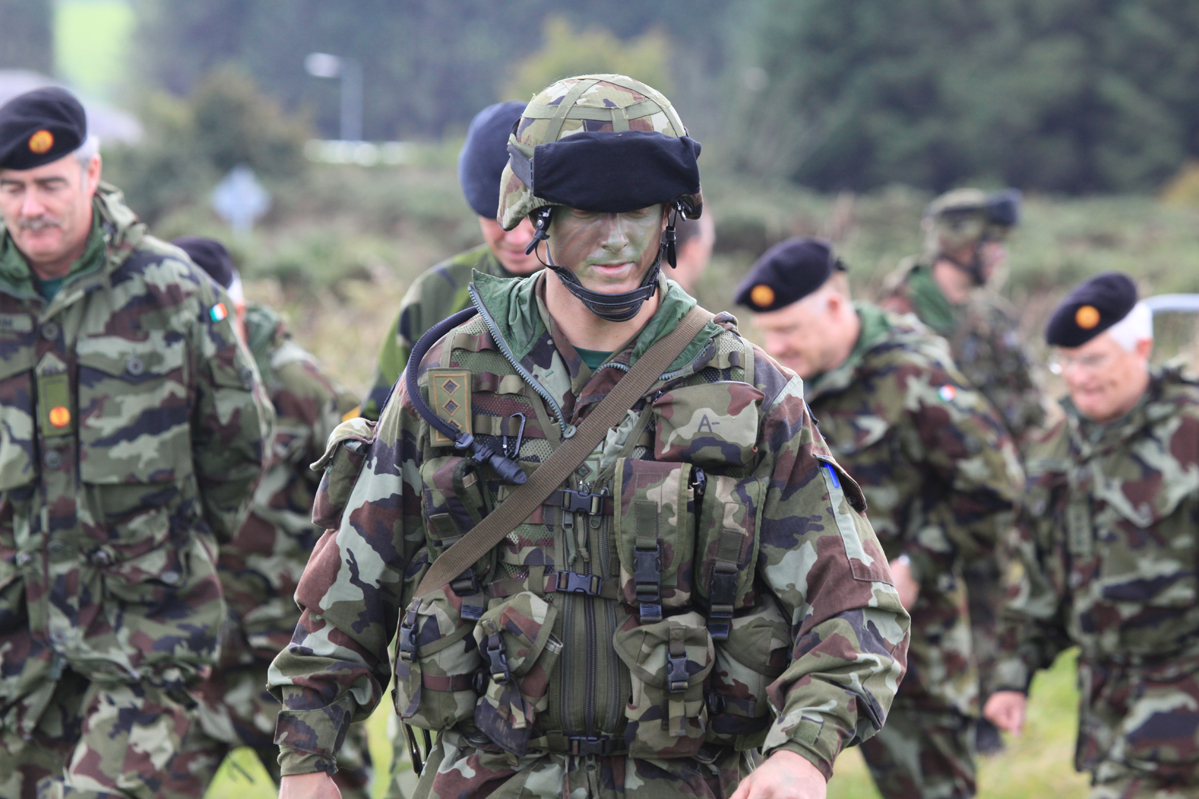
Irish Army personnel from the Nordic Battle Group at an exercise in 2010

The Helsinki Headline Goal Catalogue lists rapid reaction forces composed of 60,000 troops managed by the European Union but controlled by the countries that provide troops.

Forces introduced at Union level include:

- The battle groups (BG) adhere to the CSDP, and are based on contributions from a coalition of member states. Each of the eighteen Battlegroups consists of a battalion-sized force (1,500 troops) reinforced with combat support elements. The groups rotate actively, so that two are ready for deployment at all times. The Council of the European Union directly controls the forces. The Battlegroups reached full operational capacity on 1 January 2007, although, by January 2013, they had yet to see any military action. They are based on existing ad hoc missions that the European Union (EU) has undertaken and has been described by some as a new "standing army" for Europe. The troops and equipment are drawn from the EU member states under a "lead nation". In 2004, United Nations Secretary-General Kofi Annan welcomed the plans and emphasised the value and importance of the Battlegroups in helping the UN deal with trouble spots.
- The Medical Command (EMC) is a planned medical command centre in support of EU missions, formed as part of the Permanent Structured Cooperation (PESCO). The EMC will provide the EU with a permanent medical capability to support operations abroad, including medical resources and a rapidly deployable medical task force. The EMC will also provide medical evacuation facilities, triage and resuscitation, treatment and holding of patients until they can be returned to duty, and emergency dental treatment. It will also contribute to harmonising medical standards, certification and legal (civil) framework conditions.
- The Force Crisis Response Operation Core (EUFOR CROC) is a flagship defence project under development as part of Permanent Structured Cooperation (PESCO). EURFOR CROC will contribute to creating a "full spectrum force package" to speed up the provision of military forces and the EU's crisis management capabilities. Rather than creating a standing force, the project involves creating a concrete catalogue of military force elements that would speed up establishing a force when the EU decides to launch an operation. It is land-focused and aims to generate a force of 60,000 troops from the contributing states alone. While it does not establish any form of "European army", it foresees a deployable, interoperable force under a single command. Germany is the lead country for the project, but the French are heavily involved, and it is tied to President Emmanuel Macron's proposal to create a standing intervention force. The French see it as an example of what PESCO is about.

==== Provided through Article 42.3 TEU ====
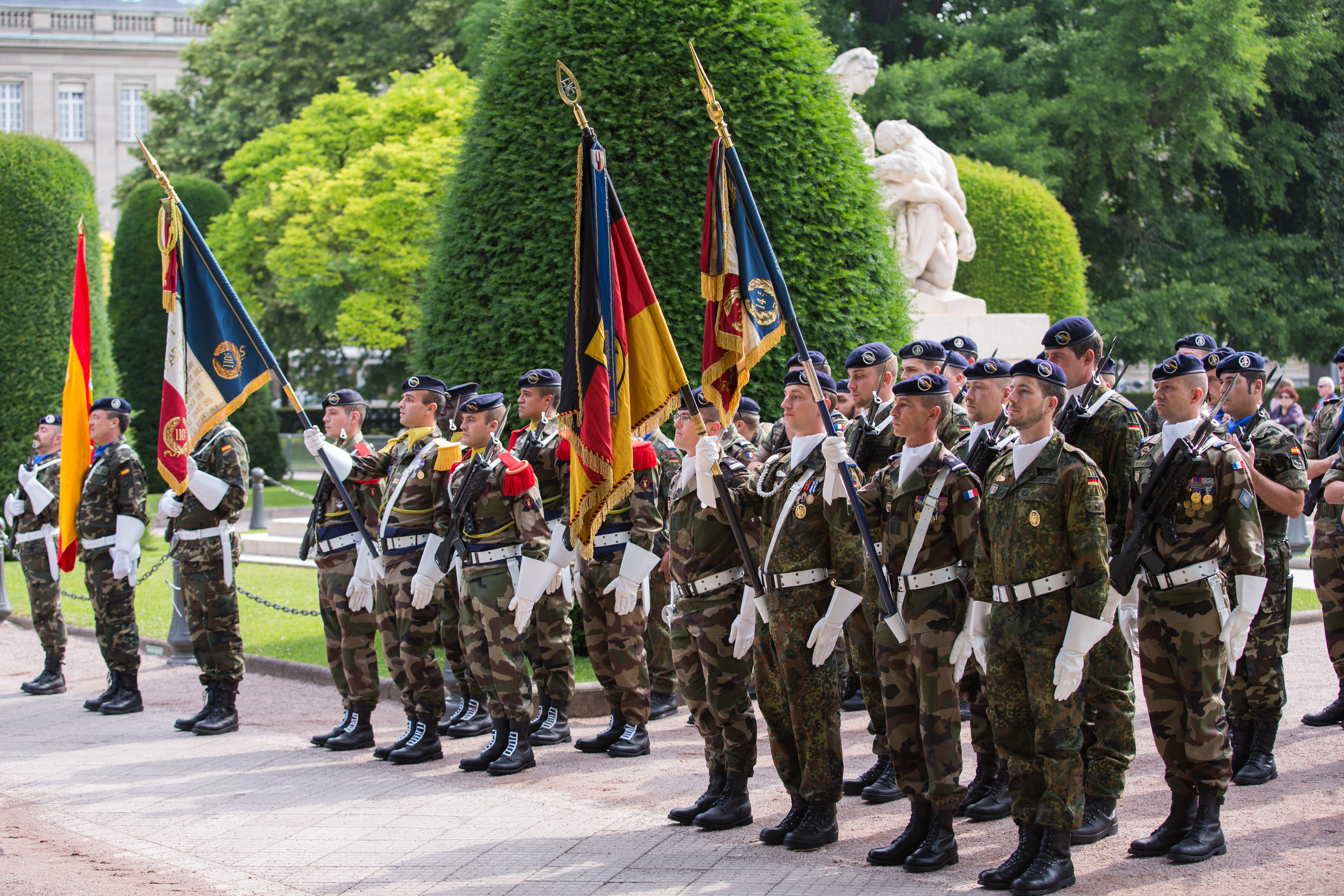
Personnel of the European Corps in Strasbourg, France, during a change of command ceremony in 2013

This section presents an incomplete list of forces and bodies established intergovernmentally amongst a subset of member states. These organisations will deploy forces based on the collective agreement of their member states. They are typically technically listed as being able to be deployed under the auspices of NATO, the United Nations, the European Union (EU) through Article 42.3 of TEU, the Organization for Security and Co-operation in Europe, or any other international entity.

However, except for the Eurocorps, very few have been deployed in any real military operation, and none under the CSDP at any point in its history.

Land Forces:

- The Eurocorps is an army corps of approximately 1,000 soldiers stationed in Strasbourg, France. Based in the French city of Strasbourg, the corps is the nucleus of the Franco-German Brigade.
- The I. German/Dutch Corps is a multinational formation consisting of units from the Dutch and German armies. Due to its role as a NATO High Readiness Forces Headquarters, soldiers from other NATO member states, the United States, Denmark, Norway, Spain, Italy, the United Kingdom, amongst others, are also stationed at Münster.
- The Multinational Corps Northeast, a Danish-German-Polish multinational corps
- The European Gendarmerie Force, an intervention force with militarised police functions which specialises in crisis management.

Aerial:

- The European Air Transport Command exercises operational control of the majority of the aerial refueling capabilities and military transport fleets of its participating nations. Based at Eindhoven Airbase in the Netherlands, the command also has limited responsibility for exercises, aircrew training, and harmonising relevant national air transport regulations. The command was established in 2010 to provide a more efficient management of the participating nations' assets and resources in this field.

Naval:

- The European Maritime Force (EUROMARFOR or EMF) is a non-standing, military force that may carry out naval, air and amphibious operations, with an activation time of 5 days after an order is received. The force was formed in 1995 to fulfil missions defined in the Petersberg Declaration, such as sea control, humanitarian missions, peacekeeping operations, crisis response operations, and peace enforcement.

== Participation, relationship with NATO ==
EU and NATO memberships are distinct, and some EU member states are traditionally neutral on defence issues. Of the 27 EU member states, 23 are also NATO members. Four non-NATO member states are EU members: Austria, Cyprus, Ireland, and Malta. Another four NATO members are EU applicants—Albania, Montenegro, North Macedonia and Turkey. Two others—Iceland and Norway—have opted to remain outside of the EU, but participate in the EU's single market. Several EU member states were formerly members of the Warsaw Pact. Denmark had an opt-out from the CSDP, but voted in a referendum in 2022 to begin participating in the policy area.

Non-European countries
Transcontinental countries

Comparison of the two main Euro-Atlantic defence organisations
	European Union (in respect of its defence arm, the Common Security and Defence Policy)		NATO
Mutual defence clause	Article 42.7 of the consolidated version of the Treaty on European Union: "If a Member State is the victim of armed aggression on its territory, the other Member States shall have towards it an obligation of aid and assistance by all the means in their power, in accordance with Article 51 of the United Nations Charter. This shall not prejudice the specific character of the security and defence policy of certain Member States. [...]"		Article 5 of the North Atlantic Treaty: "The Parties agree that an armed attack against one or more of them [on their territory] shall be considered an attack against them all and consequently they agree that, if such an armed attack occurs, each of them, in exercise of the right of individual or collective self-defence recognised by Article 51 of the Charter of the United Nations, will assist the Party or Parties so attacked by taking forthwith, individually and in concert with the other Parties, such action as it deems necessary, including the use of armed force, to restore and maintain the security of the North Atlantic area. [...]"
	Political strategic organisation		
Highest office	High Representative (HR/VP)		Secretary General
Principal decision-making body	Foreign Affairs Council		North Atlantic Council
Liaison body	European External Action Service		International Staff
Seat	Kortenberg building (Brussels, Belgium)		NATO headquarters (Brussels, Belgium)
	Military strategic organisation		
Supreme commander	Director of the Military Planning and Conduct Capability		Supreme Allied Commander Europe
Headquarters	Military Planning and Conduct Capability (Brussels, Belgium)		Supreme Headquarters Allied Powers Europe (Mons, Belgium)
Chair of chiefs of defence assembly	Chairman of the European Union Military Committee		Chair of the NATO Military Committee
Chiefs of defence assembly	European Union Military Committee		NATO Military Committee
Advisory body	European Union Military Staff		International Military Staff
	EU Membership	Permanent Structured Cooperation	NATO Membership
Member states of both the EU and NATO
Belgium	Founder	Founder	Founder
Bulgaria	2007	Founder	2004
Croatia	2013	Founder	2009
Czech Republic	2004	Founder	1999
Denmark	1973	2023	Founder
Estonia	2004	Founder	2004
Finland	1995	Founder	2023
France	Founder	Founder	Founder
Germany	Founder	Founder	1955
Greece	1981	Founder	1952
Hungary	2004	Founder	1999
Italy	Founder	Founder	Founder
Latvia	2004	Founder	2004
Lithuania	2004	Founder	2004
Luxembourg	Founder	Founder	Founder
Netherlands	Founder	Founder	Founder
Poland	2004	Founder	1999
Portugal	1986	Founder	Founder
Romania	2007	Founder	2004
Slovakia	2004	Founder	2004
Slovenia	2004	Founder	2004
Spain	1986	Founder	1982
Sweden	1995	Founder	2024
Non-NATO EU member states
Austria	1995	Founder	Partnership for Peace
Cyprus	2004	Founder	No
Ireland	1973	Founder	Partnership for Peace
Malta	2004	No	Partnership for Peace
Non-EU NATO member states
Albania	Candidate	—N/a	2009
Iceland	No	—N/a	Founder
Montenegro	Candidate	—N/a	2017
North Macedonia	Candidate	—N/a	2020
Norway	Defence Agency agreement	—N/a	Founder
Turkey	Candidate	—N/a	1952
United Kingdom	1973–2020	—N/a	Founder
European countries outside both the EU and NATO
Andorra	No	—N/a	No
Armenia	No	—N/a	Individual Partnership Action Plan
Azerbaijan	No	—N/a	Individual Partnership Action Plan
Belarus	No	—N/a	Partnership for Peace
Bosnia and Herzegovina	Candidate	—N/a	Membership Action Plan
Georgia	Candidate	—N/a	Intensified Dialogue
Kazakhstan	No	—N/a	Individual Partnership Action Plan
Kosovo	Applicant / Potential candidate	—N/a	No
Liechtenstein	No	—N/a	No
Moldova	Candidate	—N/a	Individual Partnership Action Plan
Monaco	No	—N/a	No
Russia	No	—N/a	Partnership for Peace
San Marino	No	—N/a	No
Serbia	Candidate	—N/a	Individual Partnership Action Plan
Switzerland	Defence Agency agreement	—N/a	Partnership for Peace
Ukraine	Candidate	—N/a	Intensified Dialogue
Vatican City	No	—N/a	No
NATO member states located in North America, which are therefore ineligible for EU membership
Canada	—N/a	—N/a	Founder
United States	—N/a	—N/a	Founder
Members of NATO's Partnership for Peace located outside Europe, which are therefore neither eligible for EU nor NATO membership
Kyrgyzstan	—N/a	—N/a	Partnership for Peace
Tajikistan	—N/a	—N/a	Partnership for Peace
Turkmenistan	—N/a	—N/a	Partnership for Peace
Uzbekistan	—N/a	—N/a	Partnership for Peace

The Berlin Plus agreement is the short title of a comprehensive package of agreements made between NATO and the EU on 16 December 2002. These agreements were based on conclusions of NATO's 1999 Washington summit, sometimes referred to as the CJTF mechanism, and allowed the EU to draw on some of NATO's military assets in its own peacekeeping operations.

Chart presented in 2012 by then Director General of the Military Staff Lt. gen. Ton van Osch, asserting that the utility of the combined civilian and military components of the EU policy could be considered more effective than NATO for a limited level of conflict

== EUCAP Somalia ==
The EUCAP Somalia is an example of an unarmed, non-executive, civilian Common Security and Defence Policy (CSDP) Mission. aimed at strengthening maritime security capacities, police sector, as well as promoting the Rule of Law in Somalia. It provides strategic level advice, mentoring and training, on issues ranging from coast guard and police functions to police-prosecution cooperation and the drafting of laws. Initially launched as EUCAP Nestor in 2012, the mission was reconfigured to focus on Somalia, thus renamed by the Council of the European Union, EUCAP Somalia in 2016.

In December 2024, the Council of the European Union extended the Mission’s mandate to February 2027.

The Mission's main goals are to help Somalia build well-trained police forces in line with the Somali Transition Plan, help secure one of the EU’s vital maritime trade routes, and assist in drafting and implementing sound legislative frameworks, including accountability systems.

=== Background ===
The mission was established in response to the persistent challenges posed by maritime insecurity in the Western Indian Ocean, particularly piracy, illegal fishing, human trafficking, and arms smuggling. These issues severely affected both Somalia's security and the region's economic stability. Somalia’s extensive coastline (the longest in mainland Africa) remained unprotected for years after the government collapsed in the early 1990s. Piracy flourished in the absence of effective maritime governance, leading to international efforts to assist the country in reclaiming control over its waters. EUCAP Somalia emerged as part of these efforts, complementing other international missions such as Operation Atalanta and EUTM Somalia.

=== Mandates ===
==== From 2012 to 2016 ====
EUCAP Nestor's mandate has two objectives: strengthening the maritime capacities of beneficiary countries (excluding Somalia) and training a coastal police force and judges in Somalia, with the primary aim of getting countries in the region to work together to strengthen action at sea. EUCAP Nestor operates in five countries: Djibouti, Kenya, Seychelles, Somalia (Puntland/Somaliland) and Tanzania. This is why it is relatively large in terms of staff numbers, with almost 200 people spread across the different countries. These experts provide legal, strategic and operational advice on maritime safety.

==== From 2016 to 2021 ====
When the name changed in December 2016, so did the mandate. EUCAP Somalia dropped its regional ambitions and focused solely on Somalia, specifically on the Coast Guard, to strengthen ‘Somali maritime law enforcement capabilities’. The mandate is not limited to piracy; it covers any criminal activity or offence committed on the coast or at sea.

==== From 2021 to 2024 ====
In December 2020, the Council of the European Union extended EUCAP's mandate until 31 December 2024. From 2021 onwards, the mission will also be helping Somalia to strengthen its police capabilities, in particular by developing the Federal Darwish police force and reinforcing the INTERPOL National Central Bureau in Mogadishu. The EU's budget for the period 2023-2024 allocated is 81 million €.

Current mandate from 2025 to 2027

In December 2024, the Council of the European Union extended the Mission’s mandate to February 2027. EUCAP Somalia is tasked with advising, training, and equipping the Somali Police Force and supporting the development of a legal framework for Somalia’s internal security architecture. The mission’s work also includes providing monitoring support to regional maritime police forces, including the Somaliland and Puntland Maritime Police Forces, to bolster maritime law enforcement and security. The Mission’s budget for its current mandate is €110 million and total staff of 169 members.

=== Three pillars of EUCAP Somalia ===
The three pillars of EUCAP Somalia are:

1. Support the development of Somali Police Forces by enhancing their capabilities through advising, training and equipping Somali Police Forces in line with the Somali Security Sector Development Plan, ensuring the police are better prepared to maintain security and stability across the country.
2. Strengthen Maritime Police Capacities in and around the three main Somali ports (Mogadishu, Berbera and Bossaso) by providing capacity building on coast guard functions.
3. Promote the rule of law by working with Somali authorities to enhance accountability within the police force and across the criminal justice chain. This includes supporting the development of legal frameworks needed for law enforcement and security actors to function effectively in both land and maritime domains, fostering governance and accountability.

=== Achievements ===
Since its reconfiguration in 2016, EUCAP Somalia has made significant strides in enhancing Somalia’s maritime security capabilities. Recent achievements include improving the Somali Police Force's (SPF) command, control, and communication capabilities, as well as enhancing its ability to manage security incidents in Mogadishu. EUCAP has deployed a specialised multinational team to support the SPF's Maritime Police Unit and has played a key role in developing Somaliland’s Coast Guard, conducting joint exercises with EUNAVFOR Operation ATALANTA. The mission also trained and equipped the Puntland Maritime Police Force, enhancing their capacity to enforce maritime law. Additionally, EUCAP has supported the Somali Attorney General’s Maritime Crimes Unit by providing training in internal procedures and investigations and launching an internship program for young lawyers. Despite this progress, Somalia continues to face challenges in maritime governance because of political instability and limited resources, but EUCAP remains committed to addressing these issues with Somali authorities and international partners.

Mission's achievements during mandate 2022 - 24:

- Increased the Somali Police Force's command, control and communication capability.
- Trained Somali Police Force trainers for co-training activities.
- Enabled the establishment of the Maritime Rescue and Coordination Centre in Mogadishu to enhance maritime security coordination along the Somali coastline and in regional waters.
- Supported the development of the Somaliland Coast Guard, including through joint exercises with EUNAVFOR Operation ATALANTA and the provision of maritime equipment.
- Trained mobile training units for Somaliland Coast Guard and Somaliland Police.
- Trained and equipped the Puntland Maritime Police Force - Maritime Police Unit, enhancing their law enforcement capabilities.
- Supported the maritime crimes unit of the Somali Attorney General's Office in internal procedures and maritime crimes investigations, as well as an internship program for young lawyers in Mogadishu and Puntland.

== See also ==
- European Union–NATO relations
- European Union as an emerging superpower
- Security and defence partnerships of the European Union
- European countries by military expenditure as a percentage of government expenditure
- Neutral country § European Union
- Strategic Compass for Security and Defence

=== Defence-related EU initiatives ===
- Military Mobility
- European Centre of Excellence for Countering Hybrid Threats (Hybrid CoE), an EU-supported intergovernmental think-tank
- List of military and civilian missions of the European Union

=== Pan-European defence organisations (intergovernmental) ===
- Finabel, an organisation, controlled by the army chiefs of staff of its participating nations, that promotes cooperation and interoperability between the armies.
- Organisation for Joint Armament Cooperation (OCCAR), an organisation that facilitates and manages collaborative armament programmes through their lifecycle between its participating nations.
- European Air Group (EAG), an organisation that promotes cooperation and interoperability between the air forces of its participating nations.
- European Organisation of Military Associations and Trade Unions (EUROMIL)
- European Personnel Recovery Centre (EPRC), an organisation that contributes to the development and harmonisation of policies and standards related to personnel recovery.
- European Intervention Initiative
- European Centre of Excellence for Civilian Crisis Management

=== Regional, intergovernmental defence organisations in Europe ===
- Nordic Defence Cooperation (NORDEFCO)
- Central European Defence Cooperation (CEDC)

=== Atlanticist intergovernmental defence organisations ===
- North Atlantic Treaty Organisation (NATO)
- Movement Coordination Centre Europe (MCCE), an organisation aiming to coordinate the use of airlift, sealift and land movement assets owned or leased by participating nations.
