= Helsinki Headline Goal =

Military capability target for 2003

The Helsinki Headline Goal was a military capability target set for 2003 during the December 1999 Helsinki European Council meeting with the aim of developing a future European Rapid Reaction Force. There was much interest in the idea of a single EU military force, and inexact characterisations of the initiative (which was not much more than some headquarters arrangements and a list of theoretically available national forces) led to imprecise journalistic depictions about a unified European army.

The Headline Goal was built upon an earlier bilateral Franco-British Joint Declaration adopted at St. Malo in December 1998. The St. Malo Declaration said that the European Union ought to have the capability for “autonomous action backed up by credible military forces” as part of a common defence policy. The St. Malo Declaration laid the political foundation between France and the United Kingdom, which in turn facilitated the launch of the European Security and Defence Policy and the formulation of the Headline Goal.

In 2004, a new target was set: the Headline Goal 2010. To update the initial declaration in December 1999, the formal agreement on the Headline Goal was reached on 22 November 2004 and according to statements made by EU officials the first units will be deployable in 2007. Since 1 January 2007, 60,000 soldiers have been available for a possible European Rapid Reaction Force who are potentially able to be deployed for at least a year.

== Headline Goal 2003 ==
Under this plan, the European Union pledged itself during the Helsinki summit to be able to deploy rapidly and then sustain forces capable of the full range of Petersberg tasks (as set out in the Amsterdam Treaty), including the most demanding, in operations up to corps level (up to 15 brigades or 50,000-60,000 persons) to be capable of intervening in any crisis that could occur in an area where European interests are affected. The aim was to make those forces self-reliant, able to deploy within 60 days and over 4,000 km (2,485 mi), and sustainable in the field for a year. This means the force would actually have to number around 180,000 troops so as to provide rotating replacements for the initial forces. The Petersberg tasks include humanitarian and rescue tasks; peacekeeping tasks; and tasks of combat forces in crisis management, including peacemaking. EU-led forces assembled in response to a crisis would last only for the duration of the crisis and it would be up to the member states themselves to decide whether, when and how to contribute troops.

The Petersberg tasks, which outline the duties of the ERRF, have been expanded from humanitarian, rescue, and peacekeeping and peacemaking to include 'joint disarmament operation', 'military advice and assistance tasks' and 'post-conflict stabilisation'. It also states that, "all these tasks may contribute to the fight against terrorism, including by supporting third countries in combating terrorism in their territories."

=== Headline Force Catalogue ===
From the Petersberg task scenarios envisaged, the EU Military Staff generated the "Helsinki Headline Catalogue" which specifies which capabilities are required in each of 144 capability areas. In November 2000, the European Union held a Capabilities Commitment Conference in Brussels, which elicited commitments for over 100,000 (existing) troops that were declared available for what became known as the Helsinki Force Catalogue. A year later, a Capabilities Improvement Conference was held during which further military forces and 5,000 police were added to the catalogue.

=== European Capability Action Plan ===
During the December 2001 Laeken summit, the EU launched the European Capabilities Action Plan (ECAP) to remedy European capability shortfalls. It involved initially some 20 panels composed of military experts from the member states which put forward plans and proposals to fill the identified shortfalls (e.g., by acquiring new equipment or optimising existing capabilities, in particular through cooperation at European level).

== Headline Goal 2010 ==
As the Helsinki Headline Goal became fulfilled, the European Council of June 2004 approved to further develop the EU's military crisis management capability and a new target was set: the "Headline Goal 2010". EU members made the commitment that by the year 2010, at the latest, they would be capable of responding "with swift and decisive action applying a fully coherent approach" to the whole spectrum of crisis management operations covered by the Treaty of the EU and the 2003 EU Security Strategy (i.e. humanitarian and rescue tasks, disarmament operations, support to third countries in combating terrorism, peacekeeping tasks and tasks of combat forces in crisis management, and peacemaking). The EU also aims to address the shortfalls from the previous headline goal (e.g. gaps related to strategic airlift and sealift) which are still considered to be a limiting factor to the operability of the designated forces, especially in more demanding crisis management operations.

== See also ==
- Eurocorps
- European Gendarmerie Force
- European Union rapid reaction mechanism
- European Security and Defence Policy
- Berlin Plus agreement
