= EI2 =

EI2 may refer to:

- Encyclopaedia of Islam
- Enterprise Innovation Institute at the Georgia Institute of Technology
- European Intervention Initiative
