= Rapid reaction force =

Military or police unit capable of quickly responding to emergencies

A rapid reaction force / rapid response force (RRF), quick reaction force / quick response force (QRF), immediate reaction force (IRF), rapid deployment force (RDF), or quick maneuver force (QMF) is a military unit capable of responding to emergencies in a very short time frame.

== Definition ==
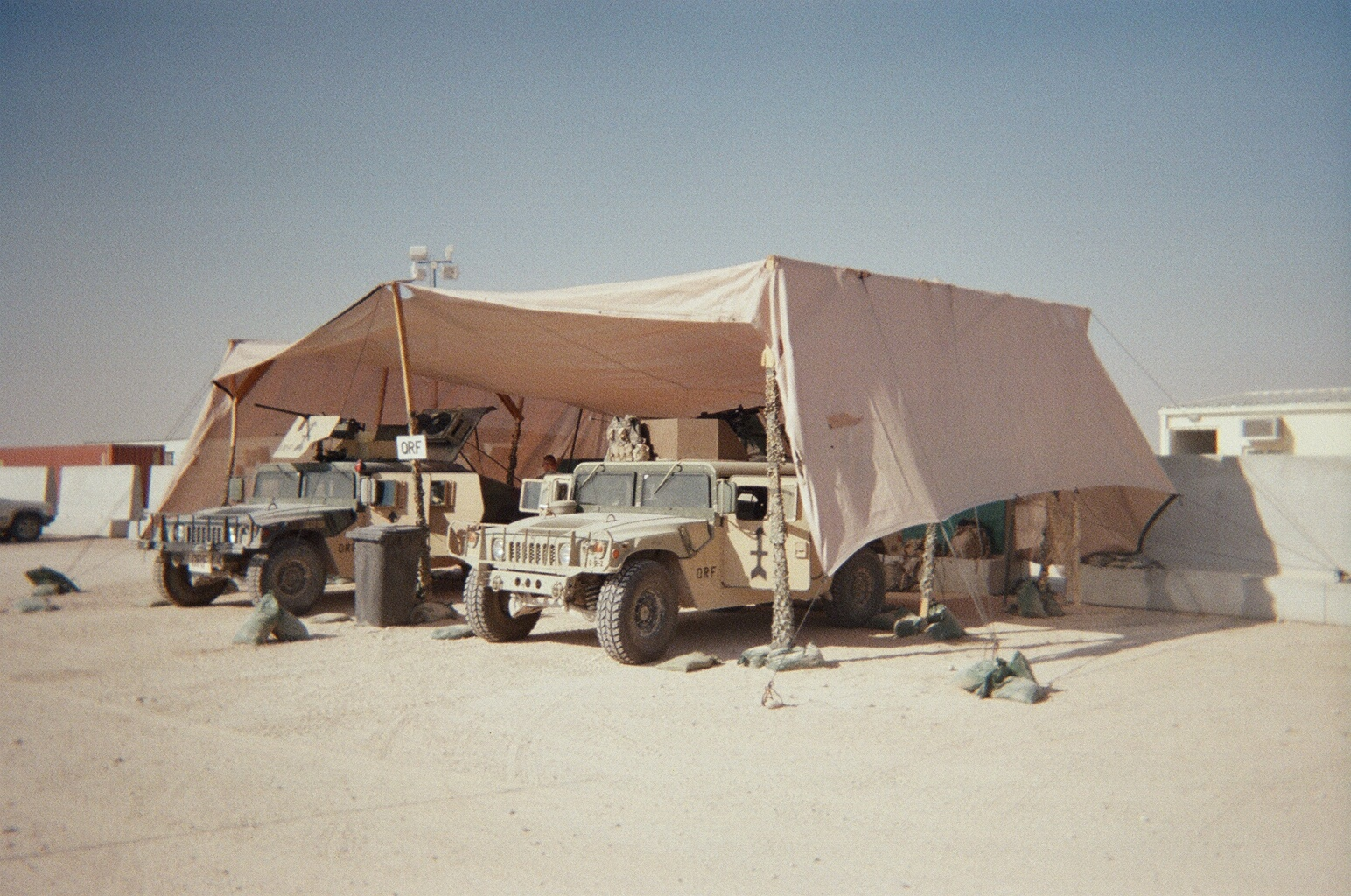
A United States Army quick reaction force staging area at Camp Buehring, Kuwait, in 2005

A quick reaction force (QRF) is an armed military unit capable of rapidly responding to developing situations. They are equipped to respond to any type of emergency within a short time frame, sometimes only a few minutes, based on unit standard operating procedures (SOPs). Some can deploy outside their borders and without the need for a large organized support force. A quick reaction force belongs directly to the commander of the unit it is created from and is typically held in the reserve. QRF units can be assigned to an area of operations (AO) or can be associated with a specific operation, for example Neptune Spear, when reserve units were used to support the main force following the crash of a helicopter.

== Selected examples ==
=== Active ===
- Albania: Rapid Reaction Brigade
- Argentina: Argentine Rapid Deployment Force
- Australia: 7th Brigade (High-readiness combined arms Brigade)
- Canada
  - Global Response Task Force
  - Canadian Army High Readiness Forces
    - 3rd Battalion, Royal Canadian Regiment
    - 3e Battalion, Royal 22e Régiment
    - Immediate Response Units
  - Disaster Assistance Response Team
- Colombia: Rapid Deployment Force
- Egypt: Egyptian Rapid Deployment Forces
- Finland: Finnish Rapid Deployment Force
- / Germany/Netherlands: Rapid Forces Division-DSK
- India: Rapid Action Force
- Indonesia: Indonesian Air Force Quick Reaction Forces Command
- / Italy/NATO: NATO Rapid Deployable Corps – Italy
- Japan: Central Readiness Regiment
- Malaysia: Rapid Deployment Force
- Portugal: Rapid Reaction Brigade
- South Korea:
  - 2nd Quick Response Division
  - ROKMC Quick Maneuver Force
- United States:
  - United States Air Force
    - Immediate Response Force
    - Rapid Engineer Deployable Heavy Operational Repair Squadron Engineers
  - United States Army
    - Immediate Response Force
- NATO:
  - The Allied Rapid Reaction Corps (ARRC) is a capable of rapidly deploying a NATO headquarters for operations and crisis response.
  - The NATO Response Force (NRF) is distinct from ARRC as it comprises land, sea, air, and special forces units.

=== Proposed/Defunct ===
- The European Rapid Operational Force (EUROFOR) was a European rapid reaction force under the European Union and Western European Union, established in 1995 and composed of military units from Italy, France, Portugal, and Spain. EUROFOR was tasked with performing duties outlined in the Petersberg Tasks. EUROFOR deployed to Kosovo from 2000 to 2001, and North Macedonia as part of EUFOR Concordia in 2003. After being converted into an EU Battlegroup, EUROFOR was dissolved in 2012.
- The European Rapid Reaction Force (ERRF) was the intended result of the Helsinki Headline Goal. Though many media reports suggested the ERRF would be a European Union army, the Helsinki Headline Goal was little more than headquarters arrangements and a list of theoretically available national forces for a rapid reaction force.
- (United Kingdom) The Joint Rapid Reaction Force (JRRF) was a British Armed Forces capability concept created in 1999. The force was composed of units from all three branches of the British military, and was able to rapidly deploy anywhere in the world at short notice. However, the War in Afghanistan and 2003 invasion of Iraq siphoned British personnel and equipment, leaving the JRRF with insufficient forces. The JRRF was succeeded by the Combined Joint Expeditionary Force in 2010 and the Joint Expeditionary Force in 2014.
- The concept of a United Nations rapid reaction force was proposed in the mid-1990s by several commentators and officials, including Secretary-General Boutros Boutros-Ghali. The UN rapid reaction force would consist of personnel stationed in their home countries, but they would have the same training, equipment, and procedures, and would conduct joint exercises. The force would remain at high readiness at all times so as to quickly deploy them where necessary.
- The Rapid Deployment Joint Task Force (RDJTF) was a former United States Department of Defense joint task force. It was formed in 1979 as the Rapid Deployment Force (RDF), envisioned as a mobile force that could quickly deploy U.S. forces to any location outside the usual American deployment areas of Western Europe and East Asia, soon coming to focus on the Middle East. It was inactivated in 1983 and reorganized as the United States Central Command.

== See also ==
- Expeditionary warfare
- Power projection
