= European Union Global Strategy =

2016 doctrine of the European Union

The Global strategy for the foreign and security policy of the European Union, for short the European Union Global Strategy (EUGS), is the updated doctrine of the European Union to improve the effectiveness of the defence and security of the Union and its members states, the protection of civilians, cooperation between the member states' armed forces, management of immigration, crises etc. Adopted on 28 June 2016, it replaces the European Security Strategy of 2003.

The EUGS is complemented by a document titled Implementation Plan on Security and Defense (IPSD). The concept of strategic autonomy forms part of the European Union Global Strategy. It refers to the ability of the European Union to defend Europe and act militarily in its neighborhood without so much reliance on the United States. The idea behind strategic autonomy in so far as it informs the European Global Strategy is that Europeans collectively have the capability and the will to stand up for themselves from a security and defense perspective.

== See also ==
- Strategic Compass for Security and Defence
