= European Intervention Initiative =

Joint military project between 13 European countries

- Abbreviation: EI2
- Formation: 2018
- Headquarters: Paris
- Members: 13 armed forces

The European Intervention Initiative (EII) is a joint military project between 13 European countries outside of existing structures, such as the North Atlantic Treaty Organization (NATO) and the European Union's (EU) defence arm. EII is planned to operate a "light" permanent secretariat based on the network of military liaison officers with the French defence ministry.

It was launched with the signing on 25 June 2018 of a letter of intent by nine member states of the European Union. The EII does not fall within the institutional framework of the CSDP, but France has given assurances of the closest possible coordination between the EII and the Permanent Structured Cooperation.

It constitutes a first concretisation of the proposals formulated in September 2017 by Emmanuel Macron as part of his "Initiative for Europe" in defence matters, so that Europe equips itself with a common intervention force, a common defence budget, and a common doctrine to act.

== History ==
The Initiative was first proposed by French President Emmanuel Macron in his Sorbonne keynote in September 2017. Nine members signed a Letter of Intent to begin work on June 25, 2018. Finland joined the military project on November 7, 2018.

In December 2022, the annual meeting of the group was held in Norway. At the time, 13 countries had signed up. The joint communiqué observed the 2022 Russian invasion of Ukraine but did nothing more.

== Objectives and content ==
The long-term ambition carried by France is to create a common strategic culture. It has also come in reaction to what it has seen as watered-down previous EU initiatives, like the Battelgroups. The French Minister of the Armed Forces, Florence Parly, specifies that it is about developing among countries that are both militarily capable and politically willing habits of working together, of being able to prepare, so that if necessary they can intervene, where they decide, when they decide, on extremely varied scenarios. The German Federal Minister of Defence, Ursula von der Leyen, adds that "the goal is to create a forum, with states that have the same vision, that will analyse situations, that will have discussions early, when crises manifest in a region, and that, together, can also evolve a political will".

The French desire was to form a "hard core" ready to act very quickly if needed, as was the case in Mali where France mounted Operation Serval in a few days. Not all EII member states will necessarily participate in every operation.

It is not about creating a new pre-positioned rapid intervention force like those already existing within NATO (with the NRF) or the CSDP (with the Battlegroups), or bilaterally, for example between France and the United Kingdom (with the CJEF). The means provided will be composed to respond specifically to the needs of a crisis.

According to the text of the letter of intent, the initiative will focus on enhanced interaction in four main areas: strategic foresight and intelligence sharing, scenario development and planning, support for operations, and fourthly, lessons learned and doctrine. To this end, the armed forces of the signatory countries will notably proceed with officer exchanges, joint anticipation and planning exercises, doctrine sharing, and the drafting of joint intervention scenarios.

== Participating states ==
=== Initial participants ===
The nine states that signed the letter of intent on June 25, 2018, are Germany, Belgium, Denmark, Spain, Estonia, France, the Netherlands, Portugal, and the United Kingdom. Germany was initially reluctant, fearing that this new initiative would weaken those taken since 2016 within the CSDP (notably the European Defence Action Plan and Permanent Structured Cooperation). The Franco-German council of ministers meeting on June 19 at Meseberg Castle, near Berlin, allowed a positive response from its side.

The participation of the United Kingdom, in the process of withdrawing from the European Union, illustrates the British desire to remain leading partners in European security. Their participation, like that of the Danes who are not part of the CSDP, is made possible by the fact that the EII is outside the institutional framework of the European Union.

=== Enlargement ===
Between August 2018 and the end of 2019, four countries joined the EII: Finland, Sweden, Norway, and Italy. Finland confirmed, during the visit of French President Emmanuel Macron to Helsinki on August 30, 2018, its decision taken a few days earlier to join the European intervention initiative. Its accession was validated on November 7 by the nine defence ministers of the EII member countries. On 14 July 2019, the Minister of the Armed Forces, Florence Parly, announced that Sweden and Norway were applying to join the EII.

== Implementation ==
The French Armed Forces Headquarters was responsible for organizing the effective launch of the IEI by holding the first Military European Strategic Talks (MEST) and drafting a Memorandum of Understanding (MoU) by the end of 2018.

=== Ministerial meetings ===
The initiative was steered by periodic ministerial meetings. A first meeting took place in Paris in November 2018, a second in the Netherlands in September 2019.

=== European maritime security initiative in the Arabian-Persian Gulf ===
Eight EII participating states set up a maritime security operation in the Arabian-Persian Gulf at the end of 2019 (in English: European Maritime Awareness in the Strait of Hormuz or EMASoH). The initiative became operational in February 2020 with the on-site presence of a French ship and a Dutch one. Denmark also planned to send a frigate. This operation was not mounted within the CSDP framework.

== See also ==
- Common Security and Defence Policy of the European Union
  - Permanent Structured Cooperation
  - Defence forces of the European Union
- NATO
- Western Union
- Western European Union
- Lancaster House Treaties
  - Combined Joint Expeditionary Force
