= Directorate-General for Defence Industry and Space =

Directorate-General of the European Commission

The Directorate-General for Defence Industry and Space (DG DEFIS) is a department of the European Commission. It is under the control of the Commissioner for DEFIS, who is as of the Second von der Leyen Commission, Andrius Kubilius. As of June 2025, the Director-General of DEFIS was Timo Pesonen.

== Tasks ==
The directorate, established in 2020 under the von der Leyen I Commission and currently under the direction of Timo Pesonen, leads the European Commission's activities in the Defence Industry and Space sector. Some of its tasks were transferred from the Directorate-General for Internal Market, Industry, Entrepreneurship and SMEs (DG GROW).

In the area of Defence Industry, DEFIS is in charge of upholding the competitiveness and innovation of the European Defence industry by ensuring the evolution of an able European defence technological and industrial base.

In the area of Space DG DEFIS is in charge of implementing the EU Space programme consisting of the European Earth Observation Programme (Copernicus), the European Global Navigation Satellite System (Galileo) and the European Geostationary Navigation Overlay Service (EGNOS).

== EU Space Policy ==
DG DEFIS is notably responsible for implementing the EU Space programme, made up originally of the European Earth Observation Programme (Copernicus), the European Global Navigation Satellite System (Galileo) and the European Geostationary Navigation Overlay Service (EGNOS).

The EU Space programme is jointly implemented by EU Member States, the European Union Agency for the Space Programme (EUSPA), the European Space Agency (ESA), EUMETSAT and many other stakeholders, and aims to improve for the needs of EU citizens.

In February 2023, European legislators agreed on the launch of a third satellite constellation, IRIS² - Infrastructure for Resilience, Interconnectivity and Security by Satellite. IRIS² is the European Union’s futureproofing solution to enable enhanced communication capacities to governmental users, businesses, with high-speed internet broadband to counteract connectivity dead zones. Suggested by the European Commission in February 2022, IRIS² will offer an EU space-based secure connectivity system to broaden access worldwide to secure, low-cost satellite communication services, in addition to universal high-speed broadband across Europe as a future proofing safeguard against potential challenges.

In addition, to combat the threats of satellite congestion saturation and the risks they pose to potential space infrastructure, the EU has proposed an approach to satellite traffic management (STM) which would enhance its tracking and surveillance capabilities, and standardize sustainability and safety regulations for in-space satellite usage.

=== CASSINI space entrepreneurship initiative ===
A subset of the EU Space policy is the EU space entrepreneurship initiative, CASSINI, which was launched on January 25, 2022. Cassini Facility deploys a €1 billion investment for Venture Capital funds interested in investing in EU-based companies in the space sector. Investment opportunities under the CASSINI initiative allow for Finance, networking solutions as well as prizes and competitions. CASSINI is also a framework programme of EU space research, along with Horizon Europe.

Other CASSINI initiatives include In Orbit Demonstrations/In Orbit Validation services (IOD/IOV) where the Commission offers in-space testing opportunities to SMEs by providing payload allowance which grants simultaneous expositional and developmental interest to SMEs. In addition to IOD/IOV schemes, à flight ticket initiative organised by the DEFIS DG allows for the purchase of entire launch/delivery vehicles, especially launch vehicles from private space companies with payload allocated to SME/research materials.

The CASSINI Business Accelerator initiative provides intensive 6-month programmes to improve start-up and scale-up companies’ ability to achieve sustained commercial growth through coaching, training, events and seed funding

== EU Defence Industry ==
The European Commission aims to improve the European defence industry market competitiveness and innovation by supporting the European defence industry through multiple framework aids and initiatives.

=== Act in Support of Ammunition Production (ASAP) ===
In response to the 2022 Russian invasion of Ukraine, the European Commission proposed a legislation to increase collaborative ammunition and missile production within EU member states to answer the resulting increase in demand. The legislation, named Act in Support of Ammunition Production (ASAP) would allocate EUR 50 million euros to secure crucial resources to ammunition manufacturing, fund EU defence companies, address bottleneck logistical and production issues as well as continuous EU-level monitoring of available defence and ammunition resources to ensure efficient distribution of resources. ASAP complements the European Defence Industrial Reinforcement through Common Procurement Act (EDIRPA) which was proposed as an initial response to ammunition shortages which resulted from the conflict. As of July 2023, both pieces of legislation have yet to be voted on by the EU's legislative bodies.

=== Certified defence-related Enterprises Register (CERTIDER) ===
An additional resource under the DEFIS´s purview is the Certified Defence-related Enterprises Register (CERTIDER), which centralizes information about enterprises that are certified under Directive 2009/43/EC of the European Parliament and of the Council of 6 May 2009 (simplifying the terms and conditions for the transfers of defence-related products within the EU), certification authorities and details about the certificates.

== See also ==
- European Commissioner for Internal Market
- High Representative of the Union for Foreign Affairs and Security Policy
- European Union Agency for the Space Programme
- European Space Agency (non-EU body)
- Common Security and Defence Policy
  - European Defence Agency
