= European army =

Proposed army

A European army is a hypothetical army of the European Union that would supersede the Common Security and Defence Policy and would go beyond the proposed European Defence Union. Since no such unified army is currently established, defence is a matter for the member states individually. The member states are, however, bound by several obligations arising from international treaties, and they conduct several multinational initiatives.

== History ==
The idea of a European army was first discussed in the 1950s. It was proposed by France and would have consisted of the "inner six" countries (Belgium, France, Italy, Luxembourg, the Netherlands, and West Germany), in order to strengthen defence against the Soviet threat without directly rearming Germany in the wake of World War II. In 1952 the Treaty establishing the European Defence Community was signed but not ratified by the signatories.

However, during the Cold War, Western Europe relied on NATO for defence, precluding the development of European cooperation. Immediately after the "fall of communism", the defence apparatus was preoccupied by NATO expansion into the former Soviet bloc. The idea of a European army gained popularity after the September 11 attacks and NATO's involvement in conflicts outside of Europe. In a phenomenon dubbed diversification of European security, NATO has come to be responsible for "hard" threats while the European Union has taken a greater role in "soft" threats, including peacekeeping in the western Balkans. The 2009 Treaty of Lisbon also has furthered defence integration within the EU. This has led to support for a European Defence Union, which would be a step higher in collaboration than the current Common Security and Defence Policy.

In 2019, Germany and the Netherlands activated 414 Tank Battalion, the first that included soldiers from two EU countries. The battalion was created because Germany did not have enough soldiers, while the Netherlands lacked tank capability. This was described as a step towards a European army. However, the experience of the Franco-German Brigade in Alsace has been different, facing challenges due to greater linguistic and cultural differences. Notably, Germany's "innate caution since World War II about military intervention."

Under the current arrangement, there is no EU army and defence is reserved for the member states..

The European dimension inside the French Foreign Legion renders its possible adaptation into a European regiment. Its correspondance with existing European Battle groups provides an organic connection with national battalions. (See External links below).

== Defense obligations ==
According to current Treaty on European Union article 42(7):

If a Member State is the victim of armed aggression on its territory, the other Member States shall have towards it an obligation of aid and assistance by all the means in their power, in accordance with Article 51 of the United Nations Charter. This shall not prejudice the specific character of the security and defence policy of certain Member States.

According to the legal opinion prepared for the European Parliament, such obligation is stronger than NATO Article 5.

Both treaties recognize article 51 of Charter of the United Nations.

Accordingly, a hypothetical attacker on the territory of the European Union would impose an obligatory reaction from all European Union Member States which (by all the means of their power) can use their military forces respectively, except in situations where the Security Council has taken measures to restore peace according to article 51 of United Nations Charter.

- Austrian Armed Forces
- Belgian Armed Forces
- Bulgarian Armed Forces
- Armed Forces of Croatia
- Cypriot National Guard
- Czech Armed Forces
- Danish Defence Forces
- Netherlands Armed Forces
- Irish Defence Forces
- Italian Armed Forces
- Lithuanian Armed Forces
- Luxemburg Armed Forces
- Latvian National Armed Forces
- Estonian Defence Forces
- Finnish Defence Forces
- French Armed Forces
- German Bundeswehr
- Hellenic Armed Forces
- Hungarian Defence Forces
- Polish Armed Forces
- Portuguese Armed Forces
- Romanian Armed Forces
- Slovak Armed Forces
- Slovenian Armed Forces
- Swedish Armed Forces
- Spanish Armed Forces

== Eurocorps ==
Eurocorps is an autonomous military force of France, Germany (founding states), Belgium, Spain, Luxembourg and Poland (framework states) and Austria, Greece, Italy, Romania and Turkey (associate members) whose aim is to maintain common headquarters and command of selected national military units, up to 65,000 personnel.

The soldiers of Eurocorps are provided by their respective nations. The missions of the Eurocorps are generally assigned under the United Nations (UN), the European Union (EU), the North Atlantic Treaty Organization (NATO), under the European Union Common Foreign and Security Policy (CFSP), or pursuant to a joint decision taken by the contracting parties. According to a separate agreement, Eurocorps forces can be put under the command of the Supreme Allied Commander Europe.

== EU battlegroups ==
An EU battlegroup is a military unit based on staff contributions from a coalition of EU member states in size around 1,500 personnel and funded from Common Foreign and Security budget. Their deployment is subject to a unanimous decision by the Council of the European Union. Battlegroups are employable across the full range of tasks listed in article 43(1) of the Treaty on European Union: conflict prevention, initial stabilisation, humanitarian interventions and rescue tasks, crisis management and peacekeeping. EU Battlegroups are based on the principle of multi-nationality allowing even non-EU members, for example Nordic Battlegroup was joined by Norway which is not a member of the EU.

== European Maritime Force ==
In 1995, the European Maritime Force was formed by France, Italy, Portugal, and Spain to fulfill missions such as sea control, humanitarian missions, peacekeeping operations, crisis response operations, and peace enforcement. Missions can be deployed under European Union (EU), North Atlantic Treaty Organization (NATO) or United Nations (UN), mandate, and also as the four partner nations agree. The managing body of EMF is the High Level Inter-Ministerial Committee (CIMIN) composed by Chiefs of Defense (CHOD), Political Head Directorates of Defense and Foreign Affairs Ministries.

== European Gendarmerie Force ==
European Gendarmerie Force is a multinational military gendarmerie force with units provided by Koninklijke Marechaussee, Arma dei Carabinieri, Guardia Civil, Gendarmerie Nationale Française, Guarda Nacional Republicana, Jandarmeria Română and Żandarmeria Wojskowa, performing missions deployed outside European Union for supporting local forces with training, intelligence, analysis, policing, the fight against organized crime and counter-terrorism, border management, including the fight against smuggling and trafficking of human beings. The management is performed by the High Level Interdepartmental Committee (Comité InterMInistériel de haut Niveau or CIMIN) where each member state is represented.

== European NATO High Readiness Forces ==

The NATO Response Force (NRF) was a technologically advanced, multinational force with land, air, naval and Special Operations Forces (SOF) that the NATO Alliance could readily deploy, wherever needed. The Supreme Allied Commander Europe had 10 European NRF's under command, including Allied Rapid Reaction Corps (Gloucester, United Kingdom), Eurocorps (Strasbourg, France), Rapid Reaction Corps (Lille, France), 1st (German/Netherlands) Corps (Münster, Germany), Rapid Deployable Corps-Greece (Thessaloniki), Rapid Deployable Corps-Italy (Solbiate Olona), Multinational Corps Northeast (Szczecin, Poland), Multinational Corps Southeast (Sibiu, Romania), Rapid Deployable Corps-Spain (Valencia), Rapid Deployable Corps-Turkey (Istanbul).

The total personnel of NFR was around 40,000 troops. In 2024, the NFR was replaced by the Allied Reaction Force.

== Characteristics ==
The term "European army" is vague and it is not entirely clear what it would entail. Increasing integration would make security more efficient and less expensive for member states.

== Political positions ==
=== Support ===
French president Emmanuel Macron and former German Chancellor Angela Merkel have both expressed their support for a joint European army. Macron endorsed the idea in 2018, after the United States withdrew from the Intermediate-Range Nuclear Forces Treaty and in light of American President Donald Trump's scepticism of Atlanticism. Other European politicians who have expressed support include former French prime minister Alain Juppé (in 1996), former Italian prime minister Silvio Berlusconi, former European Commission President Jean-Claude Juncker, former Czech prime ministers Miloš Zeman and Bohuslav Sobotka, and Hungarian Prime Minister Viktor Orbán. A European army is on the official programme of the European People's Party.

Former Dutch deputy prime minister Kajsa Ollongren supported the idea while former defence minister Ank Bijleveld opposed it. It is also opposed by Eurosceptic politicians in the EU, such as Ryszard Legutko. NATO has been described as the "biggest obstacle" to a European army.

In 2021, the President of the Italian Republic Sergio Mattarella spoke about the need to create a European army, after the withdrawal of NATO forces from Afghanistan ended the War in Afghanistan allowing the takeover by the Taliban. Former Italian Prime Minister Silvio Berlusconi also spoke in favour of the creation of the European army to protect Europe's borders. The Italian Army General, Claudio Graziano, Chairman of the European Union Military Committee, also expressed the need to set up a European army as soon as possible.

At the 2021 State of the Union address delivered by the President of the European Commission to the European Parliament, Ursula von der Leyen said to European Union members that "what we need is the European Defence Union" and that "the European Union is a unique security provider. There will be missions where NATO or the UN will not be present but where Europe should be... There have been many discussions on expeditionary forces. On what type and how many we need: battlegroups or EU entry forces. This is no doubt part of the debate – and I believe it will be part of the solution. But the more fundamental issue is why this has not worked in the past." and announced a 'Summit on European defence'.

On 17 September 2021, the Italian Prime Minister, Mario Draghi talked about the European army at the end of the EuMed summit in Athens, with an urgent tone for its establishment.

The announcement of the AUKUS "trilateral security partnership" between Australia, UK and US to "sustain peace and stability in the Indo-Pacific region" is seen as an attempt to limit China's rise as a global military power. However, this has led to some mistrust in Europe, in particular in France, that has contributed to increasing the process of the formation of a European Army.

On 28 September 2021, Greece and France signed a multibillion-euro military agreement. The Greek prime minister Kyriakos Mitsotakis called the idea of a European army "a mature proposal" and that this agreement could be a first big step towards a European army.

The Paneuropean Union actively supports the creation of a European army.

On 5 November 2024, in the midst of Donald Trump's victory in the 2024 United States presidential election, Luxembourgian Prime Minister Luc Frieden called for the formation of a European Army stating that "Russia's unacceptable invasion of Ukraine has been a wake-up call."

On 15 February 2025, in a speech at the 61st Munich Security Conference, President of Ukraine Volodymyr Zelenskyy called for the creation of an "Army of Europe" in order to counter Russia with the prospect of wavering support from the United States. This follows the previous day's speech of Vice President of the United States JD Vance, in which he called for Europe to "step up in a big way" in regard to its own defense.

In a speech to Spain's parliament on 26 March 2025, Prime Minister Pedro Sánchez called for establishing a European army. He highlighted worries about Russia reviving its historical imperialist goals and stressed the need for Europe to strengthen its collective defense.

=== Opposition ===
According to NATO officials, the alliance has discouraged independent European defence capabilities, both as an attempt to avoid duplication and as a moral hazard effect from US defence subsidies prompting less military spending by European countries. The United States ambassador to NATO also expressed opposition to any European protectionism in developing its own defence industry. Former NATO Secretary-General Jens Stoltenberg said that the European Union could not defend itself without NATO and should not try to form a European army.

On the occasion of the 70th anniversary of NATO's presence in Italy, Mattarella spoke of a strengthening of European defense within the alliance with NATO.

== Public opinion ==
A 2019 survey found that 37% of Dutch citizens "approved the idea of a European army" while 30% are opposed to formation of an army of all EU members.

In April 2022, YouGov conducted a survey in sixteen European Union member countries and the United Kingdom asking about support for the creation of an integrated European army. The results of this survey are presented in the table below.

Country	Support	Opposition	Don't know	Lead	Change since 2021
Poland	57	21	22	+36	▲3%
Romania	51	23	26	+28	▼4%
Hungary	50	29	21	+21	▼5%
Lithuania	62	22	16	+40	▲5%
Finland	53	21	25	+32	▲8%
Sweden	48	27	25	+21	▲9%
Denmark	41	39	20	+2	▲5%
Spain	64	21	15	+43	▲7%
Greece	55	27	17	+28	▼8%
Italy	50	30	20	+20	0%
Netherlands	61	23	17	+38	▲9%
Germany	58	27	15	+31	▲4%
France	55	24	21	+31	▲3%
United Kingdom	34	35	30	–1	▲10%
Croatia	49	23	28	+26	—N/a
Slovakia	44	37	19	+7	—N/a
Bulgaria	39	33	28	+6	—N/a

== See also ==
- Defence forces of the European Union
- Permanent Structured Cooperation – European Union defence policy agreement
- European Defence Agency – Agency of the European Union
- EU Battlegroup
- 414 Tank Battalion
- Lithuanian–Polish–Ukrainian Brigade – Trinational military unit formed in 2014
