= Headline Goal 2010 =

Military capability target for 2010

The Headline Goal 2010 was a military capability target set by the European Council in June 2004 after the previous Helsinki Headline Goal had been completed in 2003.

The Goal aimed to develop defence areas where the Helsinki Goal had had an "absence of commitment" and to have EU member states "to be able by 2010 to respond with rapid and decisive action ... to the whole spectrum of crisis management operations covered by the Treaty on European Union".

The 2010 Goal included 'battle groups', non-permanent combat units which were set up for six months each and consisted of around 1,500 soldiers, and the improvement of air capabilities.
