= Eurocorps =

Military corps of the European Union

- Active: 1992–present
- Country: 11 states: Framework nations; Belgium; France; Germany; Luxembourg; Poland; Spain; Associated nations; Austria; Greece; Italy; Romania; Turkey
- Branch: Army
- Type: Multinational Military Corps Headquarters
- Garrison/HQ: HQ Strasbourg; France; Multinational Command Support Brigade – Strasbourg
- Mottos: A force for the European Union and NATO
- March: European anthem
- Website: www.eurocorps.org

Commanders
- Eurocorps Commander: Lieutenant General Aroldo Lázaro Sáenz (Spain)

The Eurocorps (French: Eurocorps; German: Eurokorps), located in the city of Strasbourg, is a multinational corps headquarters. Founded by France and Germany in 1992, it is today composed of personnel from six framework nations and five associated nations. The framework nations place the Eurocorps at the service of the European Union (EU) and the North Atlantic Treaty Organization (NATO), which certified it in 2002 as one of its nine High Readiness Land Headquarters (HRF (L) HQ).

The precedents of the Eurocorps date back to 1989, when German Chancellor Helmut Kohl and French President François Mitterrand initiated military cooperation by establishing the Franco-German Defense and Security Council and creating a joint brigade, which became operational in 1991. Subsequently, in 1992, at the La Rochelle summit, both countries signed the report that led to the creation of the Eurocorps. That same year, the first German and French officers joined the unit. In 1993 Belgium joined, followed by Spain a year later. In 1995 it was declared operational, and the following year Luxembourg joined. In 2022 Poland became the sixth framework nation. Currently there are five associated countries: Greece, Turkey, Italy, Austria and Romania. There have also been, during different periods, military personnel from Canada (2003–2007), the United Kingdom (1999–2002), the Netherlands (1999–2002) and Finland (2002–2005).

The Eurocorps was formally established on a legal basis by the Treaty concerning the Eurocorps and the status of its headquarters, also known as the Treaty of Strasbourg, an agreement signed in Brussels on 22 November 2004 by the defense ministers of the five member countries at that time (Germany, France, Belgium, Spain and Luxembourg) and ratified by their respective national parliaments. It became effective on 26 February 2009. The purpose of the treaty, as stated in article 1, is to "define the fundamental principles relating to the missions, organization and functioning of the Eurocorps". Article 2 defines it as "the multinational army corps consisting of the Headquarters and the units in respect of which the Contracting Parties have effected the transfer of command to the Commanding General of the Eurocorps".

As for Eurocorps missions, article 3 states they may be entrusted to it in the context of the UN, the EU Common Security and Defence Policy (CSDP) and NATO, in the context of evacuation, humanitarian affairs, peacekeeping or crisis management.

== Participating countries ==
Six countries participate in the corps as member states. The treaty allows for any EU member state to become a member of Eurocorps, subject to the approval of existing Eurocorps members. Additionally, there are five associated members. The Eurocorps is staffed by personnel from both framework and partner nations.

=== Participating members ===
- Belgium – since 1993
- France – since 1992
- Germany – since 1992
- Luxembourg – since 1996
- Poland – since 2021
- Spain – since 1994

=== Associated members ===
- Austria – 2002–2011; since 2021
- Greece – since 2002
- Italy – since 2009
- Romania – since 2016
- Turkey – since 2002

==== Former associated members ====
- Canada – 2003–2007
- Finland – 2002–2006
- Netherlands – 1999–2002
- United Kingdom – 1999–2002

== History ==
Eurocorps has its origins in the Franco-German Brigade, created in 1989. Following this approach, on 14 October 1991, France and Germany announced their intention to further strengthen European defense integration through the establishment of a corps headquarters. During the Franco-German summit in La Rochelle on 22 May 1992, French President François Mitterrand and German Chancellor Helmut Kohl decided to launch the project and to establish the Eurocorps headquarters. Although initially it was a Franco-German association, the Eurocorps was soon opened up to all member states of the Western European Union (WEU).

On 19 June, the European Union issued the Petersberg Declaration, which defined those missions that could be entrusted to the WEU and that Eurocorps would also undertake: ensuring the common defense of allied countries, carrying out peacekeeping or peace-keeping operations for the benefit of the United Nations or the Organization for Security and Cooperation in Europe, as well as other missions of a humanitarian nature.

On 1 July 1992, a provisional General Staff is installed in the French city of Strasbourg to create the foundations of the Eurocorps Headquarters.

On 21 January 1993, an agreement was signed with SACEUR placing the Eurocorps at the disposal of the North Atlantic Treaty Organization. On 1 October of the same year, the Eurocorps headquarters was definitively established in Strasbourg, on the basis of the General Staff activated a few months earlier.

During these first years, several countries joined the Franco-German initiative. On 12 October 1993, Belgium joined the Eurocorps with a mechanized division; on 1 July 1994, the Spanish Council of Ministers authorized the participation of Spain with a mechanized division; Luxembourg joined the project on 7 May 1996.

In November 1995, the Eurocorps reached the necessary conditions to be officially declared operational.

At that time the Eurocorps had the following units permanently affiliated: the 1st French Armored Division, the 10th German Armored Division, the 1st Belgian Mechanized Division, which included a Luxembourg reconnaissance company, the Mechanized Division "Brunete" and the Franco-German Brigade, totaling 50,000 troops, 645 tanks, 1,400 armored vehicles and 360 artillery pieces.

This situation continued until 1999, when the heads of state and government of the five Eurocorps framework nations declared at the European Council held in Cologne (3 and 4 June) their agreement to "adapt the European Army Corps, and in particular its Headquarters, to the new strategic scenario in order to convert it into a European Rapid Reaction Corps, responding to the European Union's desire to have forces adapted to crisis management operations".

The political statement was subsequently developed in the Luxembourg Report, November 1999, which set out the general guidelines for the aforementioned transformation, once again respecting the dual transatlantic and European orientation, by keeping the Eurocorps at the disposal of NATO and the EU for crisis management operations.

Poland was accepted as a member in 2010. This was expected to become effective from 1 January 2016, but was delayed to January 2017. However, a change in government with the 2015 Polish election led to the application for full membership being withdrawn in favour of remaining an associate member. In November 2021, Poland again expressed an interest in joining as a full member, and it became a framework member in 2022.

On 25 February 2003, Austria and Finland signed a treaty which allowed them to send staff to the headquarters of the corps. Finland remained an associated nation of the corps until 2005, and Austria until 2011. Romania became an associated nation in April 2016, while Austria rejoined as an associate nation in 2021. In addition, the Netherlands and United Kingdom have sent liaison officers to the headquarters of the corps.

The Eurocorps has adopted a modular philosophy and the affiliation of large units is no longer permanent. Today, such affiliation is based on the actual missions in which the Eurocorps has to intervene and its only permanent units are the Headquarters and a multinational support brigade.

Eurocorps is today one of the nine NATO High Readiness Land Headquarters (HRF (L) HQ), having been certified as such in 2003 and is fully integrated in the NATO Response Force (NRF) rotation system, the Eurocorps HQ is also offered to the EU for crisis management operations as a Land Component Command or European Union Battlegroups Headquarters (EUBG).

=== Badge ===
The chest badge was created by an officer of the French Army's employment office, Lieutenant Colonel Pellabeuf. This badge, approved on 18 June 1993 under the number G4000, was produced by the Delsart company and, by order of the Chief of Staff, General Clerc, was worn for the first time on 5 November 1993, during the official ceremony of creation of the corps and in the presence of the Ministers of Defense of the three participating countries at that time (Germany, France and Belgium).

Its description is "an insignia in the form of a shield symbolizing the defense of the European continent".

Europe is represented by two symbols:

- The blue background and the golden stars of the European flag,
- A symbolic silhouette of the continent that allows us to hide some of the stars and thus avoid over-identification with the European Union or the Council of Europe.

On the other hand, a sword reminds us that the Eurocorps is a large military unit.

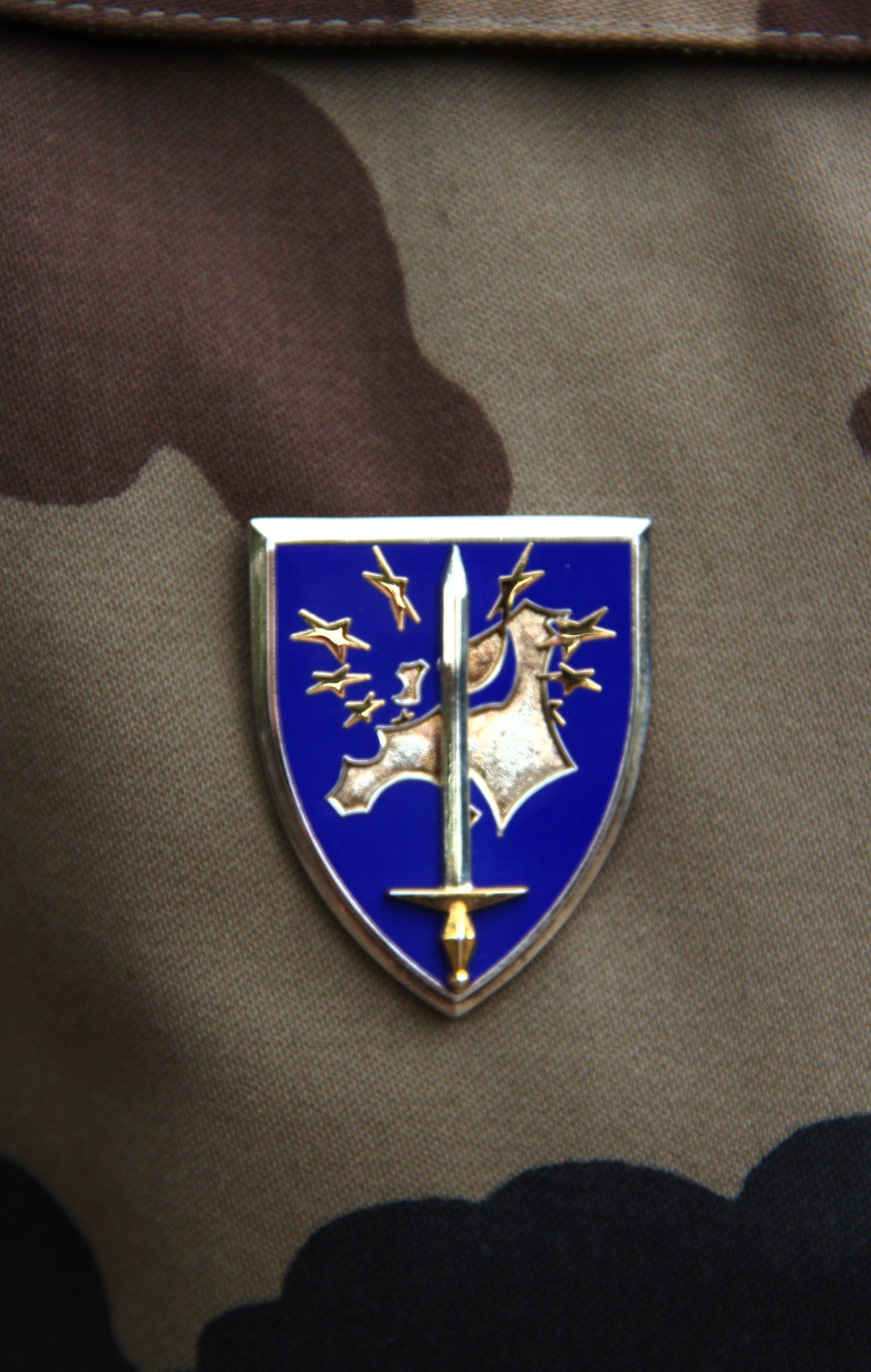
Chest badge.

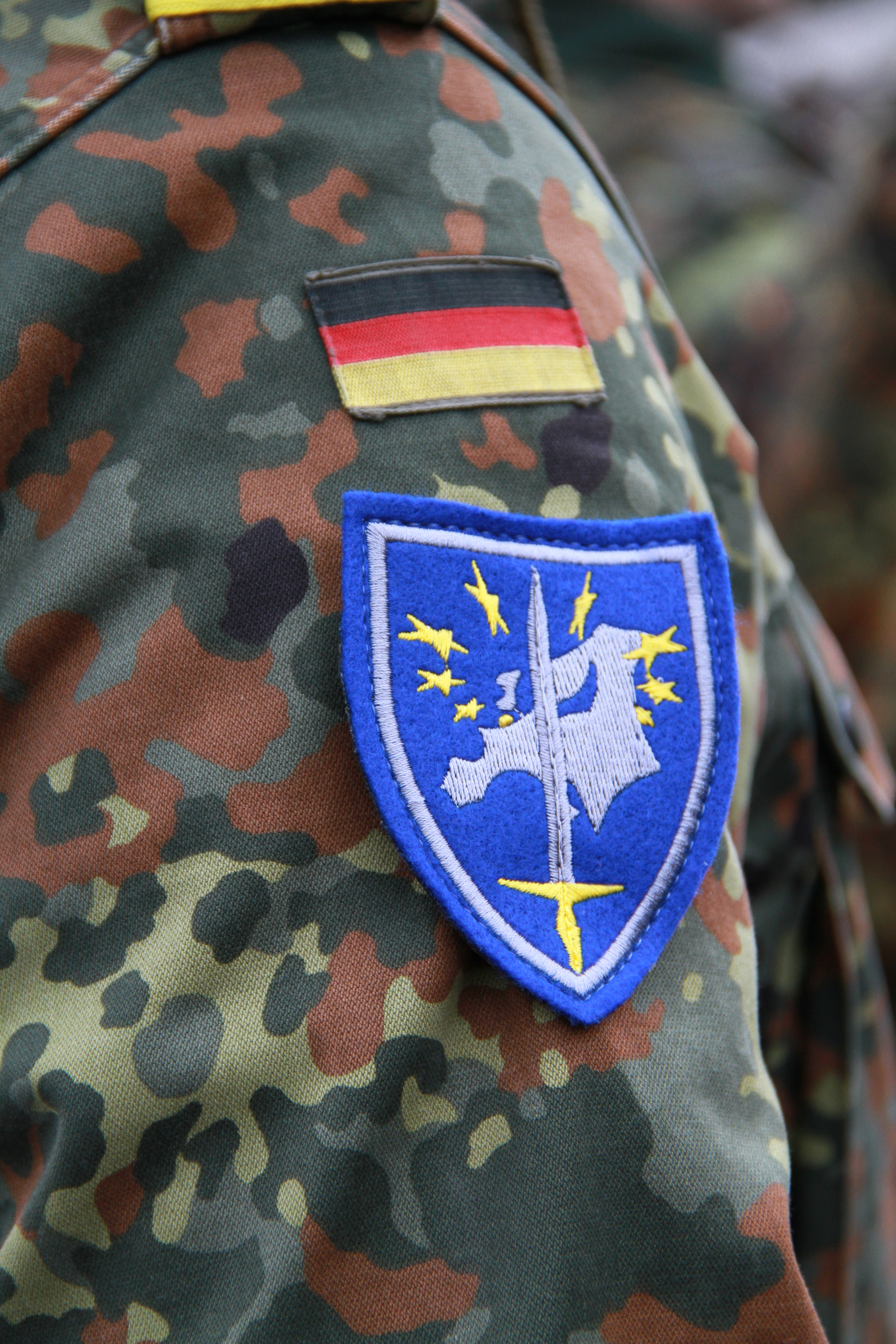
Arm badge.

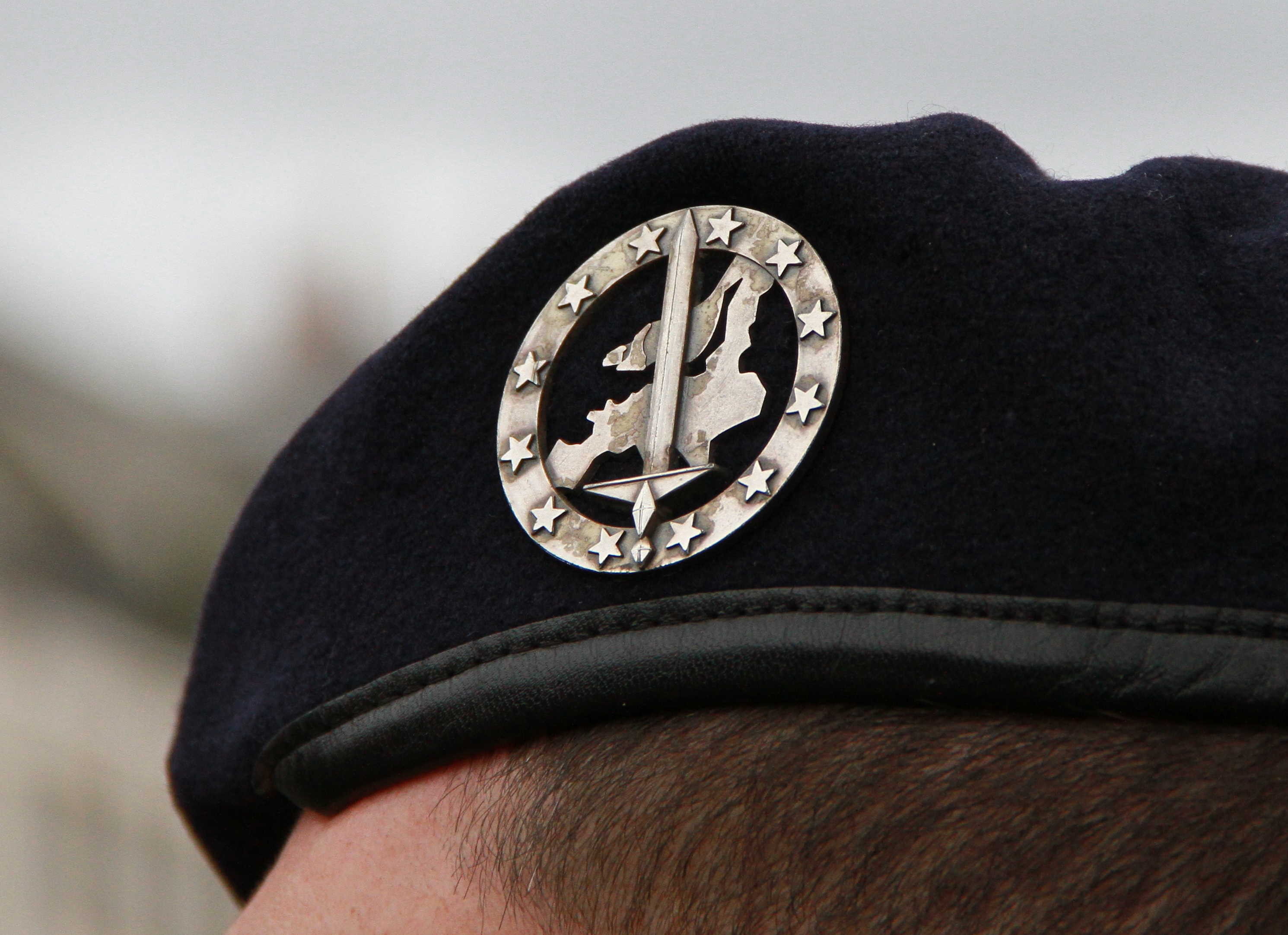
Beret badge.

== Organisation ==
=== Politico-military direction ===
The Eurocorps belongs to the six framework nations and is not subordinate to any other supranational defense organization. It is deployed on the authority of the Common Committee representing the member states, the Chief of Defence, and the Political Director of the Ministry of Foreign Affairs. Its mission is to ensure the political-military direction and the coordination and conditions of employment of the forces and it is the collegiate body in charge of maintaining relations with Western defense alliances (EU and NATO) and other international organizations. This committee considers requests for support from multinational organizations such as the UN, NATO, OSCE. The Corps can also be deployed at the request of the framework nations.

=== Structure ===
The Eurocorps Headquarters is composed of a Command Group, a General Staff, a Multinational Support Brigade and the NSD.

==== Command Group ====
- Located in the "Aubert de Vincelles" barracks. It is composed of the Eurocorps lieutenant general, a second-in-command general, a chief of staff and the heads of the various divisions of the General Staff.

==== General Staff ====
- Located in the "Aubert de Vincelles" barracks. Multinational in nature, it is designed to be used with great flexibility and to be completed in a progressive and balanced manner with personnel from the different participating countries. The working language is English.

==== Multinational Support Brigade ====
- Located in the "Aubert de Vincelles" and "Lizé" barracks. It is made up of military personnel from the various member countries. Its task is to provide the necessary support for the deployment and support of the HQ (communications, protection, food, transport, accommodation...)

==== NSD ====
- National support detachment. It is in charge of national issues of the different framework states and is located at the barracks of "Lizé".

=== Relationship with EU defence policy ===
The European Corps is presently not established at the EU level (referred to as the Common Security and Defence Policy, CSDP); it is for instance not a project of the Permanent Structured Cooperation (PESCO) of the CSDP. The European Corps and its assets may however contribute in the implementation of the CSDP, when made available as a multinational force in accordance with article 42.3 of the Treaty on European Union (TEU).

== Operations ==
The corps has:

- From May 1998 to January 2000: deployment in the Balkans, where Eurocorps participates in four successive contingents of the NATO Stabilization Force in Bosnia and Herzegovina (SFOR).
- Led KFOR III in Kosovo from 18 April 2000 to October 2000
- Led the ISAF6 Force in Afghanistan from 9 August 2004 to 11 February 2005.
- From 1 July 2006, to 10 January 2007, the headquarters of the corps was the land component stand by element of the NATO Response Force 7.
- From 1 July 2010 to 10 January 2011, the headquarters of the corps was the land component stand by element of the NATO Response Force 15 (NRF 15).
- In 2012, the corps has deployed to ISAF in Afghanistan.
- In the second semester the Eurocorps supported Germany with 57 soldiers in the EU mission EUTM Mali.
- July 2016 to July 2017: twelve-month standby period as headquarters of the ground component of two successive rotations of the European Union Battle Group (EUBG).
- From July 2016 to January 2018: deployment to the Central African Republic, where Eurocorps leads three successive contingents of the European Union Training Mission in the Central African Republic (EUTM RCA).
- In January 2020, Eurocorps takes a one-year NATO alert as command of the ground component of NATO Response Force 20.
- First and second half of 2021 European Union Training Mission in Mali (EUTM MALI).
- Second half of 2021 and first half of 2022 European Union Training Mission in the Central African Republic (EUTM RCA) aims to advise and support the government in the training of the country's new armed forces, which are playing an important role in the stabilization of the country.

== Eurocorps commanding generals ==
The key positions of the HQ, including that of its chief general, are assigned on a rotating basis among the nations. Since its foundation, the Heads of the Eurocorps have been as follows:

- Lieutenant General Helmut Willmann: 1993–1996 (Germany)
- Lieutenant General Pierre Forterre: 1996–1997 (France)
- Lieutenant General Léo Van Den Bosch: 1997–1999 (Belgium)
- Lieutenant General Juan Ortuño Such: 1999–2001 (Spain)
- Lieutenant General Holger Kammerhoff: 2001–2003 (Germany)
- Lieutenant General Jean-Louis Py: 2003–2005 (France)
- Lieutenant General Charles-Henri Delcour: 2005–2007 (Belgium)
- Lieutenant General Pedro Pitarch Bartolomé: 2007–2009 (Spain)
- Lieutenant General Hans-Lothar Domröse: 2009–2011 (Germany)
- Lieutenant General Olivier de Bavinchove: 2011–2013 (France)
- Lieutenant General Guy Buchsenschmidt: 2013–2015 (Belgium)
- Lieutenant General Alfredo Ramírez Fernández: 2015–2017 (Spain)
- Lieutenant General Jürgen Weigt: 2017–2019 (Germany)
- Lieutenant General Laurent Kolodziej: 2019–2021 (France)
- Lieutenant General Peter Devogelaere: 2021–2023 (Belgium)
- Lieutenant General Jarosław Gromadziński: 2023–2024 (Poland)
- Lieutenant General Piotr Błazeusz: 2024–2025 (Poland)
- Lieutenant General Aroldo Lázaro Sáenz 2025–pres. (Spain)

== See also ==
- Combined Joint Expeditionary Force (CJEF)
- European Institutions in Strasbourg
- Franco-British Defence and Security Cooperation Treaty and Downing Street Declaration
- EUFOR
- European Gendarmerie Force
- European Maritime Force
- European Astronaut Corps
- EU Battlegroup
- Common Security and Defence Policy
- Common Security and Defence Policy#Structure
- European Security Strategy
- European Defense Agency
- Overseas interventions of the European Union
- Ukraine
- NATO
- Franco-German Brigade
