= European Union Military Operation in the Republic of Macedonia =

European Union Military Operation

- Abbreviation: EUFOR Concordia
- Successor: EUPOL PROXIMA
- Formation: 31 March 2003
- Dissolved: 15 December 2003
- Website: https://eeas.europa.eu/archives/csdp/missions-and-operations/concordia/index_en.htm

The European Union Military Operation in the Republic of Macedonia or EUFOR Concordia was a European Union (EU) peacekeeping mission in the Republic of Macedonia (now North Macedonia), which started on 31 March 2003. The EU took over from NATO's operation Allied Harmony and deployed around 300 troops to provide security to EU and Organization for Security and Co-operation in Europe (OSCE) monitors overseeing the implementation of the Ohrid Framework Agreement, a peace settlement resolving the conflict between the government and country's ethnic Albanian community. It thus became the first ever military operation of the EU. While keeping EU's control over the entire chain of command the mission closely cooperated with NATO through transparency and regular consultations and its headquarters were at the Supreme Headquarters Allied Powers Europe in Mons. France suggested fully autonomous EU operation but United Kingdom and Germany feared it will be perceived as antagonistic to NATO.

EUFOR Concordia was a significant event in the evolution of the EU's security cooperation. In the words of the then EU High Representative for the Common Foreign and Security Policy, Javier Solana, when the Common European Foreign and Security Policy started only about a decade before, in 1992, "[f]ew then believed that... we would send out men in arms under the EU's flag."

On 15 December 2003 the EUFOR Concordia was replaced by an EU Police Mission, code-named EUPOL PROXIMA, and the 400 EU soldiers were replaced by 200 EU police officers.
