= European Security Strategy =

2003–2016 European Union doctrine

The European Security Strategy is the document in which the European Union clarifies its security strategy which is aimed at achieving a secure Europe in a better world, identifying the threats facing the Union, defining its strategic objectives and setting out the political implications for Europe. The European security strategy was drawn up in 2003 under the authority of the EU's High Representative for the Common Foreign and Security Policy, Javier Solana, and adopted by the Brussels European Council of 12 and 13 December 2003.

The strategy was replaced in 2016 by the European Union Global Strategy.

== The Venusberg Group ==
The Venusberg Group has produced three reports related to the development of the European Security Strategy. They are:

1. Enhancing the European Union as an International Security Actor (2000)
2. A European Defence Strategy (2004)
3. Beyond 2010 – European Grand Strategy in a Global Age (2008)

== See also ==
- Common Foreign and Security Policy
- European Security (journal)
- European Union Institute for Security Studies
- History of the Common Security and Defence Policy
- Strategic Compass for Security and Defence
