= Petersberg Declaration =

Multinational resolution

- Presented: 19 June 1992
- Author: Western European Union
- Purpose: To provide the WEU with forces, assets and responsibilities

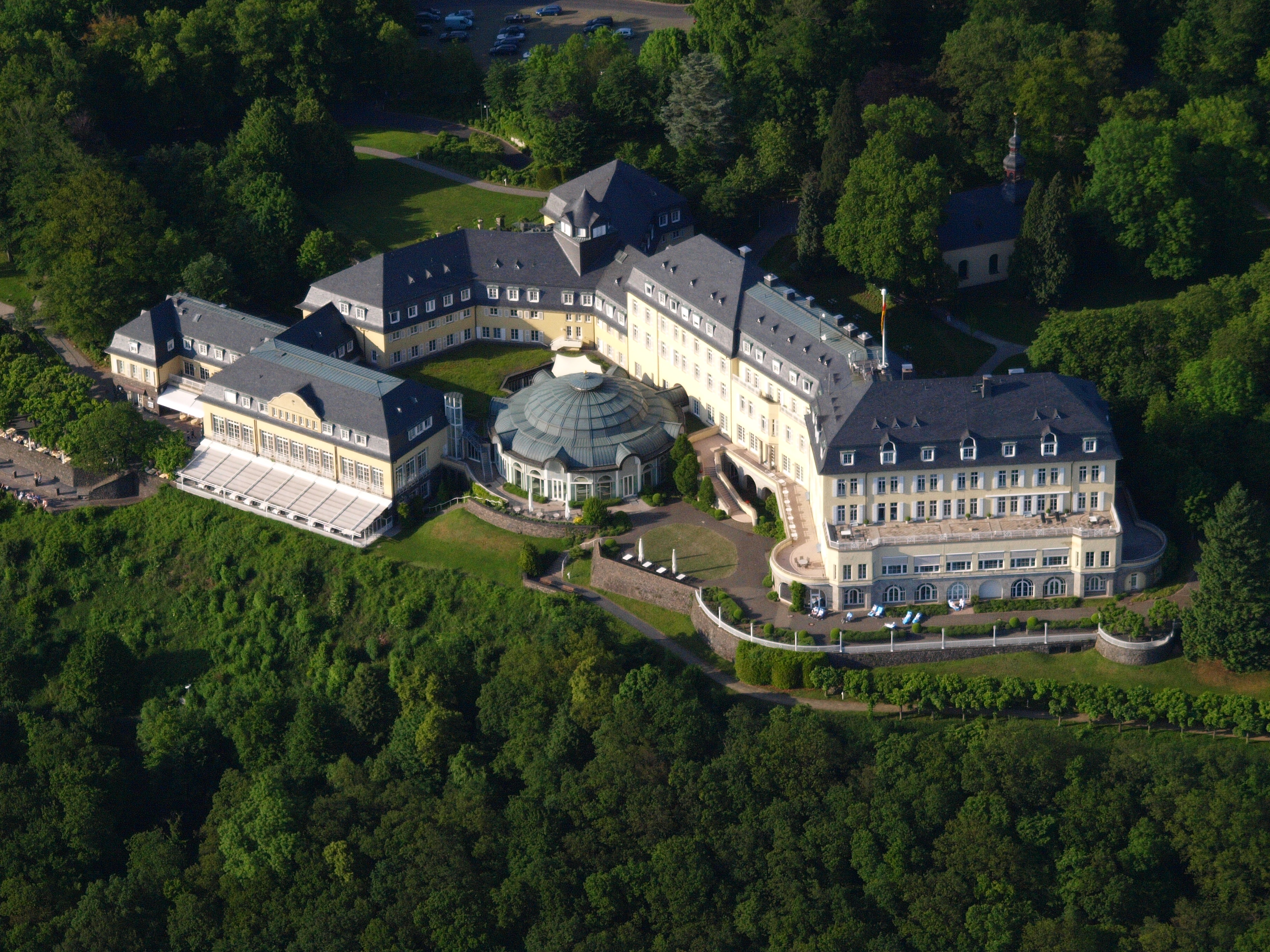
Hotel Petersberg, where the Petersberg tasks were defined in 1992.

The Petersberg Declaration was adopted by ministers of the Western European Union on 19 June 1992 at Hotel Petersberg, near Bonn in Germany. It defined military tasks of a humanitarian, disarming, peacekeeping and peacemaking nature that the WEU would be empowered to do. The contents and responsibilities arising from the declaration, known as the Petersberg Tasks, were later transferred to the European Union's (EU) European Security and Defence Policy (ESDP), presently known as the Common Security and Defence Policy (CSDP).

== Outline ==
The member states agreed to deploy their troops and resources from across the whole spectrum of the military under the authority of the WEU. The tasks, which covered a range of possible military missions ranging from the simplest to the most robust military intervention, were formulated as:

- Humanitarian and rescue tasks
- Peacekeeping tasks
- Tasks of combat forces in crisis management, including peacemaking.

Officially, the range of tasks the EU/WEU committed itself to "included" the above, but were not limited to them. In practice, the task of territorial defence is considered the domain of NATO. As 21 of the 27 EU member states are also NATO members, there are many provisions to prevent competition with NATO.

== Transfer to the EU ==
As a part of the partial merger of the WEU with the European Union, these tasks became part of the European Security and Defence Policy, and were central to strengthening the European Union's second pillar, the Common Foreign and Security Policy.

In 1997, during the European summit in Amsterdam, the tasks were incorporated in the Treaty on European Union. Both the WEU, NATO and the EU could enforce the Petersberg tasks, but with the transfer of the most important WEU assets to the EU in 1999, this distinction became mostly artificial.

The transfer of bodies from the WEU to the EU as well as the collective defence clause of the Treaty of Lisbon, which entered into force in 2009, rendered the WEU obsolete, and the WEU was abolished in 2011.

== See also ==
- Common Security and Defence Policy
- Western European Union
- Treaty on European Union
