= Common Foreign and Security Policy =

Organised, agreed foreign policy of the European Union

The Common Foreign and Security Policy (CFSP) is the organised, agreed foreign policy of the European Union (EU) for mainly security and defence diplomacy and actions. CFSP deals only with a specific part of the EU's external relations, whose domains include trade and commercial policy and funding to third countries. Decisions require unanimity among member states in the Council of the European Union, but once agreed, certain aspects can be further decided by qualified majority voting. Foreign policy is chaired and represented by the EU's High Representative, currently Kaja Kallas.

The CFSP sees the North Atlantic Treaty Organisation (NATO) as responsible for the territorial defence of Europe and reconciliation. However, since 1999, the European Union is responsible for implementing missions such as peacekeeping and policing of treaties. A phrase often used to describe the relationship between the EU forces and NATO is "separable, but not separate". The same forces and capabilities form the basis of both EU and NATO efforts, but portions can be allocated to the European Union if necessary.

== History ==
Common Foreign and Security Policy

Pillar of the European Union
- The three pillars constituting the European Union (clickable)
- EPC ← 1993–2009 → EU

=== 1957–1993 ===
Co-operation in international trade negotiations, under the EU's Common Commercial Policy, dates back to the establishment of the community in 1957. The CFSP itself has its origins in the formation of European Political Co-operation (EPC) in 1970. European Political Co-operation was an informal consultation process between member states on foreign policy matters, with the aim of creating a common approach to foreign policy issues and promoting both the EC's own interests and those of the international community as a whole. This includes promoting international co-operation, respect for human rights, democracy, and the rule of law.

=== 1993–2009: Pillar system ===
The weaknesses evident in EPC, apparent, for example during the Yugoslav wars, led to a desire to strengthen foreign policy. That was consolidated in the Maastricht Treaty, which entered into force in 1993 and established the European Union. While the previously existing supranational European Economic Community became one of three pillars, two more pillars were erected. The second CFSP-pillar was based on intergovernmentalism, which meant unanimity between members in the Council of Ministers and little influence by the other institutions.

The Amsterdam Treaty created the office of the High Representative for the Common Foreign and Security Policy (held by Javier Solana until 1 December 2009) to co-ordinate and represent the EU's foreign policy.

=== 2009–present: Consolidation ===
The Treaty of Lisbon took effect in December 2009 and brought an end to the pillar system. The CFSP's status of being a "pillar" thus ended. Furthermore, in an effort to ensure greater co-ordination and consistency in EU foreign policy, the Treaty of Lisbon created a High Representative of the Union for Foreign Affairs and Security Policy, de facto merging the post of High Representative for the Common Foreign and Security Policy and European Commissioner for External Relations and European Neighbourhood Policy. Since December 2011 the High Representative (HR) is in charge of the European External Action Service (EEAS), which was also created by the Treaty of Lisbon. It essentially is intended to be a common Foreign Office or Diplomatic Corps for the European Union.

== Objectives ==
According to Article J.1 of title V of the Maastricht Treaty, the European Union defines and implements a common foreign and security policy that covers all areas of foreign and security policy, the objectives of which are to:

- Safeguard the common values, fundamental interests, independence and integrity of the Union in conformity with the principles of the United Nations Charter;
- Strengthen the security of the Union in all ways;
- Preserve peace and strengthen international security, in accordance with the principles of the United Nations Charter, as well as the principles of the Helsinki Final Act and the objectives of the Paris Charter, including those on external borders;
- Promote international co-operation;
- Develop and consolidate democracy and the rule of law, and respect for human rights and fundamental freedoms.

== Elements ==
=== Types of policy ===
The European Council defines the principles and general guidelines for the CFSP as well as common strategies to be implemented by the EU. On the basis of those guidelines the Council of Ministers adopts joint actions or common positions. Joint actions address specific situations where operation action by the EU is considered necessary and lay down the objectives, scope and means to be made available to the EU. They commit the member states. Common positions, on the other hand, define the approach that the EU takes on a certain matter of geographical or thematic nature, and define in the abstract the general guidelines to which the national policies of Member states must conform.

=== High Representative ===
The High Representative, in conjunction with the President of the European Council, speaks on behalf of the EU in agreed foreign policy matters and can have the task of articulating ambiguous policy positions created by disagreements among member states. The Common Foreign and Security Policy requires unanimity among the 27 member states on the appropriate policy to follow on any particular policy. Disagreements in CFSP, such as those that occurred over the war in Iraq, are not uncommon.

The High Representative also coordinates the work of the European Union Special Representatives. With the Lisbon Treaty taking effect, the position became distinct from the Secretary-General of the Council of Ministers. The High Representative serves as the head of the European Defence Agency and exercises the same functions over the Common Security and Defence Policy as the CFSP. The High Representative since 2024 has been Kaja Kallas.

=== Bodies ===
There are a number of bodies set up within the context of the CFSP. Within the council, there is the Foreign Affairs Council (FAC) configuration, essentially a meeting of foreign ministers and the Political and Security Committee or PSC, which monitors the international situation in the areas covered by the CFSP and contributes by delivering opinions to the Council of Ministers, either at its request or its own initiative, and also monitors the implementation of agreed policies.

The European Defence Agency (EDA) encourages increase in defence capabilities, military research and the establishment of a European internal market for military technology. Two bodies carried over from the Western European Union (see defence, below) are the European Union Institute for Security Studies (EUISS) and the European Union Satellite Centre (EUSC). The EUISS is the European Union's in-house think tank. Its mission is to find a common security culture for the EU, to help develop and project the CFSP, and to enrich Europe's strategic debate. The EUSC provides analysis of satellite imagery and collateral data.

== Defence policy ==
The Common Security and Defence Policy (CSDP) is the part of the CFSP that relates to defence and crisis management, implemented by EU structures in CSDP missions drawing on civilian and military assets provided by member states. Based on articles 42–46 of the Treaty on European Union (TEU), the CSDP also entails a mutual defence clause amongst member states as well as a Permanent Structured Cooperation (PESCO) in which 26 of the 27 national armed forces pursue structural integration.

Article 42.2 of TEU states that the CSDP includes the 'progressive framing' of a common Union defence policy, and will lead to a common defence, when the European Council of national heads of state or government, acting unanimously, so decides.

When participating in CSDP missions abroad for peace-keeping, conflict prevention and strengthening international security in accordance with the principles of the United Nations Charter, the national armed forces may either act in an existing national force framework, as part of an intergovemental force made available to the CSDP through article 42.3 of TEU, such as the European Corps (Eurocorps), the EU Battlegroups (EUBG) or the European Gendarmerie Force (Eurogendfor).

The Union's High Representative for Foreign Affairs and Security Policy (HR/VP) is responsible for proposing and implementing CSDP decisions. Such decisions are taken by the Foreign Affairs Council (FAC), generally requiring unanimity.

The CSDP organisation, headed by the HR/VP, comprises relevant sections of the External Action Service (EEAS) – including the operational headquarters (MPCC) of the Military Staff (EUMS) – a number of FAC preparatory bodies – such as the Military Committee (EUMC) – as well as four Agencies, including the Defence Agency (EDA). Since 2017, the CSDP has also been facilitated by a defence fund and a Coordinated Annual Review on Defence (CARD).

=== Neutrality ===
Although the Irish people were reassured of their neutrality before agreeing to the Nice Treaty, the Finnish Prime Minister, Matti Vanhanen, on 5 July 2006, while speaking to the European Parliament as Council President declared:

Mr Pflüger described Finland as neutral. I must correct him on that: Finland is a member of the EU. We were at one time a politically neutral country, during the time of the Iron Curtain. Now we are a member of the Union, part of this community of values, which has a common policy and, moreover, a common foreign policy.

Nevertheless, a similar guarantee on neutrality in relation to the Treaty of Lisbon was granted to Ireland at the European Council of 18/19 June 2009:

The European Council also agreed that other concerns of the Irish people, as presented by the Taoiseach, relating to taxation policy, the right to life, education and the family, and Ireland's traditional policy of military neutrality, would be addressed to the mutual satisfaction of Ireland and the other Member States, by way of the necessary legal guarantees.

== Stopping humanitarian atrocities ==
EU foreign policy is committed to the protection of human rights. Research suggests that rhetoric along these lines from EU decision-makers is consistent with actual EU foreign policy activity. Military and economic interventions by the EU are consistently more likely in countries where violence explicitly targets civilians. Likewise, human rights sanctions are consistently applied against states responsible for human rights violations. Geostrategic concerns also influence EU action, as the EU has been "most attentive to human rights violations in non-EU European states, followed by countries in sub-Saharan Africa, while it has been least active in Asia and the Americas".

== European Peace Facility ==
The European Peace Facility (EPF) is an off-budget EU financing instrument set up in March 2021, aiming towards the delivering of military aid to partner countries and funding the deployment of EU military missions abroad under the CFSP.

== Counterterrorism policy ==
The European Union considers to be terrorist organisations those groups or those entities that are controlled directly or indirectly by persons who commit or attempt to commit terrorist acts, participating in these groups, or facilitating the execution of terrorist plans. It also includes defining those groups and entities acting on behalf or under the direction of such persons, groups and entities, including funds derived or generated from property owned or controlled directly or indirectly by such persons or by associated persons, groups and entities. The watch list was reviewed for the Law Library of Congress in 2007.

The European Union gives a definition of terrorism as Common Position 2001/931/CFSP of 27 December 2001, also referred to by successive acts. It highlights them as intentional acts which, given their nature or context as defined crimes under domestic law, may seriously harm a State or an international organization when committed for the purpose of:

- seriously intimidating a population
- unduly compelling a Government or international organization to perform or abstain from performing any act
- seriously destabilizing or destroying the fundamental political, constitutional, economic or social constructs

=== List of terrorist organisations ===
The list of terrorist organisations was started in 2001 with the 13 organisations listed on 27 December of Common Position 2001/931/CFSP. The European Community had not listed Al-Qaeda although the 9/11 attacks had been the instigator of the list. It has been updated by a number of subsequent declarations, such as Common Position 2006/231/CFSP of 21 December 2005; for example so as to include LTTE. Common Position 2005/847/CFSP of the European Council of 29 November 2005 updated the list of these organizations,

== Outside the CFSP ==
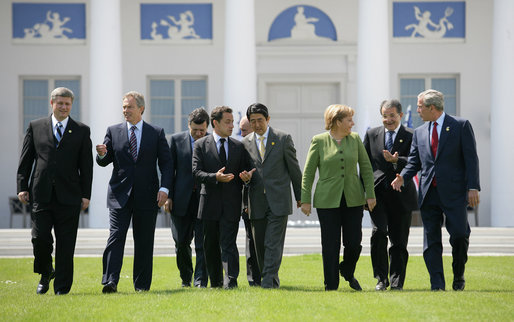
The Commission President has been an unofficial member of the G8, since 2014 G7 since the 3rd summit in 1977 (Shown: G8 at Heiligendamm, Germany in 2007)

Besides its own foreign and security policy, the commission is also gaining greater representation in international bodies. Representation in international bodies is previously through the European Commissioner for External Relations, who worked alongside the High Representative, but now with the High Representative directly as a Commission vice-president. In the UN the EU has gained influence in areas such as aid due to its large contributions in that field (see below).

In the G8 and the G20, the EU has the rights of membership besides that of chairing/hosting summit meetings. The EU is represented at the G8 by the presidents of the commission and the council. At the G20, its exact representation depends on the format of the individual meetings and may also include officials from the ECB. For all of these meetings, the EU has established informal processes to coordinate its policies. In the World Trade Organisation (WTO), where all 27 member states are represented, the EU as a body is represented by Trade Commissioner.

The influence of the EU is also felt through the enlargement. The potential benefits of becoming a member of the EU act as an incentive for both political and economic reform in states wishing to fulfil the EU's accession criteria, and are considered a major factor contributing to the reform and stabilisation of former Communist countries in Eastern Europe. This influence on the internal affairs of other countries is generally referred to as "soft power", as opposed to military "hard power".

An example of the support the European Union offers to the reform processes of its neighbours is EUBAM, the European Union Border Assistance Mission to Moldova and Ukraine, which assists the governments of Moldova and Ukraine in approximating their border and customs procedures to EU standards.

The European Union's influential economic status and its nation-like characteristics has been acknowledged by the United States' Central Intelligence Agency (CIA) in their publication The World Factbook. The EU was included in the Factbook in December 2004.

=== Humanitarian aid ===
The European Community humanitarian aid office, or "ECHO", provides humanitarian aid from the EU to developing countries. In 2006 its budget amounted to 671 million euro, 48% of which went to the ACP countries. Counting the EU's own contributions and those of its member states together, the EU is the largest aid donor in the world.

The EU's aid has previously been criticised by the think-tank Open Europe for being inefficient, mis-targeted and linked to economic objectives. Some charities have claimed European governments have inflated the amount they have spent on aid by incorrectly including money spent on debt relief, foreign students, and refugees. Under the de-inflated figures, the EU did not reach its internal aid target in 2006 and the EU would not reach the international target of 0.7% of GNP until 2015. However, only a few countries have reached that target. In 2005, EU aid was 0.34% of GNP, which was higher than that of the United States and Japan. Louis Michel, the former commissioner for aid, has called for aid to be delivered more rapidly, to greater effect, and on humanitarian principles.
