= European Personnel Recovery Centre =

- Active: 8 July 2015
- Country: Belgium; France; Italy; Netherlands; Spain; United Kingdom
- Type: Personnel recovery
- Role: multinational defence resource organisation
- Motto: That others may live
- Website: eprc.org

The European Personnel Recovery Centre (EPRC) is an intergovernmental military organisation that contributes to the development and harmonisation of policies and standards related to personnel recovery. The EPRC also provides support for education, training, exercises and operations. The EPRC was established on 8 July 2015 and is based at Poggio Renatico Air Base in Italy.

== Member states ==
The centre has six participating states:

- Belgium
- France
- Italy
- Netherlands
- Spain
- United Kingdom

The EPRC is not associated with the European Union Common Security and Defence Policy, CSDP); it is for instance not a project of the Permanent Structured Cooperation (PESCO) of the CSDP. The EPRC and its assets may however contribute in the implementation of the CSDP, when made available as a multinational force in accordance with article 42.3 of the Treaty on European Union (TEU).

== Structure ==
=== Leadership ===
The EPRC is presently led by:

- Director
- Commander

=== Components ===
The EPCR comprises the following components:

- The Concept and Document Management division, which develops, reviews and maintains concepts, doctrine, directives and initiatives aimed to harmonise personnel recovery policy, doctrine and standards as directed by the EPRC Commander.
- The Education and Training Area, which supports the development and conduct of courses and training events for commanders, staffs and recovery forces.
- The Operations Advice and Assistance and Lessons Identified/Lessons Learned (OAA/LI/LL) Section, which supports the participating states and international organisations with joint personnel recovery expertise in support of exercises and operations.
- The Survival, Evasion, Resistance and Extraction (SERE) Section, developing and promoting relevant forms of standardisation and providing a forum for participant states' SERE schools.

== Relationship with EU defence policy ==
The EPRC is presently not established at the EU level (referred to as the Common Security and Defence Policy, CSDP); it is for instance not a project of the Permanent Structured Cooperation (PESCO) of the CSDP. The EPRC and its assets may however contribute in the implementation of the CSDP, when made available as a multinational force in accordance with article 42.3 of the Treaty on European Union (TEU).

== See also ==
- Joint Personnel Recovery Agency
- European Air Group
- Finabel
- European Air Transport Command
- Common Security and Defence Policy
  - European Medical Command
  - European Medical Corps
- United States Air Force Pararescue, a US military unit employing the same motto
