= E6 format =

Proposed "two-speed" European Union format to accelerate defence cooperation (2026)

The E6 format is a proposed mechanism for faster coordination among a core group of European Union (EU) member states on defence spending and related industrial-policy priorities. The initiative was reported in late January 2026 as being spearheaded by Germany and launched in a meeting of finance ministers from Germany, France, Italy, the Netherlands, Poland, and Spain. The proposal has been described as a "two-speed" approach intended to bypass slower consensus-based decision-making among all 27 EU member states for selected priorities, especially defence-related efforts.

== Background ==
European debates about "multi-speed" or "two-speed" integration have periodically resurfaced in response to institutional constraints, including unanimity requirements in certain policy areas. In early 2026, the "two-speed" framing was reported in connection with calls to accelerate European defence cooperation and to reduce reliance on the United States for defence capabilities.

== Proposal ==
=== Launch meeting and agenda ===
According to reporting, the E6 format was initiated through a video conference on 28 January 2026 convened by German Finance Minister Lars Klingbeil and French minister Roland Lescure with their counterparts from Poland, Spain, Italy, and the Netherlands. In an invitation letter cited by media outlets, Klingbeil outlined a four-point agenda that included: (1) higher defence spending, (2) a savings and investment union, (3) strengthening the euro, and (4) securing critical raw materials.

The initiative was described as aiming to make defence a central priority in the next EU multiannual budget and to treat defence spending as an economic driver as well as a security requirement.

=== Membership ===
As reported, the initial E6 group comprises:

- Germany
- France
- Italy
- Netherlands
- Poland
- Spain

== Related defence and industrial initiatives ==
Media coverage linked the E6 initiative to broader German efforts to deepen bilateral and regional defence cooperation. These included a reported German–Italian protocol on strategic cooperation signed in late January 2026, with areas of cooperation said to include integrated air and missile defence, unmanned systems, naval projects, and electronic warfare, as well as discussion of a common land-combat platform.

Reporting also referenced German plans for closer cooperation with Poland, including work toward a new defence policy agreement expected to be concluded in 2026 and expanded collaboration on joint exercises and counter-drone capabilities.

== Reception and concerns ==
Commentary on the proposal noted that a faster core-group approach could risk political friction within the EU by sidelining member states that support deeper integration but are not part of the initial group. German officials were reported to have described the format as flexible and potentially open to additional participants over time.

== Broader security context ==
In early January 2026, European leaders issued statements emphasizing sovereignty and self-determination in the Arctic context, including the position that only Greenland and Denmark can decide Greenland’s future, after renewed public pressure from the U.S. president regarding the Danish territory. While this episode is distinct from EU institutional debates, it was reported amid heightened attention to European security, defence readiness, and transatlantic relations.

== See also ==
- Multi-speed Europe
- Enhanced cooperation
- Permanent Structured Cooperation
- Common Security and Defence Policy
- European Defence Fund
