= CybExer Technologies =

Estonian cybersecurity company

- Type: Private limited company
- Industry: Cybersecurity
- Founded: 2016; 10 years ago
- Founders: Andrus Kivisaar; Lauri Almann
- Headquarters: Tallinn, Estonia
- Key people: Andrus Kivisaar (CEO); Lauri Almann (chairman)
- Products: Cyber range software
- Revenue: €5,896,721 (2024)
- Net income: €65,239 (2024)
- Website: cybexer.com

CybExer Technologies is an Estonian cybersecurity company based in Tallinn. Founded in 2016, it develops cyber ranges, virtual environments used for cybersecurity training and testing.

== History ==
The company was registered in Estonia on 14 March 2016. Its co-founders include Andrus Kivisaar and Lauri Almann.

In 2017, a €300,000 cyber-hygiene research project led by CybExer received 70 per cent co-funding from the European Regional Development Fund. The project also involved Tallinn University of Technology and received technical assistance from the European Defence Agency to secure the funding.

In 2018, CybExer was one of ten winners of the NATO Communications and Information Agency's Defence Innovation Challenge, in the data visualisation category.

In February 2022, the company raised €5 million in a funding round led by Karma Ventures, with participation from First Fellow Partners, Specialist VC and angel investors.

The company subsequently obtained €1.5 million in venture debt financing from SEB, announced in December 2024.

== Technology and projects ==
CybExer's software is offered as a service and for on-premises deployment. Its tools support the deployment of virtual training environments, exercise monitoring and participant scoring.

In April 2020, the company provided an online cyber-hygiene course to cadets at Ukraine's National Academy of Internal Affairs and made it freely available to the public in 13 languages.

In November 2020, the NATO Support and Procurement Agency awarded CybExer a three-year contract to supply a cyber range for Luxembourg's Directorate of Defence. The contract also covered training, operation and maintenance of the range. Delivery was completed in 2021.

In January 2022, CybExer supplied the cyber range and supported the preparation, execution and evaluation of a European Defence Agency exercise for military computer emergency response teams. The exercise involved more than 200 experts from 19 EDA member states and Switzerland.

The company is also a member of the consortium for CITADEL Range, a European Defence Fund project coordinated by Estonia's CR14 to develop cyber ranges for military training and mission rehearsal.
