= OCEAN2020 =

EU defence project

The OCEAN2020 initiative, signed in late March 2018, is a technology demonstration project funded by the European Union's Preparatory Action on Defence Research and implemented by the European Defence Agency.

Funded by the European Union's Preparatory Action on Defence Research and implemented by the European Defence Agency, the project aims at building up a Recognised Maritime Picture to secure maritime dominance, through the integration of data from multiple sources and unmanned systems in existing fleets.

With a 35 million budget, the 3-year project is aimed to solve the problems of integrating EU systems as well as integrating the individual organizations into a team.

The team involving 42 entities, from enterprises to startups, is drawn from 15 countries across Europe with end users of some European Navies such as Italian, Lithuanian Navy, Portuguese, Hellenic and Spanish MoD.
