= Strategic autonomy =

Ability of a state to act without outside help

Strategic autonomy is defined as the ability of a state to pursue its national interests and adopt its preferred foreign policy without depending heavily on other foreign states.

In the European context, strategic autonomy is the ability of the European Union (EU) to not be overly reliant on the United States, defend Europe, and act militarily for the strategic purposes of affording a political autonomy independent from US foreign policies. The concept has become prominent amid the 2020s European rearmament forced by the Russian invasion of Ukraine and US threats to invade Greenland.

== Within the European Union ==
=== History ===
Strategic autonomy
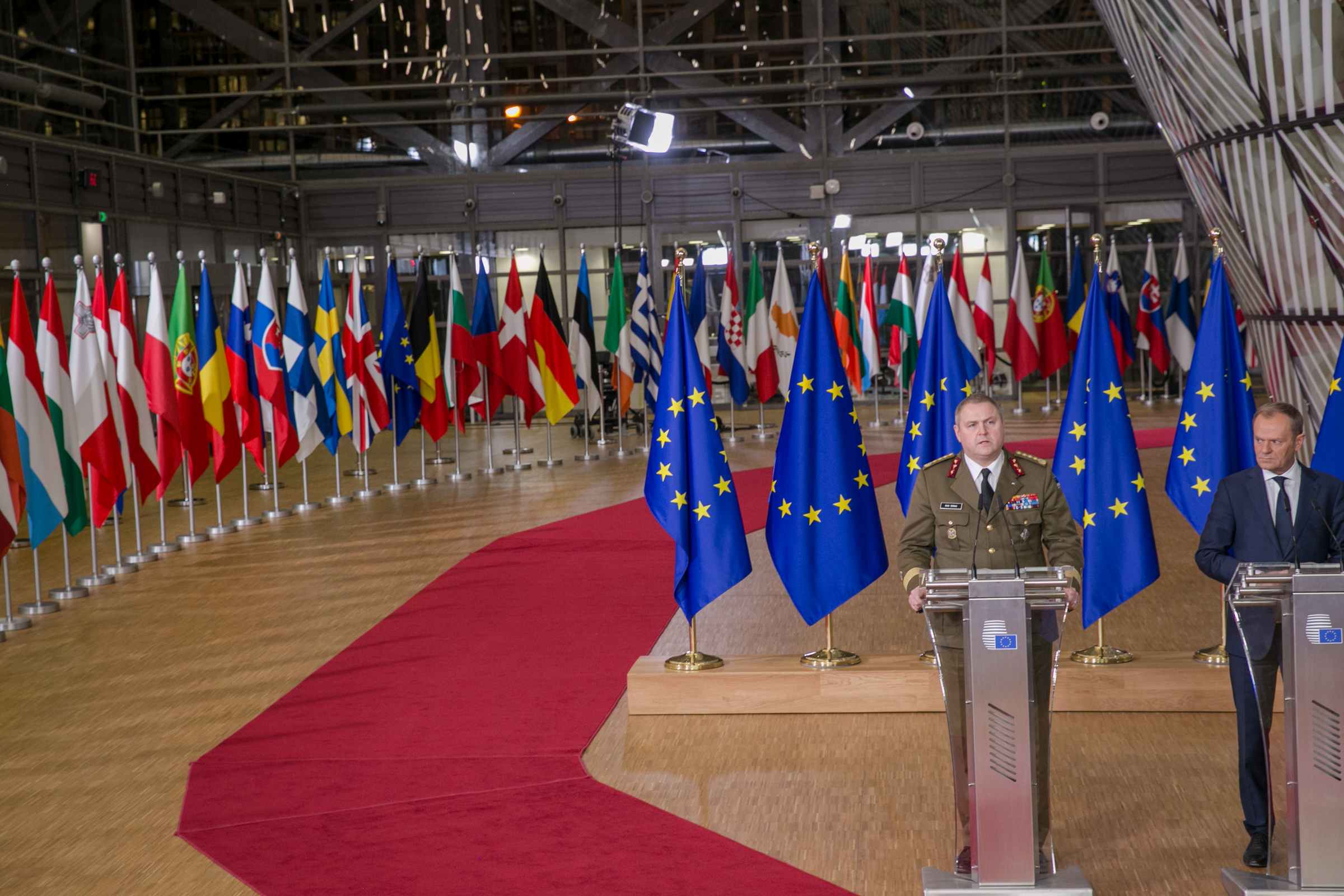
- European Council, 2017
- Date: 2016–present
- Theme: Geopolitical great power competition
- Participants: EU

An early reference to strategic autonomy in the discussions of the European Council can be dated back to December 2013, when it called for the development of European defense capabilities to enhance the strategic autonomy of the EU.

In 2016, strategic autonomy became part of the European Union Global Strategy doctrine to improve the EU's defense capabilities, including the creation of a European Defence Fund in 2017. Strategic autonomy also became central to the European Commission, led by Ursula von der Leyen. Members of the Von der Leyen Commission, including Josep Borrell and Thierry Breton, claimed that Europe's soft power needs to be complemented by a harder power dimension. In 2025 Von der Leyen unveiled the Readiness 2030 strategic defence initiative to mobilise up to €800 billion to strengthen Europe's defence infrastructure.

After the 2020 US presidential election, France's Emmanuel Macron advocated for European strategic autonomy. Strategic autonomy for the EU is a concept that includes economic, energy and digital policy, although other EU member states display different preferences than France when it comes to the priorities of a strategic autonomy policy. Strategic autonomy expanded to digital policy to ascertain European sovereignty against China. As early as December 2020, strategic autonomy was a priority in European defense policy. This was professed by High Representative of the European Union for Foreign Affairs and Security Policy Josep Borrell, who saw Donald Trump as an unreliable partner in a retrospective speech. The goal of strategic autonomy was not to act alone militarily and to characterize the EU as non-interventionist. The election of Joe Biden in the United States brought expectations of a Euro-Atlantic unity to be reconciled with the strategic autonomy of the EU. The New York Times saw Biden's election bringing discord between France and Germany over the future of European defense and strategic autonomy. In November 2021, the Biden administration urged the EU to develop its own credible military capabilities.

The 2022 Russian invasion of Ukraine was perceived by Macron as an attack on the institutions of the EU and a test of European strategic autonomy. On 2 December 2022, Finnish Prime Minister Sanna Marin said that Europe must strengthen its defenses because they are currently "not strong enough" to stand up to Russia's invasion of Ukraine alone, and have been relying on American support.

In April 2023, after a three-day state visit to China, Macron called for the EU to reduce its dependence on the US to attain European strategic autonomy away from Washington and avoid being drawn into a confrontation between the US and China over Taiwan. Macron had also advocated that Europe should become a "third superpower." According to Macron, Europe should focus on boosting its own defense industries and on reducing dependence on the extraterritoriality of the US dollar.

=== Initiatives ===
The EU established the European Defence Fund in 2017 to coordinate and increase national investment in defence research and improve interoperability between national armed forces, and launched the Permanent Structured Cooperation in 2018 to pursue the structural military integration of member states. It later passed legislation, including the 2023 European Chips Act and 2024 Critical Raw Materials Act, to encourage resource development and production domestically.

Further European grand projects to reinforce autonomy include: Gaia-X, which has developed a federated secure standard for data infrastructure; IRIS², a planned multi-orbit satellite internet constellation to be deployed by the EU by 2027; and the European Payments Initiative, which allows European consumers and merchants to bypass US-based payment corporations such as Visa and Mastercard.

== See also ==
- Trade and Technology Council
- European army
- Client state
- Satellite state
