= 2022 Madrid NATO summit =

2022 NATO summit meeting in Spain

NATO Summit Madrid 2022 Madrid Summit•Sommet 29–30 VI 2022
- Host country: Spain
- Date: 29–30 June 2022
- Cities: Madrid
- Venues: Institución Ferial de Madrid
- Follows: 2022 Brussels extraordinary summit
- Precedes: 2023 Vilnius summit

The 2022 Madrid summit was a meeting of the heads of state and heads of government of the thirty members of the North Atlantic Treaty Organization (NATO), their partner countries, and the European Union, held in Madrid, Spain, on 29–30 June 2022. Spain previously hosted a NATO Summit in 1997.

== Background ==
On 8 October 2021, following a meeting with NATO secretary general Jens Stoltenberg, Spanish prime minister Pedro Sánchez announced the celebration of the ordinary summit in Madrid in 2022, a date otherwise underscoring the 40th anniversary of Spain's NATO membership. NATO disclosed the summit's logo on 29 March 2022. The meeting was scheduled to occur several months after the Russian invasion of Ukraine. The summit also addressed the membership applications of Finland and Sweden, as well as Turkey's objections to these applications.

== Summit ==
In the wake of the two days of preparation for the summit in mid June 2022, Jens Stoltenberg reported that key areas to be addressed in the summit include "strengthened deterrence and defence; support for Ukraine and other partners at risk; a new NATO Strategic Concept; better burden-sharing and resourcing; and Finland and Sweden's historic applications for membership".

=== Venue and security ===
The summit was held at Pavilions 9 and 10 of the IFEMA fairgrounds. Over 25,000 police agents were deployed in the city. The celebration of Madrid's LGBT Pride was postponed one week due to the summit. The Spanish Ministries of Interior and Foreign Affairs allocated around €37 million without public tender for security enhancement of the summit, including the acquisition of 6,000 taser chargers.

=== 2022 Strategic Concept ===
NATO's strategic concept, the 10-year blueprint underpinning the alliance's security challenges in the evolving global landscape and outlining the NATO political and military tasks set to address them, was adopted at the summit, thereby replacing the strategic concept adopted at the 2010 Lisbon summit. The 2010 document makes mention of "peace in the Euro-Atlantic area" and "the threat of a conventional attack on NATO territory [being] low", showing the outdated nature of the previous strategic concept. Gitanas Nausėda, the president of Lithuania, wants the next strategic concept to consider Russia a "long-term threat to the entire Euro-Atlantic area." The United States hopes the document will also have forceful language on China.

The strategic blueprint updated Russia's status (hitherto considered a "strategic partner") as the "most significant and direct threat to Allies' security and to peace and stability in the Euro-Atlantic area". Likewise, China was described in the document as a challenge to allies' "interests, security and values".

=== EU–NATO interactions ===
On 29 June, leaders of member states from both the European Union and NATO attended a dinner hosted by Spanish Prime Minister Pedro Sánchez in Madrid. During the summit, Irish Taoiseach Micheál Martin met bileraterally with Norwegian Prime Minister Jonas Gahr Støre, Icelandic Prime Minister Katrín Jakobsdóttir, and Austrian Chancellor Karl Nehammer, the latter of which also met with Turkish President Recep Tayyip Erdoğan.

=== Finnish and Swedish accession bids ===
Finland and Sweden NATO

In the wake of the Russian invasion of Ukraine and a subsequent tilt in the public opinion of Finland and Sweden, the prospect of both countries applying for NATO membership before the summit was raised. On 12 May, Sauli Niinistö and Sanna Marin, respectively the president and prime minister of Finland, issued a joint statement that "Finland must apply for NATO membership without delay". On 16 May, Magdalena Andersson, prime minister of Sweden, announced that Sweden will apply for membership. Both countries submitted their NATO applications on 18 May, yet there was the looming prospect of a Turkish block to accession talks, reportedly over concerns related to Finnish and Swedish relations with the YPG, which Turkey considers a Syrian branch of the PKK. On 19 May, Finnish President Niinistö and Swedish Prime Minister Andersson announced that they were ready to address Turkey's security concerns and that they always condemned terrorism.

On 28 June, the first day of the summit, the Turkish delegation dropped their opposition to Finland and Sweden's NATO membership applications and signed a tripartite memorandum addressing Turkey's concerns regarding arms exports and the Kurdish–Turkish conflict. As part of the agreement, Finland and Sweden will support Turkey's participation in PESCO's Military Mobility project. Finland and Sweden also affirmed that the Kurdistan Workers' Party (PKK) is "a terrorist organization". On 29 June, NATO extended a formal invitation to Finland and Sweden to join the alliance. On 30 June, Turkish President Recep Tayyip Erdoğan said that Sweden had made a "promise" to extradite "73 terrorists" to Turkey. Swedish Prime Minister Andersson refused to deny Turkey's claim that Sweden had promised to deport political refugees and opponents wanted by Erdoğan's government.

=== Regional defense ===
Ahead of the summit, the Bucharest Nine made a joint declaration on 10 June 2022, calling for forward defense in NATO's eastern flank. The summit may also see the alliance expand the NATO Response Force from 40,000 to "well over 300,000". Kaja Kallas, the prime minister of Estonia, hopes that NATO will increase its troop presence with a division of 20,000 to 25,000 soldiers in each of the Baltic states to defend the territory of each state against a potential Russian invasion. Meanwhile, Nausėda's looking to increase the Baltic contingent to the size of a brigade, much less than what Kallas called for. Under preexisting plans, only about a thousand foreign soldiers are present in each state. The Spanish government wants NATO to also consider regional security to the south, particularly concerning migration from Africa, Islamist groups in the Sahel, and Russian mercenaries operating in the region.

On 29 June, the second day of the summit, United States President Joe Biden announced that the US would establish a permanent military base in Poland that would serve as the headquarters of V Corps and provide two additional F-35 squadrons in the United Kingdom, another brigade in Romania, and air defense systems in Italy and Germany. The White House also reported a 50% increase (4 to 6) in the number of Arleigh Burke-class destroyers deployed in Naval Station Rota.

On 30 June, British Prime Minister, Boris Johnson, announced the United Kingdom's defence spending would increase from 2.3% of GDP in 2022 to 2.5% of GDP in 2030. The UK will also provide 1000 additional troops and a Queen Elizabeth-class aircraft carrier to NATO's Eastern flank.

== Protests ==
On 26 June 2022, several thousand people gathered in Madrid to protest against NATO, calling for the dissolution of the organisation and the closure of US military bases in Spain. A protest planned for the first day of the summit was banned by the Spanish government.

== Participants ==
Heads of State, heads of Government, Ministers of Foreign Affairs and Ministers of Defence from a total of forty-eight countries (thirty-four in Europe, nine in Asia, two in North America, two in Oceania and one in Africa) plus the European Union were invited to participate in the Summit.

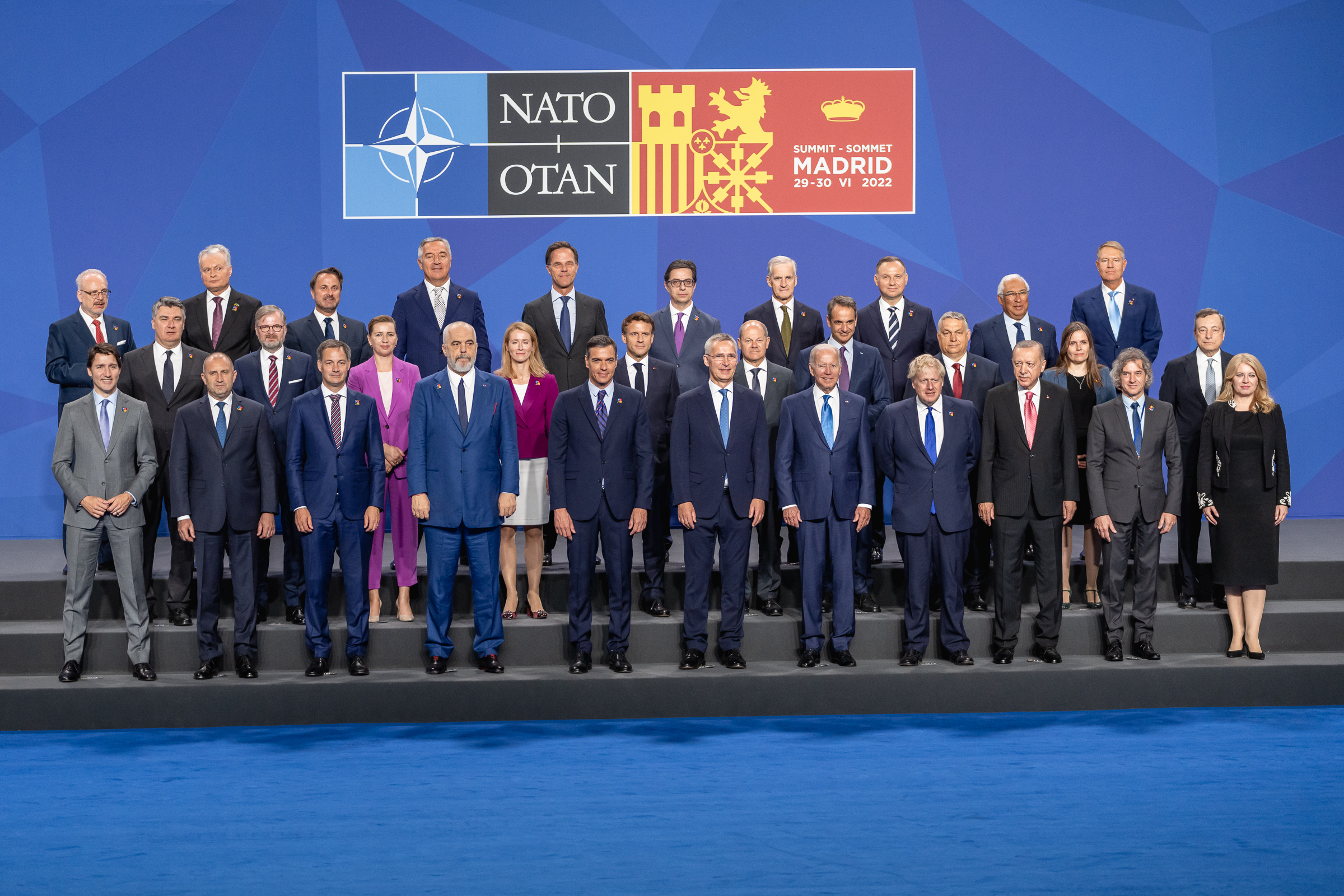
Family photo of the 2022 Madrid summit.

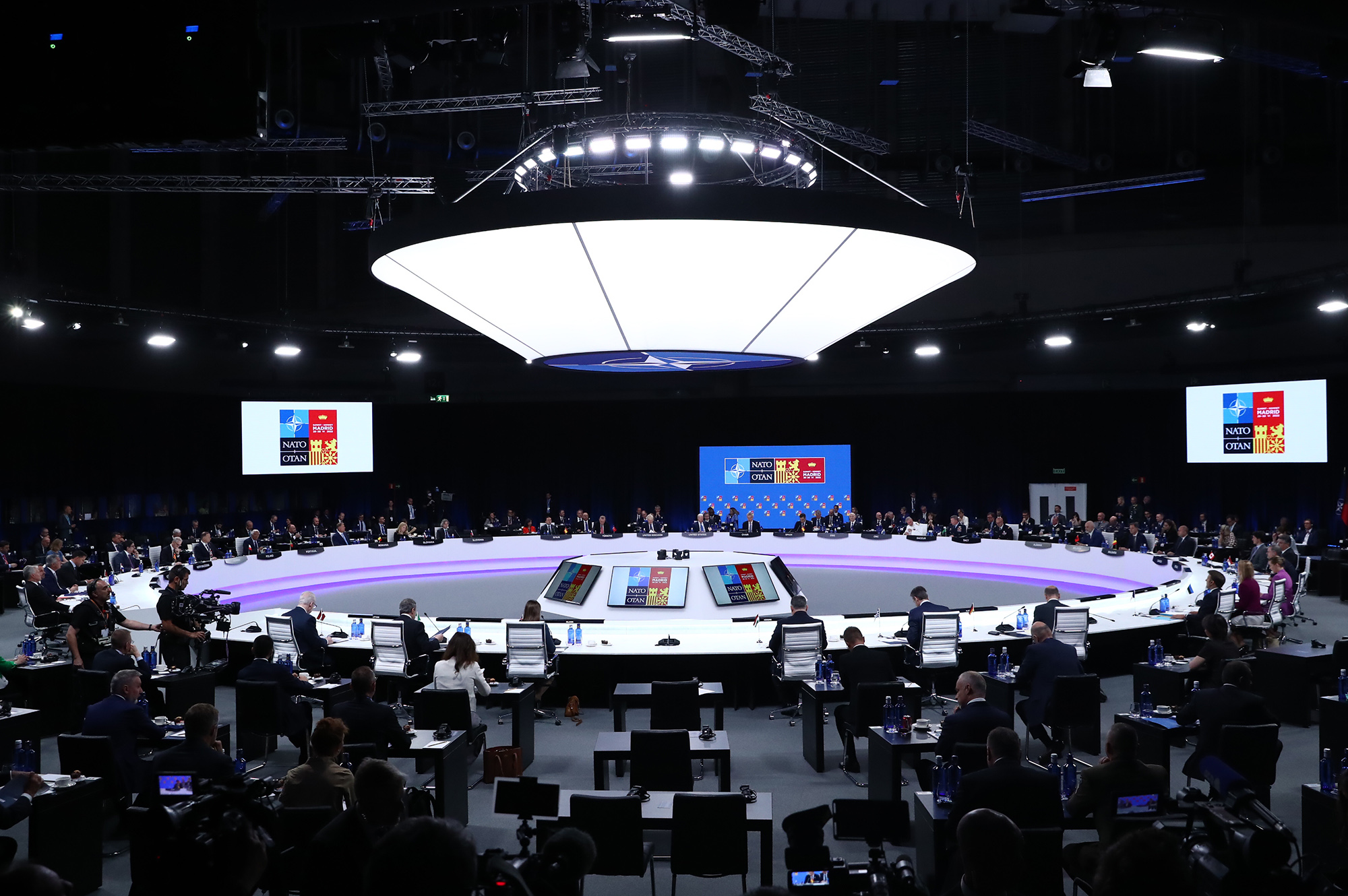
Working session of the leaders in the facilities of IFEMA in Madrid.

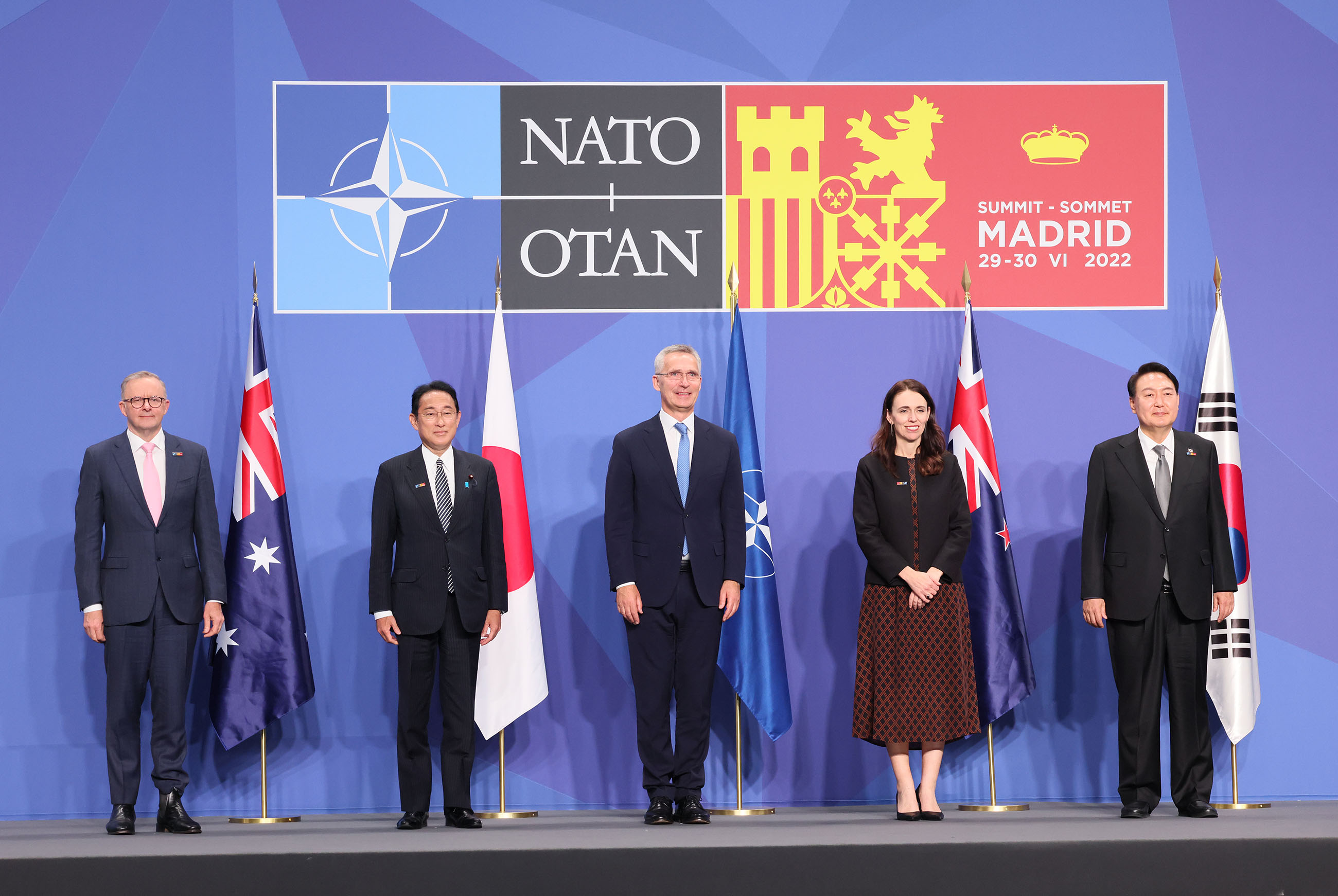
Jens Stoltenberg with Pacific countries which are NATO global partners

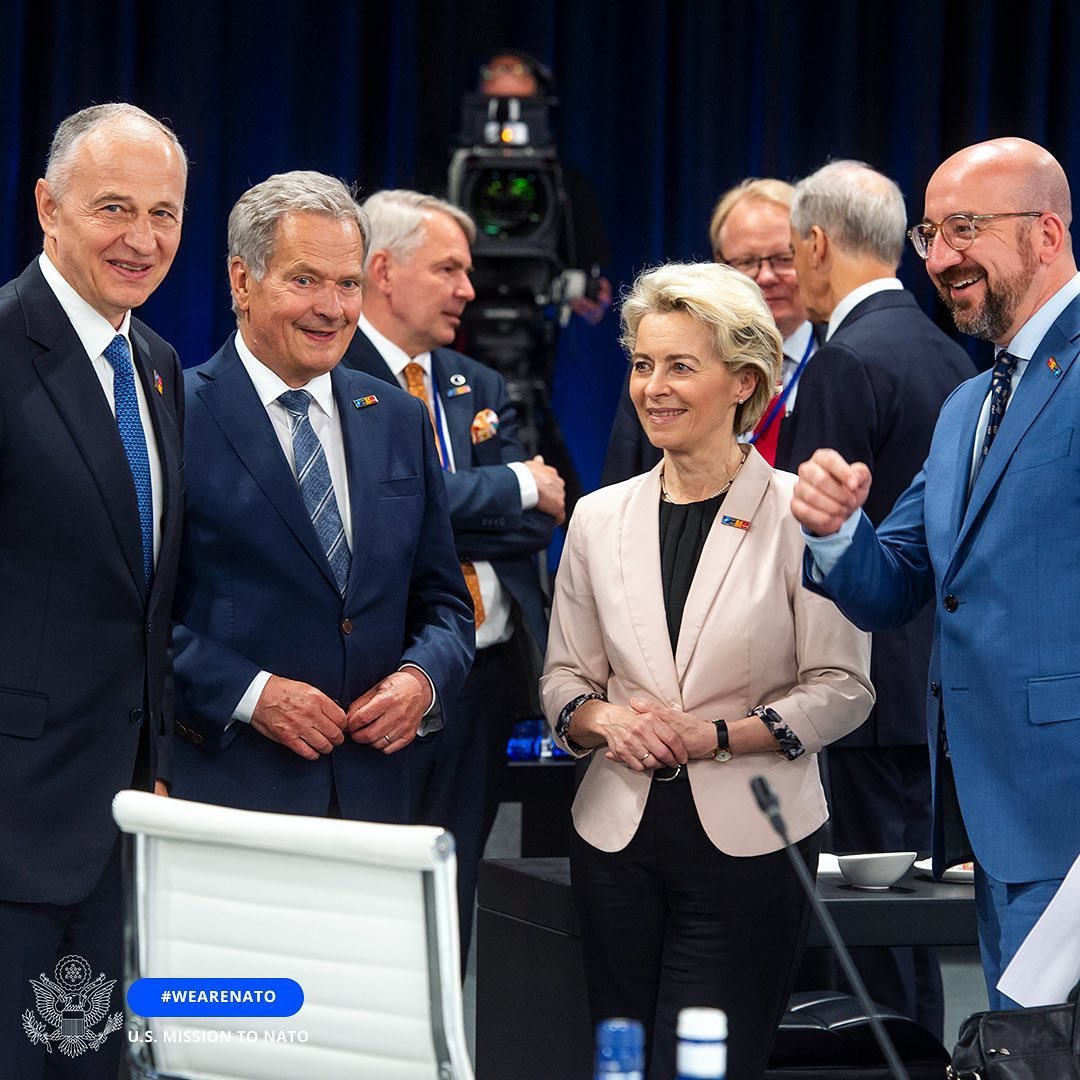
Sauli Niinistö with Ursula von der Leyen and others EU officials

Key
Non-NATO member

Country or organization	Head of Delegation	Title	Ref.
NATO	Jens Stoltenberg	Secretary General	
Albania	Edi Rama	Prime Minister	
Australia (Note: Australia, Austria, Cyprus, Finland, Georgia, Ireland, Japan, Malta, New Zealand, the Philippines, South Korea, Sweden, the Republic of China (Taiwan) and Thailand were not member states of NATO but were invited to attend and participate in the summit. The presidents of the European Council and European Commission were also invited, as well as the ministers of Jordan, Mauritania and Bosnia and Herzegovina.)	Anthony Albanese	Prime Minister	
Austria	Karl Nehammer	Chancellor	
Belgium	Alexander De Croo	Prime Minister	
Bosnia and Herzegovina			
Bulgaria	Rumen Radev	President	
Canada	Justin Trudeau	Prime Minister	
Croatia	Zoran Milanović	President	
Cyprus	Nikos Anastasiadis	President	
Czech Republic	Petr Fiala	Prime Minister	
Denmark	Mette Frederiksen	Prime Minister	
Estonia	Kaja Kallas	Prime Minister	
European Union	Charles Michel	Council President	
European Union	Ursula von der Leyen	Commission President	
Finland	Sauli Niinistö	President	
France	Emmanuel Macron	President	
Georgia	Irakli Garibashvili	Prime Minister	
Germany	Olaf Scholz	Chancellor	
Greece	Kyriakos Mitsotakis	Prime Minister	
Hungary	Viktor Orbán	Prime Minister	
Iceland	Katrín Jakobsdóttir	Prime Minister	
Ireland	Micheál Martin	Taoiseach	
Italy	Mario Draghi	Prime Minister	
Japan	Fumio Kishida	Prime Minister	
Jordan			
Latvia	Egils Levits	President	
Lithuania	Gitanas Nausėda	President	
Luxembourg	Xavier Bettel	Prime Minister	
Malta	Robert Abela	Prime Minister	
Mauritania			
Montenegro	Milo Đukanović	President	
Netherlands	Mark Rutte	Prime Minister	
New Zealand	Jacinda Ardern	Prime Minister	
North Macedonia	Stevo Pendarovski	President	
Norway	Jonas Gahr Støre	Prime Minister	
Philippines	Rodrigo Duterte	President	
Poland	Andrzej Duda	President	
Portugal	António Costa	Prime Minister	
Romania	Klaus Iohannis	President	
Slovakia	Zuzana Čaputová	President	
Slovenia	Robert Golob	Prime Minister	
South Korea	Yoon Suk-yeol	President	
Spain	Pedro Sánchez (host)	Prime Minister	
Sweden	Magdalena Andersson	Prime Minister	
Thailand	Prayut Chan-o-cha	Prime Minister	
Turkey	Recep Tayyip Erdoğan	President	
Ukraine (Note: President Zelenskyy was invited to the summit and made an appearance via video link.)	Volodymyr Zelenskyy	President	
United Kingdom	Boris Johnson	Prime Minister	
United States	Joe Biden	President	

== Other events ==
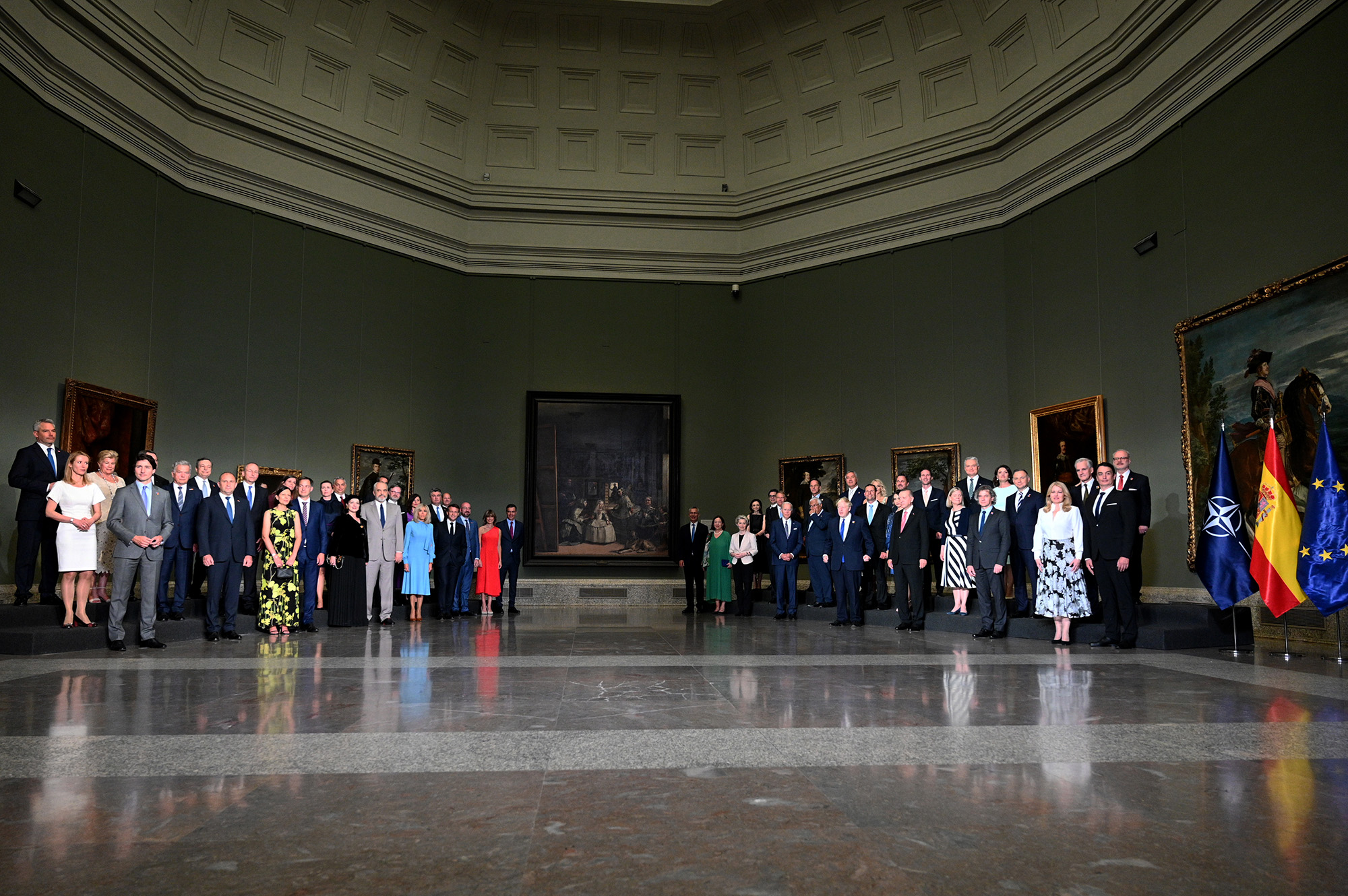
Family photo of the dignitaries and their companions at the Museo del Prado with Las Meninas.

On the evening of 28 June 2022, King Felipe VI and Queen Letizia welcomed the heads of State and Government and their companions at the Royal Palace, where they hosted a state dinner, as the opening of the summit. That same evening, the Spanish Minister of Foreign Affairs José Manuel Albares and the Spanish Minister of Defence Margarita Robles, received their counterparts at the Santa Cruz Palace, where they hosted a welcome dinner by chef José Andrés.

On the evening of 29 June, Prime Minister Pedro Sánchez received the heads of State and Government and their companions at the Museo del Prado, where they held an informal working dinner at the cloister of Saint Jerome, also by chef José Andrés, while their companions dined in another room of the museum. That same evening, the Ministers of Foreign Affairs and the Ministers of Defence held informal working dinners at the Santa Cruz Palace.

During the summit, Queen Letizia held several private events and visits for the dignitaries' companions. These included visits to the Royal Palace of La Granja de San Ildefonso, the Royal Factory of Glass and Crystal of La Granja, the Museo Nacional Centro de Arte Reina Sofía and the Teatro Real.

== See also ==
- 48th G7 summit
- Government and intergovernmental reactions to the 2022 Russian invasion of Ukraine
- Second Cold War
- 1997 NATO Madrid summit
