= Coordinated Annual Review on Defence =

European Union process

The Coordinated Annual Review on Defence (CARD) is a process of monitoring the defence plans of European Union (EU) member states to help coordinate spending and identify possible collaborative projects. It has operated on a test basis since 2017 under the European Defence Agency (EDA), in cooperation with the European External Action Service (EEAS). After a first trial run in 2017/2018, the first full implementation of CARD was launched in autumn 2019 and completed in November 2020 with a final report submitted to Defence Ministers meeting in EDA’s Steering Board.

Together with Permanent Structured Cooperation (PESCO) and the European Defence Fund (EDF), it forms a new comprehensive defence package for the EU.

== First full CARD cycle (2019–2020) ==
In 2019–2020, the first full CARD cycle took place with EDA acting as the CARD penholder. The final CARD report was presented to Defence Ministers in November 2020. It identifies a total of 55 collaborative opportunities throughout the whole capability spectrum and 56 options to cooperate in R&T.

== Second CARD cycle (2021–2022) ==
The second CARD cycle will be launched in December 2021 when each Member State will meet individually with EDA and the EUMS to discuss their defence profile and related plans for the future in the EU context. A new CARD report is expected for November 2022.

== Reception ==
In a chapter on Common Security and Defence Policy capabilities, Dick Zandee highlights the CARD's purely intergovernmental and strictly voluntary basis raises doubts as to its potential contribution to a more cohesive European approach to defence.

== See also ==
- Common Security and Defence Policy
- European Defence Agency
- European Defence Fund
- Military of the European Union
- Permanent Structured Cooperation
