= Crisis Response Operation Core =

- Lead Nation Participant Observer Other PESCO states
- Country: European Union
- Allegiance: European Union
- Part of: Permanent Structured Cooperation

The Crisis Response Operation Core (CROC) is a flagship European Union defence project under development as part of Permanent Structured Cooperation (PESCO). CROC will contribute to the creation of a "full spectrum force package" to speed up provision of military forces and the EU's crisis management capabilities. CROC is intended to be a 60,000 head military force composed of three divisions of four battalions each. The lead nations in 2017 were France, Germany, Italy and Spain.

== Mission ==
Rather than creating a standing force, the project involves creating a concrete catalogue of military force elements that would speed up the establishment of a force when the EU decides to launch an operation. It is land-focused and aims to generate a force of 60,000 troops from the contributing states alone. While it does not establish any form of "European army", it foresees a deployable, interoperable force under a single command.

== Notable partners ==
Germany is leading the project, but France is also heavily involved as the subject is tied to President Emmanuel Macron's proposal to create a standing intervention force. France views this project as an example of what the Permanent Structured Cooperation (PESCO) is all about.

As of September 2021, Cyprus, France, Germany, Greece, Italy, and Spain are participating in CROC, and other member states could join.

== Core participating states ==
- Germany - project coordinator
- Netherlands
- Austria
- Cyprus
- France
- Greece
- Italy
- Spain

Observers

- Belgium
- Czech Republic
- Portugal
- Slovenia

== See also ==
- European Union Military Staff
  - Military Planning and Conduct Capability
- Permanent Structured Cooperation
