= Multinational Medical Coordination Centre/European Medical Command =

Multinational Medical Coordination Centre - Europe (MMCC-E)
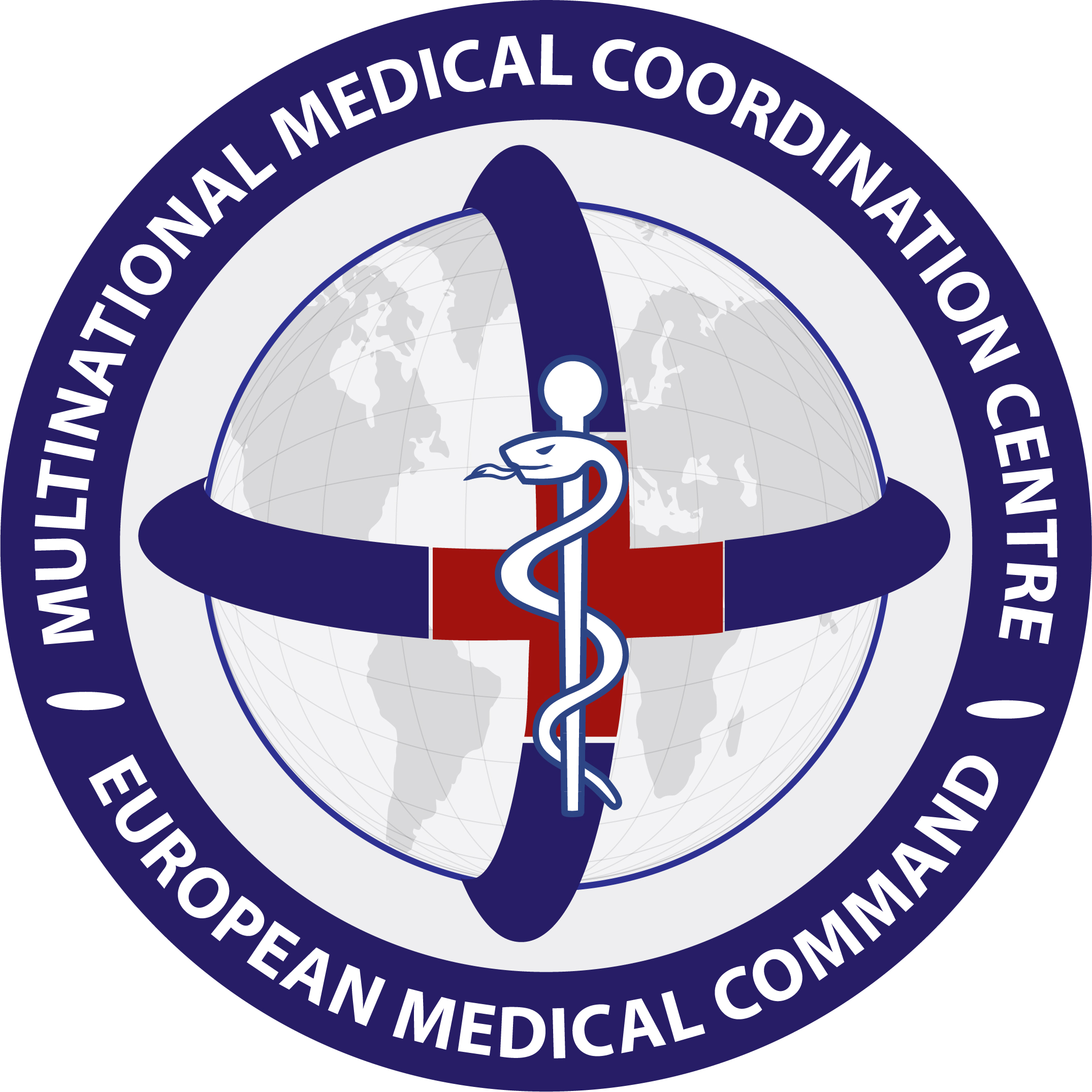
- Coat of arms of the MMCC-E
- Active: April 2018
- Country: Germany, Rhineland-Palatinate
- Allegiance: European Medical Services (DoI)
- Type: Medical Unit
- Garrison/HQ: Rhein-Kaserne, Koblenz
- Motto: "Combining Efforts in Medical Support"

Commanders
- Current commander: Brigadier General (PhD, MA) Rolf von Uslar

The Multinational Medical Coordination Centre-Europe (MMCC-E) is a medical coordinating centre in support of the European medical services. It is directly subordinated to the German Armed Forces' Joint Medical Service Command and the German Surgeon General. It was formed on 1 April 2018 in the Rhine-Barracks, Koblenz, Germany, where it also has its HQ.

== History ==
On 2 May 2017, the Surgeons General from eight European NATO member states signed a fundamental document towards an intensified and sustainable cooperation within the context of NATO's Framework Nations Concept (FNC) Cluster Medical Support. After signing this Declaration of Intent at the cornerstone-laying ceremony at the Ehrenbreitstein Fortress in Koblenz, Germany, a collective planning and coordinating unit for European Armed Forces was going to be formed - the Multinational Medical Coordination Centre. To support the collaboration of Medical Commands on a multinational level in an effective and goal-oriented way, this Multinational Coordination Centre was set up under the lead management of the German Armed Forces Joint Medical Service Command and is run together with all participating nations. The multinational staffed department started working in April 2018. In the following year, the cooperation with the Centre of Excellence in Military Medicine (MilMedCoE) regarding some fields was intensified. Also, the British Defence Medical Service (DMS) joined the MMCC as the then ninth member.

In 2019, the PESCO project European Medical Command (EMC) was assigned to the MMCC by the German Surgeon General. This meant virtually merging both projects into one entity, and setting up staff for both at the same time - following the motto "two initiatives – one task". Consequentially, the MMCC/EMC was formed, celebrating its Initial Operation Capability (IOC) on 3 and 4 September with an opening ceremony at the Ehrenbreitstein Fortress and Rhine-Barracks in Koblenz, Germany. Here, the Surgeons General of 14 nations signed a Declaration merging both organizations, the MMCC (NATO/FNC) and EMC (EU/PESCO), into one: MMCC/EMC. This unique department proves the growing cooperation between NATO and the EU. Signing the Declaration of Initial Operational Capability MMCC/EMC during the COMEDs Plenary in Brussels on 27 November 2019, Slovakia became the 15th member nation. In the course of 2020, Poland, Spain and Lithuania also signed the Declaration on the Initial Operational Capability of the MMCC/EMC. In March 2025, Switzerland also joined the alliance with the medical service, while maintaining its neutrality.

In autumn 2023, the representatives of the MMCC/EMC participating nations agreed to change the name to “Multinational Medical Coordination Centre – Europe”, in short “MMCC-E”.

Through its recent agreement with the United States Army, the Multinational Medical Coordination Center - Europe is tightening its network of international contacts once again. On May 11, the 30th Medical Brigade Commander Colonel Jason Wieman and MMCC-E Director Surgeon General Dr. Stefan Kowitz signed the protocol for the assignment of a United States Army Europe and Africa (USAREUR-AF) Liaison Officer to MMCC-E in Koblenz.

The Full Operational Capability (FOC) of the MMCC-E was signed by the nations during the NATO COMEDS Plenary in Madrid on 30 May 2022.

In August 2022, the MMCC-E continued to consolidate its network of international contact points through an agreement with the Confédération Interalliée des Officiers Médicaux de Réserve (CIOMR).

The wargaming exercise which took place in April 2023 focused on a conflict scenario in the context of national and alliance defence. In this exercise, the focus was on the complete evacuation of injured and wounded from the front to their respective home country.

Through a series of medical service simulation games (Medical Wargamings), the MMCC-E has gained a solid reputation. Thus, it influences, for example, the conceptual development of patient transport from conflict zones. The member nations recently discussed what role the MMCC/EMC could play with regard to this in the future.

Another major exercise of the MMCC–E, “Casualty Move 2026” (CAMO26), is going to be conducted in March 2026 and focused on a major joint operation scenario with activation of the collective defence and mutual assistance clauses to train the national echelons of health crises management on bulk patient flow with the prospect of a enhanced civil-military cooperation.”

== Mission ==
The main mission of the MMCC-E is the creation of the necessary conditions for the multinational medical support of Armed Forces within their wide range of tasks, supporting the already growing development towards more international cooperation. It also functions as a catalyst for the field of Capability Enhancement.

Specific tasks include:

- Setting up a resource-saving network of existing and new specialists and coordinating this hub;
- Maintaining a coordinating function in multinational Capability Enhancement within the Framework Nations Concept Cluster Medical Support;
- Working together with military units and NATO departments, the EU and other national and international organizations and task forces in the Medical Capability Enhancement as well as setting up Larger Formations.

== Structure ==
Subordinated to Director MMCC-E

- Directory – Leading/Steering
  - Deputy Director NATO matters
  - Deputy Director EU matters
  - Executive Officer
    - Support Element – Coordination & Support
    - Branch Ops/Plans
    - Branch Wargaming/Exercises
    - Branch Medical Logistics
    - Branch Telehealth/medCBRN
    - Branch Medical Situational Awareness / Civil-Military Interface

== Leadership ==
Director
Nr.	Name	Country	Commencement of post	End of post
3	Brigadier General (MD) Thorsten Schütz	Germany	May 2025	ongoing
3	Brigadier General (MD) Rolf von Uslar	Germany	October 2024	May 2025
2	Brigadier General (MD) Stefan Kowitz	Germany	August 2019	September 2024
1	Brigadier General (MD) Bruno Most	Germany	April 2018	July 2019

Deputy Director NATO Matters
Nr.	Name	Country	Commencement of post	End of post
2	Colonel (MD) Wynand Korterink	Netherlands	Sep 2025	ongoing
1	Colonel Jürgen Muntenaar	Netherlands	May 2021	Aug 2025

Deputy Director EU Matters
Nr.	Name	Country	Commencement of post	End of post
2	Colonel (MD) David Lacassagne	France	September 2022	ongoing
1	Colonel (MD) Thierry Lanteri	France	September 2020	August 2022

Executive Officer (XO)
Nr.	Name	Country	Commencement of post	End of post
4	Colonel (GS) Andreas Klaus Godau	Germany	19 December 2023	ongoing
3	Colonel (GS) Jochen Thumser	Germany	November 2019	18 December 2023
2	Lieutenant Colonel Alexander Jäckel	Germany	August 2018	October 2019
1	Colonel (MD) Egon Ritter	Germany	April 2018	July 2018

== See also ==
- Permanent Structured Cooperation
- United States Army Medical Command
- Enhanced cooperation
- European Air Transport Command
- Multinational Medical Coordination Centre
- European Medical Corps
- NATO
