= Airborne Electronic Attack =

- Type: Electronic warfare
- Place of origin: European Union

Service history
- Used by: Spanish Army; French Army; Swedish Army

Airborne Electronic Attack (AEA) is a European Union Permanent Structured Cooperation (PESCO) initiative meant to equip future European military aircraft with new electronic-warfare capabilities. The project is led by Spain with the goal of enabling a platform for Airborne Electronic Attack missions that could adapt to the latest electronic warfare requirements, which include suppression of enemy air defences, escort/modified-escort role, non-traditional electronic attack, self-protected/time-critical strike support, and continuous capability enhancement. The system will also protect the GNSS from interference by foreign powers in various ways.

It will follow a modular development approach, with the option of being inside the aircraft or in a pod configuration, in order to be compatible with different aircraft, such as the Eurofighter Typhoon or the Future Combat Air System. It will allow European air forces to safely carry out operations within EU territory and the projection of the force in other potential areas of operations.

== Features ==
Main features:

- Very high ERP, for main, side and scattered lobes jamming
- Solid-state active phased array AESA jamming
- Multiple DRFM architecture for simultaneous beam aimed multi-threat jamming
- Smart digital jamming techniques
- Up to 360° wide angular coverage
- Extended low and high brand threat coverage capabilities

Increased ES/EA mission capability through advanced jamming functions:

- Pod or internally mounted, for fighter aircraft, UAV, J-UCAV or mission aircraft with network centric warfare (NCW) capabilities
- Very high power main / side / scattered lobe jamming
- Unsigned raid DDA, up to RF horizon action possible
- Smart techniques / coherent waveforms / covert jamming
- Smart power management using active phased array transmitter

== Members ==
- Spain - Project Coordinator
- France
- Sweden

== Companies ==
(Spain) Indra

== See also ==
- Common Security and Defence Policy
  - Permanent Structured Cooperation
    - European Main Battle Tank
    - European Patrol Corvette
    - Eurocopter Tiger
  - European External Action Service
