= Military Mobility =

EU project aiding movement of the military

Lead Nation Participant Observer

Military Mobility is one of the initial projects launched under the European Union's (EU) Permanent Structured Cooperation in Defence (PESCO) facility. It is commonly termed a "Military Schengen" as it is inspired by the EU's Schengen Area, but designated to aid the free movement of military units and assets throughout Europe via removal of bureaucratic barriers and improvement of infrastructure.

== Background ==
Last month, [Lieutenant General Ben Hodges] sat in his jet on the tarmac of Papa Air base in Hungary, engines screaming in the 40-degree heat, as an aide collected the passports of the general and his entourage, including a German military attaché and this reporter, and brought them to be checked by Hungarian border guards waiting in a nearby car, so that the entourage could fly on to a base in Bulgaria.

— Politico Europe

The zone was proposed by Commander of United States Army Europe, Lieutenant General Ben Hodges who made some initial headway via NATO, but issues like passport checks and weaknesses in transport links that cannot take large military vehicles persisted. In 2017 Jeanine Hennis-Plasschaert, Dutch defence minister, proposed a Schengen-inspired agreement for movement as part of the PESCO facility gaining ground as a result of Brexit and geopolitical pressures.

Military mobility was selected as a PESCO project due to its low cost and relatively little political disagreement on the subject. Out of all PESCO projects at launch, nearly all PESCO states will participate in it. The agreement is one which is designed to work with both NATO and EU operations, to ensure "units and equipment are in the right place at the right time, regardless of whether they are deployed in an EU or NATO context."

The European Commission followed up with an Action Plan for Military Mobility in 2018. The Action Plan aims to provide a coherent framework for the ongoing and future programmes, projects, initiatives and activities. This will allow for a more coordinated EU approach, strengthening solidarity among Member States and improving the EU's added-value.

== Aim ==
The PESCO Project on Military Mobility is inspired by Schengen, but faces very different challenges. It revolves around two main areas. The first is the removal of bureaucratic barriers such as passport checks and requirement of advance notice. While in the event of an emergency NATO can move troops faster, during peacetime advance notice is required for many movements; for example the movement of US troops from Poland to Germany requires 5 days' advance notice.

The second area is infrastructure, there are roads and bridges that cannot take the weight of heavy equipment, tunnels which are too small and airstrips which cannot accommodate larger aircraft.

On the official PESCO website, the aim of the project is described as follows:

"This project supports Member States’ commitment to simplify and standardize cross-border military transport procedures in line with the Council conclusions of 25th June 2018. It aims to enable the unhindered movement of military personnel and assets within the borders of the EU. This entails avoiding long bureaucratic procedures to move through or over EU Member States, be it via rail, road, air or sea. Issues on which the project is currently focussed are the sharing of best practises, implementing the deliverables of the FAC-Defence Council conclusions of 25th June 2018 and strategic communication."

== Participants ==
Participant Observer Non-EU participant

As of PESCO's launch in December 2017, the Military Mobility project is the only project to count nearly every PESCO state as a participant (only France is absent, initially just observing). The project is led by Germany and the Netherlands. PESCO counts all EU states except Malta.

Since November 2020, third countries have been able to participate in PESCO. Canada, Norway, and the United States applied to participate in the project to improve military mobility in Europe. In May 2021, the EU gave the three countries permission to participate in the Military Mobility project. The United Kingdom applied to join the project in July 2022 with the EU granting permission for the UK to participate in November 2022.

Turkey has also requested to join the project. Austria has nonetheless opposed the Turkish bid, with the Austrian defence minister arguing that Turkey "does not fulfil the admission requirements for third countries". In June 2022, Finland and Sweden signed a trilateral agreement with Turkey during the 2022 Madrid summit that would see the two countries support Turkey's inclusion in Military Mobility as part of a broader agreement that would allow Finland and Sweden to join NATO.

Participants:

- Netherlands - Project coordinator
- Austria
- Belgium
- Bulgaria
- Croatia
- Cyprus
- Czech Republic
- Denmark
- Estonia
- Finland
- France
- Germany
- Greece
- Hungary
- Italy
- Latvia
- Lithuania
- Luxembourg
- Poland
- Portugal
- Romania
- Slovakia
- Slovenia
- Spain
- Sweden

Non-EU participants:

- Canada
- Norway
- United Kingdom
- United States

== National Plans on Military Mobility ==
In the EU Action Plan on Military Mobility, one of the main deliverables for participating nations is to "develop national plans for military mobility, to engage in exercises practising mobility and to establish a network of points of contact by the end of 2019".

As the project coordinator for the PESCO project on Military Mobility, The Netherlands adopted its National Plan on Military Mobility in January 2021, reaffirming The Netherlands' position as the Gateway to/from Europe and its prominent role as a transit nation for Host Nation Support purposes. It is noteworthy to read that in an EU PESCO related National Plan on Military Mobility, two of the strategic goals identified are NATO related: "actively support the Enablement of SACEUR's AOR" & "Uphold NATO commitments"

== See also ==
- Permanent Structured Cooperation
- Common Security and Defence Policy
- Enhanced cooperation
- Schengen Agreement
- NATO: Joint Support and Enabling Command
