= Permanent Structured Cooperation =

European Union defence policy agreement

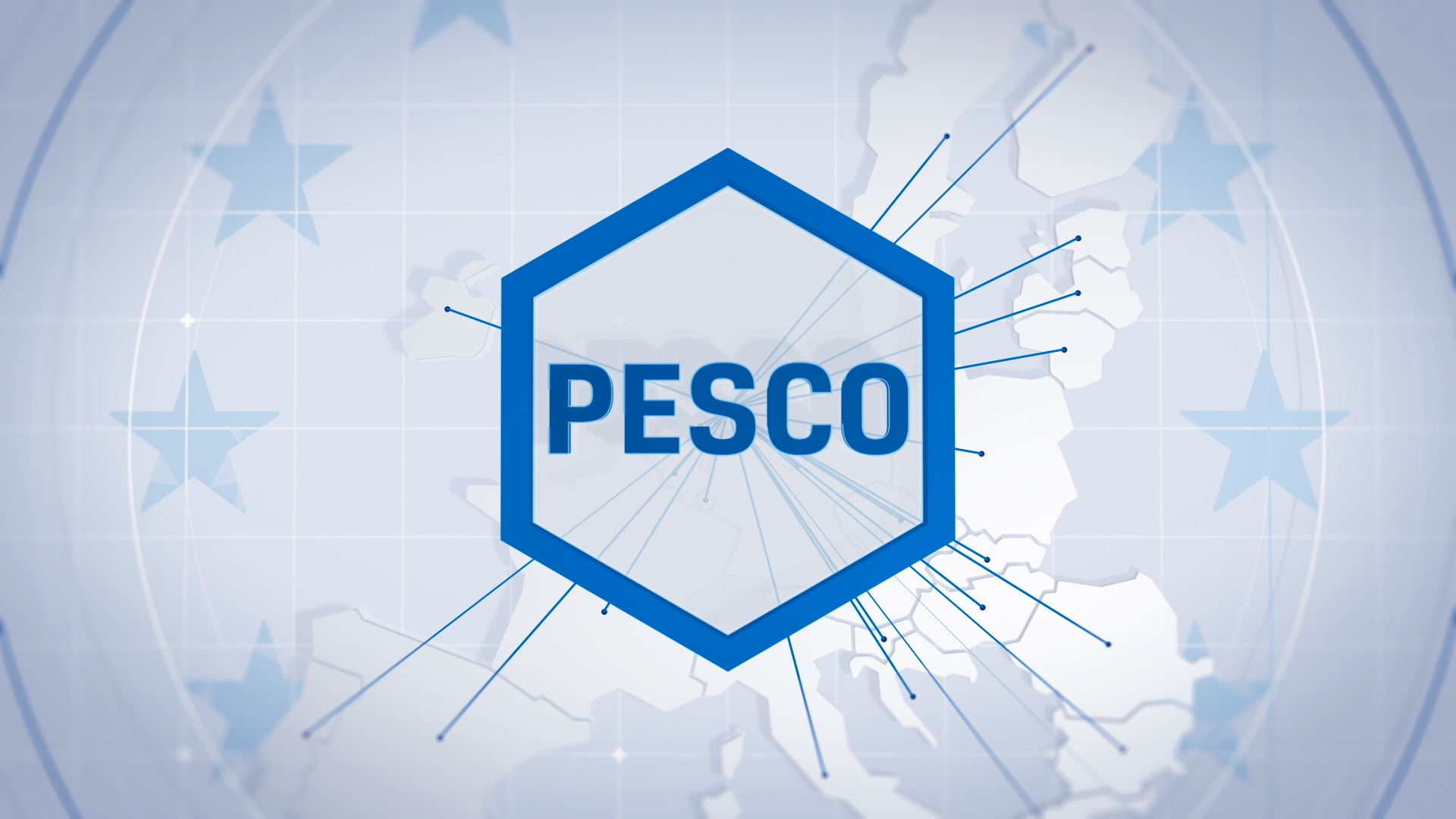

- PESCO States Non-PESCO EU State
- Formation: 2018; 8 years ago
- Type: Framework for structural integration within the Common Security and Defence Policy, based on Article 42(6) of the Treaty on the European Union
- Members: 26 out of 27 European Union member states (with Malta as the only exception)
- Website: pesco.europa.eu

The Permanent Structured Cooperation (PESCO) is the part of the European Union (EU) security and defence policy (CSDP) in which 26 of the 27 national armed forces pursue structural integration (the exception being Malta). Based on Article 42(6) and Protocol 10 of the Treaty on the European Union, introduced by the Treaty of Lisbon in 2009, PESCO was initiated in 2017. The integration into PESCO is through projects which launched in 2018.

Together with the Coordinated Annual Review on Defence (CARD), the European Defence Fund and the Military Planning and Conduct Capability (MPCC) it forms a comprehensive defence package for the EU.

PESCO is similar to enhanced co-operation in other policy areas, in the sense that integration does not require participation of all EU member states.

== History ==
=== Pre-activation ===
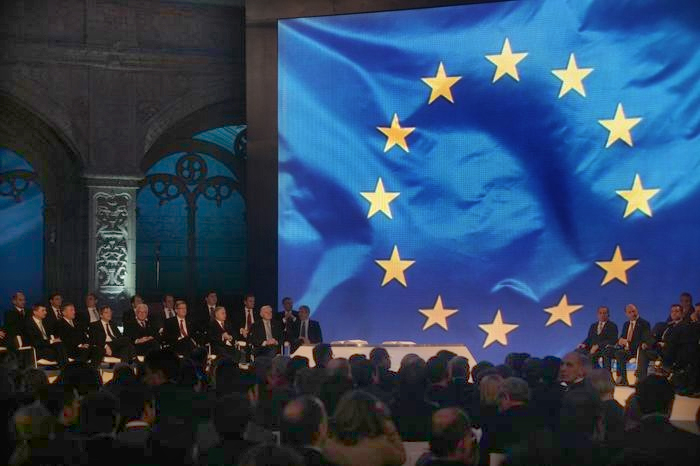
In 2009 the Treaty of Lisbon (signing depicted) entered into force, enabling permanent structured cooperation in defence between a subset of willing member states.

PESCO was first written into the European Constitution under Article III-312, which failed ratification, and then into the Treaty of Lisbon of 2009. It added the possibility for those members whose military capabilities fulfil higher criteria and which have made more binding commitments to one another in this area with a view to the most demanding missions shall establish permanent structured cooperation (PESCO) within the EU framework. PESCO was seen as the way to enable the common defence foreseen in Article 42, but the scepticism towards further integration that had arisen around the rejection of the European Constitution meant its activation was unlikely. It was termed, by President Jean-Claude Juncker, the Lisbon Treaty's "sleeping beauty".

In the 2010s, the geopolitical landscape around the EU began to change, triggering a series of crises. The Libyan Civil War, the Syrian Civil War and the rise of the Islamic State of Iraq and the Levant caused the European migrant crisis. Russia invaded Ukraine in 2014, annexing Crimea and triggering an ongoing conflict in the country over the Ukraine–European Union Association Agreement. In 2016, Donald Trump, who was elected as President of the United States, was critical of NATO allies, even refusing on several occasions to back the mutual defence clause; and the United Kingdom, one of the EU's two largest military powers, voted in a referendum to withdraw from the EU.

This new environment, while very different from the one PESCO was designed for, gave new impetus to European defence cooperation. The withdrawal of the UK, historically an opponent of that cooperation, gave further hope of success. At a rally in Bavaria, Angela Merkel argued that: “The times in which we could completely depend on others are, to a certain extent, over ... I’ve experienced that in the last few days. We Europeans truly have to take our fate into our own hands.” In late 2016, the EU put defence co-operation on its post-Brexit Bratislava and Rome declarations.

There was some disagreement between France and Germany about the nature of PESCO. France foresaw a small but ambitious group with serious capabilities making major practical leaps forward; while Germany, weary of further divisions in the EU, wanted a more inclusive approach that could potentially include all states, regardless of their military capability or willingness to integrate. Further, for Germany, it was about building capabilities and giving a post-Brexit signal of unity, whereas France was focused on operations and looking for help for its overstretched African deployments. Their compromise was to re-imagine PESCO as a process. PESCO would be inclusive, but not all states had to take part in all projects and progress would be phased allowing the development of new, common capabilities without having to resolve larger differences on end-goals first. Further, states would not need to already have capabilities, but merely pledge to work towards them. This allowed France's idea of improving military capabilities without shutting out states who did not already attain the threshold.

=== Activation ===
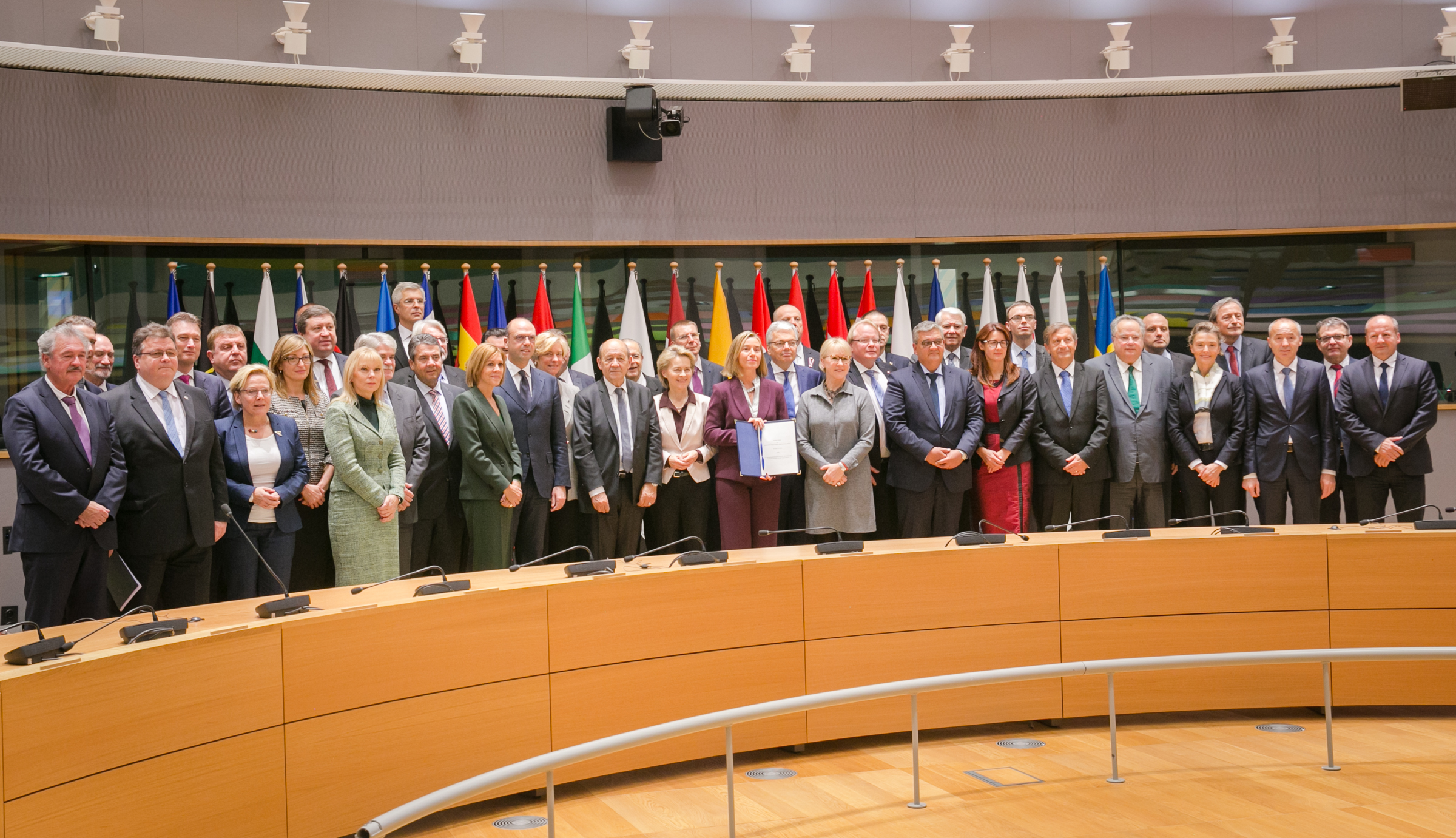
On 13 November 2017, Foreign and Defence Ministers from 23 EU states signed the Joint notification on setting up PESCO in a Foreign Affairs Council chaired by the High Representative for Foreign Affairs, Federica Mogherini.

On 7 September 2017, an agreement was made between EU foreign affairs ministers to move forward with PESCO with 10 initial projects. The agreement was signed on 13 November by 23 of the 28 member states. Ireland and Portugal notified the High Representative and the Council of the European Union of their desire to join PESCO on 7 December 2017 and PESCO was activated by the 25 states on 11 December 2017 with the approval of a Council Decision. Denmark did not participate as (prior to its abolition in July 2022) it had an opt-out from the Common Security and Defence Policy, nor did the United Kingdom, which withdrew from the EU in 2020. Malta opted out as well, due to concerns it might conflict with its neutrality. As per Article 46 of the TEU, non-participating EU member states can request to join by notifying the Council, which will approve based on a qualified majority of participating member states.

== Principles ==
Those Member States whose military capabilities fulfil higher criteria and which have made more binding commitments to one another in this area with a view to the most demanding missions shall establish permanent structured cooperation within the Union framework. Such cooperation shall be governed by Article 46. It shall not affect the provisions of Article 43.

— Article 42.6 of Treaty on European Union

Those states shall notify their intention to the Council and to the High Representative. The Council then adopts, by qualified majority a decision establishing PESCO and determining the list of participating Member States. Any other member state that fulfills the criteria and wishes to participate can join the PESCO following the same procedure, but in the voting for the decision only the states already part of the PESCO will participate. If a participating state no longer fulfills the criteria a decision suspending its participation is taken by the same procedure as for accepting new participants, but excluding the concerned state from the voting procedure. If a participating state wishes to withdraw from PESCO it just notifies the Council to remove it from the list of participants. All other decisions and recommendations of the Council concerning PESCO issues unrelated to the list of participants require a unanimous vote of the participating states.

The criteria established in the PESCO Protocol are the following:

- co-operate and harmonise requirements and pool resources in the fields related to defence equipment acquisition, research, funding and utilisation, notably the programmes and initiatives of the European Defence Agency (e.g. Code of Conduct on Defence Procurement)
- capacity to supply, either at national level or as a component of multinational force groups, targeted combat units for the missions planned, structured at a tactical level as a battle group, with support elements including transport (airlift, sealift) and logistics, within a period of five to 30 days, in particular in response to requests from the United Nations, and which can be sustained for an initial period of 30 days and be extended up to at least 120 days.
- capable of carrying out in the above timeframes the tasks of joint disarmament operations, humanitarian and rescue tasks, military advice and assistance tasks, conflict prevention and peace-keeping tasks, tasks of combat forces in crisis management, including peace-making and post-conflict stabilisation

== Participating armed forces ==
The following member states have announced their intention of participating in PESCO:

- Austria
- Belgium
- Bulgaria
- Croatia
- Cyprus
- (Czech Republic) Czechia
- Denmark
- Estonia
- Finland
- France
- Germany
- Greece
- Hungary
- (Republic of Ireland) Ireland
- Italy
- Latvia
- Lithuania
- Luxembourg
- Netherlands
- Poland
- Portugal
- Romania
- Slovakia
- Slovenia
- Spain
- Sweden

As per Article 46 of the TEU, the following non-participating EU member states can request to join by notifying the Council, which will approve based on a qualified majority of participating member states:

- Malta, which wants to see how PESCO develops first since it may violate the Maltese Constitution (Neutrality Clause).

=== Denmark ===
Denmark originally had an opt-out from participating in the common defence policy. However, following the Russian invasion of Ukraine in February 2022, the Danish parliament adopted a proposal in favour of the country participating in the Common Security and Defence Policy, including the European Defence Agency and PESCO, on 8 April 2022. Danish voters approved ending the opt-out in a 1 June 2022 referendum, which became effective 1 July. Subsequently the country proceeded to consider participating in PESCO, which was approved by Parliament in March 2023. The Council of the EU approved Denmark joining PESCO on 23 May 2023.

=== Non-EU participants ===
Since November 2020, third countries can also participate in PESCO.

==== Canada, Norway and the United States ====
Canada, Norway, and the United States participate in the project to improve military mobility in Europe.

==== Turkey ====
In May 2021, Turkey applied to participate in the military mobility project, but this was opposed by Austria in addition to the existing tensions with Greece and Cyprus. In June 2022, Finland and Sweden committed to "support the fullest possible involvement of Turkey and other non-EU Allies in the existing and prospective initiatives of the European Union's Common Security and Defence Policy, including Turkey's participation in the PESCO Project on Military Mobility" in a trilateral memorandum agreed to at the 2022 Madrid summit to facilitate Turkey's ratification of Finland and Sweden's NATO membership application.

==== United Kingdom ====
On 6 October 2022, at the 1st European Political Community Summit, British Prime Minister Liz Truss committed the United Kingdom to joining PESCO and its military mobility project. On 15 November 2022, the Council of the EU invited the UK to participate in the Military Mobility project.

==== Switzerland ====
In 2025, Council of the EU invited Switzerland to join the military mobility project. An opinion poll conducted two months after the 2022 Russian invasion of Ukraine showed support for the country joining PESCO.

=== Neutral states ===
PESCO includes two of the three EU states that describe themselves as neutral (Austria and Ireland), and is designed to be as inclusive as possible by allowing states to opt in or out as their unique foreign policies allow. Some members of the Irish Parliament considered Ireland joining PESCO as an abandonment of neutrality. The measure was passed, with the government arguing that its opt-in nature allowed Ireland to "join elements of PESCO that were beneficial such as counter-terrorism, cyber security and peace keeping ... what we are not going to be doing is buying aircraft carriers and fighter jets." While critics of Ireland's participation point to the commitment to increase defence spending, the government has made clear that the 2% commitment is collective, and not for each state individually. The Irish government has made clear that any defence spending increase by Ireland would be minor. Malta, the only neutral state not to participate, argued that it was going to wait and see how PESCO develops, in order to see whether it would compromise Maltese neutrality.

=== NATO ===
While PESCO was formed in part due to doubts over the United States' commitment to NATO, officials stress that PESCO will be complementary to NATO security rather than in competition with it. NATO Secretary General Jens Stoltenberg also highlighted how Military Mobility is a key example of NATO and EU co-operation.

==== Criticism and lobbying by the United States ====
The United States has voiced concerns and published 'warnings' about PESCO several times, which many analysts believe to be a sign that the United States fears a loss of influence in Europe, as a militarily self-sufficient EU would make NATO increasingly irrelevant. Alongside better military cooperation, PESCO also seeks to enhance the defence industry of member states and create jobs within the EU, which several US politicians have criticised over fears of losing revenue from EU states (on average, the United States sells over €1 billion in weapons to EU countries per year). According to Françoise Grossetête, a member of the European Parliament from 1994 to 2019, the US is lobbying strongly against increased military cooperation between EU member states, going as far as to directly invite MEPs to 'private dinners' to try to convince them to vote against any directives or laws that would seek to strengthen military cooperation within the EU.

Despite opposition to PESCO, the United States expressed its desire to participate in the Military Mobility project in 2021. European analysts have suggested that this might pose an attempt to undermine an independent European defence policy from within.

In 2025, Hungary has expressed skepticism toward PESCO initiatives, favoring bilateral defense procurements and national industrial development. The Hungarian government's 2025 strategy emphasized maintaining autonomous defense capabilities through programs such as Zrínyi 2026, which aims to reduce reliance on supranational EU military structures.

== Governance ==
The European Defence Agency and European External Action Service act as PESCO's secretariat. The projects are incentivised by the European Commission’s European Defence Fund. There is a two-layer governance structure:

Council level
Responsible for the overall policy direction and decision-making including as regards the assessment mechanism to determine if Member States are fulfilling their commitments. Only PESCO members are voting, decisions are taken by unanimity (except decisions regarding the suspension of membership and entry of new members which are taken by qualified majority).
Projects level
Each project will be managed by those member states that contribute to it, in line with general rules for project management to be developed at overarching level.

== List of projects ==
The first PESCO projects started with a list of 50 ideas and was whittled down to provide a short list of small-scale projects. Major armament projects are intended in the future (EU forces use 178 different weapon systems compared to 30 in the US), but initially PESCO is to be focused on smaller operations to lay groundwork.

PESCO projects as of February, 2021 and participating countries by category:

=== Air - Systems ===
Project name	Abbr	Coordinator	Project members	Project observer
European MALE RPAS	EURODRONE	Germany	Czech Republic; Germany; Spain; France; Italy	
European attack helicopter TIGER MARK III		France	Germany; Spain; France	
Counter Unmanned Aerial System	C-UAS	Italy	Czech Republic; Italy	
Airborne Electronic Attack	AEA	Spain	Spain; France; Sweden	
Integrated Multi-layer Air and Missile Defense System	IMLAMD	Italy	Italy; France; Hungary; Sweden	
Future Short-Range air-to-air Missile	FSRM	Germany	Germany; Spain; Italy; Hungary; Sweden	
Next Generation Medium Helicopter	NGMH	France	France; Spain; Italy; Finland	

=== Cyber - C4ISR ===
Project name	Abbr.	Coordinator	Project members	Project observer
European Secure Software-defined Radio	ESSOR	France	Belgium; Germany; Spain; Netherlands; Finland; France; Italy; Poland; Portugal	
Cyber Threats and Incident Response Information Sharing Platform	CTIRISP	Greece	Cyprus; Greece; Spain; Hungary; Italy; Portugal	
Cyber Rapid Response Teams	CRRT	Lithuania	Estonia; Croatia; Lithuania; Netherlands; Poland; Romania	
The Strategic Command and Control System for CSDP Missions	ESC2	Spain	Germany; Spain; Netherlands; France; Italy; Portugal	
European High Atmosphere Airship Platform - ISR Capability	EHAAP	Italy	France; Italy	
SOCC for Small Joint Operations with Special Operations Forces Tactical Command and Control capabilities	SOCC FOR SJO	Greece	Cyprus; Greece	
Electronic Warfare Capability/Interoperability Programmer for future ISR	JISR	Czech Republic	Czech Republic; Germany	
Cyber and Information Domain Coordination Center	CIDCC	Germany	France; Germany; Hungary; Netherlands	Austria; Czech Republic; Estonia; Greece; Italy; Poland; Portugal; Spain; Slovak Republic

=== Enabling - Joint ===
Project name	Abbr.	Coordinator	Project members	Project observer
European Medical Command	EMC	Germany	Belgium; Czech Republic; Germany; Spain; France; Italy; Netherlands; Hungary; Luxembourg; Poland; Romania; Slovakia; Sweden	
Network of Logistic Hubs in Europe and support to operations	NetLogHubs	Germany	Belgium; Bulgaria; Croatia; Cyprus; Germany; Greece; France; Italy; Netherlands; Hungary; Poland; Lithuania; Slovakia; Slovenia	
Military Mobility	MM	Netherlands	Austria; Belgium; Bulgaria; Croatia; Cyprus; Czech Republic; Denmark; Estonia; Finland; Germany; Greece; France; Italy; Netherlands; Luxembourg; Latvia; Hungary; Poland; Portugal; Lithuania; Romania; Slovakia; Slovenia; Sweden; Spain	
Energy Operation Function	EOF	France	Belgium; Spain; France; Italy	
Chemical, Biological, Radiological and Nuclear Surveillance as a Service	CBRN SaaS	Austria	Austria; Croatia; France; Italy; Slovenia	
Geo-Meteorological and Oceanographic Support Coordination Element	GEOMETOC GMSCE	Germany	Austria; Germany; Greece; France; Portugal; Romania	
Timely Warning and Interception with Space-based Theater Surveillance	TWISTER	France	Finland; Germany; Italy; France; Netherlands; Spain	
Materials and Components for Technological EU Competitiveness	MAC-EU	France	Germany; Portugal; France; Romania; Spain	
EU Collaborative Warfare Capabilities	ECOWAR	France	Belgium; France; Hungary; Poland; Romania; Spain; Sweden	
European Global RPAS Insertion Architecture System	GLORIA	Italy	France; Italy; Romania	
Robust Communication Infrastructure and Networks	ROCOMIN	Sweden	Sweden; France	
Arctic Command & Control Effector And Sensor System	ACCESS	Finland	Finland; Estonia; France; Sweden	
Counter Battery Sensors	COBAS	France	Netherlands	
Role 2F		Spain	Spain; Bulgaria; France; Portugal; Finland; Sweden	

=== Land - Formations - Systems ===
Project name	Abbr.	Coordinator	Project members	Project observer
Deployable Military Disaster Relief Capability Package	DM-DRCP	Italy	Greece; Spain; Croatia; Austria; Italy	
Armoured Infantry Fighting Vehicle / Amphibious Assault Vehicle / Light Armoured Vehicle	AIFV/AAV/LAV	Italy	Greece; Slovakia; Italy	
Crisis Response Operation Core	EUFOR CROC	Germany	Cyprus; France; Germany; Greece; Italy; Spain	
Integrated Unmanned Ground System	UGS	Estonia	Belgium; Czech Republic; Estonia; France; Finland; Germany; Hungary; Latvia; Netherlands; Poland; Spain	
Integrated Unmanned Ground Systems 2	IUGS2	Estonia	Estonia; Germany; France; Italy; Latvia; Hungary; Netherlands; Finland; Sweden	
EU Beyond Line of Sight Land Battlefield Missile Systems	EU BLOS	France	Belgium; Cyprus; France	
European Defense Airlift Training Academy	EDA-TA	France	France; Spain; Italy; Hungary; Portugal	

=== Maritime ===
Project name	Abbr.	Coordinator	Project member	Project observer
Maritime Semi-Autonomous Systems for Mine Countermeasures	MAS MCM	Belgium	Belgium; Greece; Latvia; Netherlands; Poland; Portugal; Romania	
Harbour & Maritime Surveillance and Protection	HARMSPRO	Italy	Greece; Italy; Poland; Portugal	
Upgrade of Maritime Surveillance	UMS	Greece	Greece; Croatia; Cyprus; Bulgaria; France; Italy; Spain; Ireland	
Deployable Modular Underwater Intervention Capability Package	DIVEPACK	Bulgaria	Bulgaria; Greece; France; Romania	
Maritime Unmanned Anti-Submarine System	MUSAS	Portugal	France; Portugal; Spain; Sweden	
European Patrol Corvette	EPC	Italy	Denmark; France; Greece; Norway; Spain; Italy; Romania	Croatia; Portugal
Anti-torpedo torpedo	ATT	Germany	Germany; Netherlands	
Critical Seabed Infrastructure Protection	CSIP	Italy	Italy; Germany; Spain; France; Portugal; Sweden	

=== Space ===
Project name	Abbr.	Coordinator	Project members	Project observer
EU Radio Navigation Solution	EURAS	France	Belgium; France; Germany; Spain; Italy; Poland	
European Military Space Surveillance Awareness Network	EU-SSA-N	Italy	France; Greece; Netherlands; Italy	

=== Training - Facilities ===
Project name	Abbr.	Coordinator	Project members	Project observer
European Training Certification Centre for European Armies	ETCCEA	Italy	Greece; Italy	
Helicopter Hot and High Training	H3 TRAINING	Greece	Greece; Italy; Romania	
Joint EU Intelligence School	JEIS	Greece	Greece; Cyprus	
Integrated European Joint Training and Simulation Centre	EUROSIM	Hungary	France; Germany; Hungary; Poland; Slovenia	
EU Cyber Academia and Innovation Hub	EU CAIH	Portugal	Portugal; Spain	
Special Operations Forces Medical Training Centre	SMTC	Poland	Hungary; Poland	
CBRN Defence Training Range	CBRNDTR	Romania	France; Italy; Romania	
EU Network of Diving Centres	EUNDC	Romania	Bulgaria; France; Romania	

=== Potential ===
Potential future PESCO projects include the following existing intergovernmental cooperations between member states' militaries, presently outside the CSDP framework:

Forces and command centres:

- Eurocorps
- European Gendarmerie Force
- European Air Transport Command
- European Maritime Force
- Movement Coordination Centre Europe

Bodies fostering integration:

- European Air Group
- Finabel
- Organisation for Joint Armament Cooperation
- European Personnel Recovery Centre

== See also ==
- Enhanced cooperation
- European Intervention Initiative

Other initiatives of the Common Security and Defence Policy established after the introduction of the European Union Global Strategy

- Coordinated Annual Review on Defence (CARD)
- European Defence Fund
- EUGS, European Union Global Strategy

Other 'European' defence organisations that are currently not part of the CSDP but could potentially become PESCO projects

- Movement Coordination Centre Europe
- European Air Group
- Finabel
- European Organisation of Military Associations
- Organisation for Joint Armament Cooperation
- European Personnel Recovery Centre
- European Air Transport Command
