= European Air Group =

International military organization in Europe

- Abbreviation: EAG
- Formation: 6 July 1998
- Type: International organization
- Headquarters: RAF High Wycombe, United Kingdom
- Members: Belgium; Germany; France; Netherlands; Italy; Spain; United Kingdom
- Director: Lieutenant General Ingo Gerhartz (German Air Force)
- Website: euroairgroup.org

The European Air Group (EAG) is an independent defence organisation, formed by the Air Forces of its seven member states: Belgium, France, Germany, Italy, Netherlands, Spain and the United Kingdom. The EAG is focused on improving interoperability among the air forces of EAG and partner states.

Franco-British European Air Group (FBEAG) in 1995. Joined the European Air Group (EAG) between 2000 and 2004. Partners.

The participation in European defence organisations

== History ==
The origins of the EAG extend back to the 1991 Gulf War, during which the United Kingdom's Royal Air Force (RAF) and France's Armée de l’Air (French Air Force or FAF) worked closely together on a range of operations. Subsequently, the two Air Forces collaborated again, this time on missions in support of United Nations forces in the former Yugoslavia and in operations over Bosnia-Herzegovina.

As a result of these experiences, both France and the UK realised that to improve their level of interoperability, a new organization was needed that would provide focus and momentum. Consequently, the intention to form the Franco-British European Air Group (FBEAG) was announced at the Chartres Summit in 1994 and the FBEAG was formally inaugurated at a joint ceremony involving French President Jacques Chirac and British Prime Minister John Major the following year. From the start, the word ‘European’ was included in the organisation's title, to enable other potential members to join the initiative.

As the FBEAG evolved, it was decided that other states would be invited to become ‘correspondent’ members, which became the catalyst for a more permanent arrangement. Italy became the first new state to apply for membership, soon to be followed by others, and on 1 January 1998, the name of the FBEAG was changed to ‘the European Air Group’ (EAG). Shortly afterwards, the new Headquarters Building was formally opened at RAF High Wycombe in June 1998 by the UK Secretary of State for Defence, the Right Honourable George Robertson MP, who the following year became the Secretary General of NATO.

The new EAG was formally endorsed by the Ministers of France and the UK, Alain Richard and George Robertson, who jointly signed the Inter-Governmental Agreement on 6 July 1998. This date marks the formal start point of the EAG, which rapidly expanded under an Amending Protocol signed on 16 June 1999 to allow the accession of new members and reach its current composition of seven member states: Belgium, France, Germany, Italy, Netherlands, Spain and the United Kingdom.

== Organisation ==
The EAG is governed by the EAG Steering Group (SG), composed of the Chiefs of the Air Staff from each of the seven nations. They convene once a year to provide high-level direction and guidance on all matters relating to the EAG.

A permanent staff of 30 personnel – 24 officers and 6 non-commissioned officers – is established at RAF High Wycombe, United Kingdom. They are responsible for the execution and coordination of EAG activities in pursuit of the organisation's objectives.

The EAG is headed by the Director EAG (DEAG), the Chief of the Air Staff of one of the EAG members. As he normally resides in his national headquarters, the EAG PS operates under the direction and guidance of the Deputy Director EAG (DDEAG), a "one star" Air-Officer who is appointed as the senior permanent post on the EAG PS at High Wycombe.

The EAG PS is managed by the Chief of Staff (COS) EAG, who supports the DDEAG by translating policies, directives and initiatives into detailed EAG staff projects, tasks and activities.

== Members ==
- France (1995)
- United Kingdom (1995)
- Italy (2000)
- Netherlands (2001)
- Germany (2001)
- Spain (2002)
- Belgium (2004)

== Partner states ==
- Norway
- Sweden

== Associate states ==
- Canada
- Poland
- United States
- Australia

== See also ==
- European Air Transport Command
- European Personnel Recovery Centre
