= European Defence Fund =

European Union security and defense fund

European Defense Fund
- Created: 28 April 2021 (Note: As second iteration since 2017)
- Commissioned by: European Parliament; Council of the EU
- Subject: Establishment of European Defence Fund, repealing Regulation (EU) 2018/1092
- Purpose: Financing instrument

Official website
EDF: Developing tomorrow's defence capabilities
- Funding agency: EU member budgets
- Sponsors: Non-EU members (voluntary contributions)
- Framework programme: EU Research and Development in defence support
- Reference: PE/11/2021/INIT OJ L 170, 12.5.2021, pp.149 – 177) (Note: Initial text, current EUR-Lex version in effect)
- Location: Europe
- Project coordinator: Directorate-General for Defence Industry and Space
- Participants: European SMEs
- Budget: Total: €7,300 million period of 2021– 2027; Funding: (see §)
- Duration: 2017 fiscal year – present

The European Defence Fund (EDF) is a component of the European Union's (EU) Common Security and Defence Policy (CSDP) which aims to coordinate and increase national investment in defence research and improve interoperability between national armed forces. It was proposed in 2016 by Commission President Jean-Claude Juncker and established in 2017.

The fund has two stands: Research (€90 million until the end of 2019 and €500 million per year after 2020) and Development & Acquisition (€500 million in total for 2019–20 then €1 billion per year after 2020). In July 2018, the European Commission announced that the EDF budget for 2021–27 would be €13 billion. This sum was later revised by the European Commission as part of the new EU budget proposed on May 27, 2020, as a result of the COVID-19 pandemic, according to which the EDF will be allocated €8 billion over this budget period.

== Aim ==
The European Commission co-finances joint defence industrial projects and supports collaborative defense research across the EU. Specifically, the Juncker Commission has planned and made an unprecedented effort to protect and defend Europeans. The plan is that from 2021, a fully-fledged European Defence Fund will foster an innovative and competitive defense industrial base and contribute to the EU's strategic autonomy. Strategic autonomy is the ability of the European Union to defend Europe and act militarily in its neighborhood without so much reliance on the United States. The goal of strategic autonomy is however not to act alone militarily, and the European Union can be characterized as non-interventionist in nature. The European Defence Fund, together with the Coordinated Annual Review on Defence and Permanent Structured Cooperation forms a new comprehensive defence package for the EU.

== Synopsis ==
The EDF is a programme provided for by the European Commission which aims to provide funding for collaborative defence projects at various stages of development of small and medium enterprises (SMEs). Within the scope of the 2021-2027 EU budget, a total of EUR 8 billion are allocated to the EDF, including EUR 5.3 billion to fund collaborative capability developing projects, and EUR 2.7 billion to fund collaborative defence research on future threats. The EDF adapts its funding to each individual project depending on its stage of development, and EU Member State involvement: Up to 100% of research can be funded, while up to 80% development can be funded.

The EDF is an evolution of prior EU defence industry support initiatives: Preparatory Action on Defence Research (PADR), which provided EUR 90 million to fund defence projects over the course of 2017-2019, and the European Defence Industrial Development Programme (EDIDP) which allocated EUR 500 million of funding to a total of 42 projects, which were selected over two years.

The EDF is implemented through an annual work programme structured along 17 thematic and horizontal categories of actions which will remain stable during the Multiannual Financial Framework 2021-2027. The annual work programmes will lead to calls for proposals for collaborative research or development projects.

In order to ease administrative barriers to international collaboration on EDF sponsored projects and counteract the fragmentation of the European defence industry, the European Commission has also drafted the Directive 2009/43/EC (the Defence Transfers Directive or the Transfers Directive) which aims to simplify the rules for transfers of defence equipment between European Member States to ensure the proper functioning of the internal market and simplify otherwise restrictive requirements for the industry, especially for SMEs.

A subset of the EDF is the EU Defence Innovation Scheme (EUDIS), which aims to lower entry barriers into the defence market for SME solutions with potential defence applications through showcase challenges, including pan-European thematic hackathons and other challenges organised by the European Commission to award prizes and scout prospective “unicorn” SMEs and also serves as a business accelerator through multiple funding and empowerment schemes.

== Eligible projects ==
=== Development of equipment and technology ===
Through two precursors to the Fund, the Commission took further steps to make defense cooperation a reality. In 2019 the Commission kick-started the first EU-funded joint defense related industrial projects through the European Defense Industrial Development Program. The first program agreed with the Member States provided €500 million in co-financing for the joint development of defense capabilities during 2019–2020. These cover priority areas in all domains such as air, land, sea, cyber and space:

- Protection and mobility of forces: to help develop CBRN threat detections capabilities or counter drone systems.
- Intelligence, secured communication & Cyber: situational awareness and defence, space situational awareness and early warning capabilities, or maritime surveillance capabilities.
- Operations: to upgrade or development of the next generation of ground-based precision strike capabilities, ground combat capabilities, air combat capabilities and future naval systems.
- Innovation & SMEs: to support solutions in Artificial Intelligence, Virtual Reality and Cyber technologies, as well as to support SMEs.
- Eurodrone: for a crucial capability for Europe's strategic autonomy.
- ESSOR to support interoperable and secure military communications.

=== Research ===
The 2019 Work Programme also dedicated €25 million for research in Electromagnetic Full-spectrum dominance and Future Disruptive Defence Technologies. These two areas have been identified as essential to maintain Europe's long-term lead and independence. The calls on Future Disruptive Defence Technologies will look at how best the EU can support disruptive technologies in defence that may lead to transformational changes in the military. This will help prepare the ground for the European Defence Fund which could allocate up to 8% of its budget for disruptive technologies. In June 2018, the Commission proposed to allocate €13 billion to the fund for the period 2021–2027. The aim is to support collaborative defence projects throughout the entire cycle of Research and development. The Council of the European Union and the European Parliament are to adopt the proposal by 2019.

== See also ==
- Organisation for Joint Armament Cooperation
- European Defence Agency
- European Research Council
- Western European Armaments Group
- Western European Armaments Organisation
- NATO Support and Procurement Agency
- NATO Standardization Office
