= European Air Transport Command =

Coordinates: 51°27′00″N 005°22′28″E

- EATC insignia
- Active: since 1 July 2010 (predecessor founded September 2001)
- Country: Belgium; France; Germany; Italy; Luxembourg; Netherlands; Spain
- Allegiance: European Union (made available to the Common Security and Defence Policy in accordance with TEU, Article 42.3)
- Type: Military Air Transport
- Role: multinational command center
- Size: 160–200
- Garrison/HQ: Eindhoven Airbase
- Mottos: Integrated, Innovative, Effective
- Engagements: 2011 military intervention in Libya; 2012 intervention in Mali
- Website: eatc-mil.com

Commanders
- Current commander: Major General Franck Mollard (France)

The European Air Transport Command (EATC) is the command centre that exercises the operational control of the majority of the aerial refueling capabilities and military transport fleets of a consortium of seven European Union (EU) member states. As of January 2015, the combined fleet under the authority of the EATC represents 75% of the European air transport capacity. Located at Eindhoven Airbase in the Netherlands, the command also bears a limited responsibility for exercises, aircrew training and the harmonisation of relevant national air transport regulations.

The command was established in 2010 with a view to provide a more efficient management of the participating nations' assets and resources in this field.

The EATC is presently not established at the EU level (referred to as the Common Security and Defence Policy, CSDP); it is for instance not a project of the Permanent Structured Cooperation (PESCO) of the CSDP. The EATC and its assets may however contribute in the implementation of the CSDP, when made available as a multinational force in accordance with article 42.3 of the Treaty on European Union (TEU).

== History ==
=== Franco-German initiative ===
In 1999 France and Germany started a politico-military initiative to "prepare the establishment of a European Air Transport Command". The conclusions from the meeting of the European Council in Helsinki the same year, mentions the expressed will of the Union's member states to develop collective goals for rapid capability, including in the area of strategic transport. This was to be achieved voluntarily, to better co-ordinate national and international efforts for the carrying-out of the full range of so-called Petersberg tasks.

A study conducted by the European Air Group (EAG) in 2000 came to the conclusion, that it would be beneficial to co-ordinate the international military airlift requirements and the means to meet them between the EAG nations to exploit all possible synergies. It finally recommended to establish a permanent co-ordination element managing the airlift co-ordination needs of nations in an evolutionary approach by smoothly transferring competencies from existing national structures. This multinational management structure should be developed step by step from purely co-ordination to a combined entity with full command authority.

=== Airlift Coordination Cell ===
The member states of the EAG decided in June 2001 to establish the European Airlift Coordination Cell (EACC) as a first step on this way with the objective to improve the efficiency by identifying spare military airlift capacities and sharing this information with interested nations as offer for additional opportunities. The idea was to improve the utilisation of European military air transport and aerial refueling capabilities and hereby gaining synergetic effects. This entity proved its success as the savings exceeded the operating costs of this cell in the first year.

==== Airlift Centre ====
Consequently, as a next step EACC member Nations decided in June 2003 to further develop this cell by increasing the mission scope and responsibility. The European Airlift Centre (EAC) was established, which indeed on paper received an increased responsibility over the planning of air transport requests and additionally in the field of harmonisation of air transport related regulations. However the political will to transfer adequate levels of authority towards the EAC to fulfil these additional tasks was not strong enough. Therefore, France and Germany agreed on the next step expressing their aspiration for the creation of a multinational air transport command.

On the seventh Franco-German Ministerial Council on 12 October 2006 it was decided to create a common strategic command for airlifts. Other member states of the EAC (Belgium, Spain, the United Kingdom, Italy, the Netherlands and Norway) were invited to join. Belgium and Netherlands did so by signing a note of accession. In May 2007 the chiefs of defence staffs of the four participating nations approved the EATC concept which set the framework for the working process as well as the defined levels of responsibilities and gave the stimulus for further negotiations for the implementation of this new headquarter. An international implementation team based in Beauvechain (Belgium) facilitated the final decision to locate the command in Eindhoven, as well as in getting the Technical Arrangement as the interim legal framework signed by the nations in summer 2010.

=== Establishment ===
The European Air Transport command was officially established on 1 July 2010. On 1 September 2010 the inauguration took place at Eindhoven, in the presence of political and military leaders of the four participating nations; France, Germany, the Netherlands and Belgium. 22 November 2012, Luxembourg acceded to the EATC, and in July 2014 Spain followed suit. Italy formalised in December 2014 to join EATC with 37 aircraft per January 2015 raising the EATC managed fleet to approx. 220 aircraft.

On 1 September 2010 the EATC took over the operational control of most of the participating nation's military cargo aircraft (excluding helicopters) of which the existing fleet of Transall C-160 and Lockheed C-130 Hercules form the largest part. In the future all Airbus A400M shall be put under the command of the EATC (beginning with the official delivery to the nations). A strong motivation for the establishment of the EATC was the limited availability of assets and the operational necessity to co-operate very closely. The A400M is considerably delayed while the inclusion of European troops in combat missions has increased over the years including many overseas missions.

Germany reorganises its Lufttransportkommando (LTKdo) in Münster – the aircraft personnel will be assigned back to the Luftwaffendivision air combat groups and the LTKdo command center itself will retire on 31 December 2010. The EATC takes over authority on 15 October 2010 after being implemented on 1 September 2010. 65 members of the LTKdo have been moved to Eindhoven and Major General Jochen Both takes over the command of the EATC coordination center which has a total staff of 200 members. The command is supposed to switch to a French air force general after two years.

== Participating nations ==
Location of air bases directed by the European Air Transport Command as of September 2017
- Belgium
- France
- Germany
- Italy (2016)
- Luxembourg (2012)
- Netherlands
- Spain (2015)

The following countries have signalled their interest in joining the EATC:

- Austria
- Denmark
- Finland
- Norway
- Poland
- Portugal
- Sweden

== Structure ==
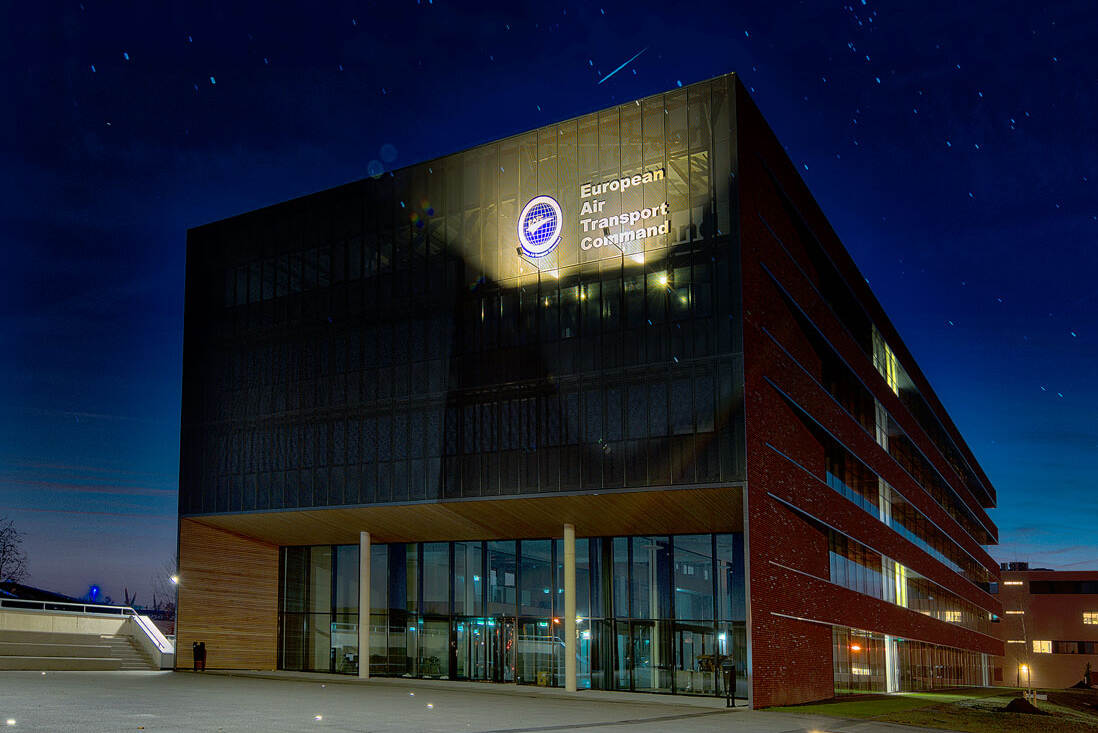
Headquarters

EATC structure in peacetime (2026)

=== Commander ===
The Commander of the EATC is a two-star general. The post rotates biennially between France and Germany.

List of Commanders
Name	Country	Took office	Left office
Major General Jochen Both	Germany	July 2010	July 2012
Major General Pascal Valentin	France	July 2012	July 2014
Major General Christian Badia	Germany	July 2014	July 2017
Major General Pascal Chiffoleau	France	July 2017	September 2018
Major General Laurent Marboeuf	France	September 2018	September 2020
Major General Andreas Schick	Germany	September 2020	September 2023
Major General Franck Mollard	France	September 2023	September 2026
Major General Frank Thomas Best	Germany	September 2026	Presente

List of Deputy Commanders
Name	Country	Took office	Left office
Brigadier General Alain Rouceau	France	July 2010	July 2012
Brigadier General Jörg Lebert	Germany	July 2012	July 2014
Brigadier General Pascal Chiffoleau	France	July 2014	July 2017
Brigadier General Andreas Schick	Germany	July 2017	September 2020
Brigadier General Paul Desair	Belgium	September 2020	December 2023
Brigadier General Patrick Mollet	Belgium	January 2023	January 2024
Major General José Luis Ortiz-Cañavate Levenfeld	Spain	February 2024	Present

=== Multinational Air Transport Committee ===
The Multinational Air Transport Committee (MATraC) is the highest level of decision-making, composed of the air chiefs of the member states. The chairman of the committee is chosen among the air chiefs for a two-year term.

=== Advisory Group ===
The Advisory Group meets on a regular basis and is composed of representatives of each member nation. The group prepares the MATraC meetings and advises the EATC Commander in implementing commonly decided policy. Expert groups may be set up on an ad hoc basis. They report to the Advisory Group.

=== Budget and Finance Committee ===
The Budget and Finance Committee comprises one representative from each member nation. The committee prepares the EATC budget and advises the MATraC on all budget and financial matters.

== Fleet ==
View chart definition.
EATC fleet (March 2018)

Fleet (March 2025)
Aircraft	Belgium	Luxembourg	Germany	Italy	France	Netherlands	Spain	Total
Airbus A310	0	0	0	0	0	0	2	2
Airbus A321	0	0	2	0	0	0	0	2
Airbus A330 MRTT	0	0	0	0	8 (Note: 4 on order)	9 (Note: 1 on order for combined MMU fleet.)	0 (Note: 3 on order.)	17
Airbus A330	0	0	0	0	3	0	0	3
Airbus A400M Atlas	7	1	38	0	19 (Note: 31 on order, being introduced into service)	0	11 (Note: 7 on order, being introduced into service.)	75
Alenia C-27J Spartan	0	0	0	7	0	0	0	7
Boeing KC-767	0	0	0	4	0	0	0	4
CASA/IPTN CN-235	0	0	0	0	27	0	0	27
Dassault Falcon 7X	2	0	0	0	0	0	0	2
EADS CASA C-295	0	0	0	0	0	0	13	13
Gulfstream 650	0	0	0	0	0	1	0	1
Lockheed C-130 Hercules	0	0	0	0	14 (Note: To be replaced by A400M.)	4	0	18
Lockheed Martin C-130J Super Hercules	0	0	3	20	2	0	0	25
Lockheed Martin KC-130	0	0	3	0	2	0	0	2
Total	9	1	46	31	75	14	26	202

== Coat of arms ==
Based on the given description, the blazon is: Argent, a terrestrial globe Azure encircled by twelve mullets Or and charged in pale with the letters "EATC" Or and a bridge Argent. Blue is the main colour of the Flag of Europe, and represents the sky, which is the general domain of air forces. The bridge symbolises the creation of connections and the overcoming of gaps and distances, and is something which can be used to reach far shores quickly and safely which is the core business of military air transport. The lettering is the abbreviation of the command. The globe expresses the global reach of air bridges. The 12 mullets are also drawn from the European Flag, and are considered a symbol of completeness and perfection.

== Relationship with EU defence policy ==
The EATC is presently not established at the EU level (referred to as the Common Security and Defence Policy, CSDP); it is for instance not a project of the Permanent Structured Cooperation (PESCO) of the CSDP. The EATC and its assets may however contribute in the implementation of the CSDP, when made available as a multinational force in accordance with article 42.3 of the Treaty on European Union (TEU).

== See also ==
- Heavy Airlift Wing
