= European Defence Agency =

Agency of the European Union

EU CSDP agency overview
- Formed: 12 July 2004; 22 years ago
- Jurisdiction: European Union
- Headquarters: Lakenweversstraat 17-21, Brussels, Belgium
- Annual budget: €56,69 million (2025)
- EU CSDP agency executives: Kaja Kallas, HR/VP, ex officio Head of the Agency and Chair of the Steering Board; André Denk, Chief Executive; Anders Sjöborg, Deputy Chief Executive
- Key document: Council Decision (CFSP) 2015/1835
- Website: eda.europa.eu

Map
- European Defence Agency (European Union)

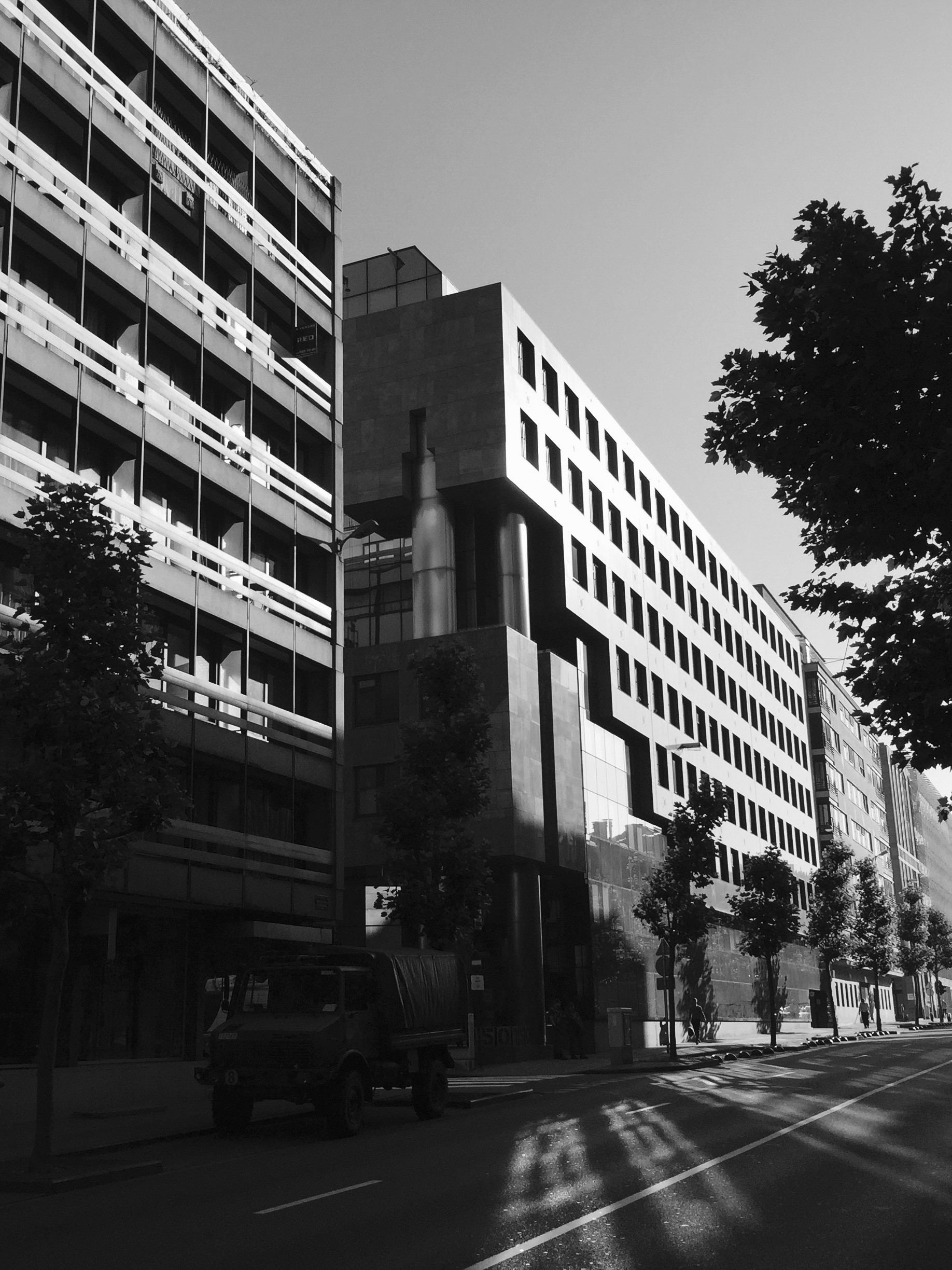
Kortenberg building

The European Defence Agency (EDA) is an agency of the European Union (EU) that promotes and facilitates integration between member states within the EU's Common Security and Defence Policy (CSDP). The EDA is headed by the EU High Representative for Foreign Affairs and Security Policy, European Commission’s Vice President (HR/VP), and reports to the Council. The EDA was established on 12 July 2004 and is based in Brussels, Belgium, along with a number of other CSDP bodies.

All EU member states take part in the agency.

The EDA and the European External Action Service (EEAS), including the EU Military staff (EUMS), together form the Secretariat of the Permanent Structured Cooperation (PESCO), the structural integration pursued by 26 of the 27 national armed forces of the EU since 2017.

== Mission ==
=== Tasks ===
The council established the EDA "to support the Member States and the Council in their effort to improve European defence capabilities in the field of crisis management and to sustain the European Security and Defence Policy as it stands now and develops in the future". Within that overall mission are three functions;

- supporting the development of defence capabilities and military cooperation among the European Union Member States;
- stimulating defence Research and Technology (R&T) and strengthening the European defence industry;
- acting as a military interface to EU policies.

EDA acts as a catalyst, promotes collaborations, launches new initiatives and introduces solutions to improve defence capabilities. It is the place where Member States willing to develop capabilities in cooperation do so. It is also a key facilitator in developing the capabilities necessary to underpin the Common Security and Defence Policy of the Union.

== Organisation ==
Current organigramme is available here

The Agency is monitored and managed in three ways.

=== Head ===
The EU HR/VP, currently Kaja Kallas, acts as the Head of the EDA. The Head is responsible for the overall organisation and functioning, ensuring the implementation of guidelines and decisions and chairing ministerial meetings of the Steering Board. Javier Solana was the inaugural head of the EDA, a position which he held from 2004 to 2009.

=== Steering Board ===
EDA's Steering Board is the agency's decision-making body. The Steering Board is composed of the defence ministers of participating Member States together with a representative of the European Commission and is led by the Head of the Agency. The Steering Board is responsible for projects such as the proposed pan-European Future Transport Helicopter.

=== Chief Executive ===
The Chief Executive, appointed by the HR/VP, is the agency's head of staff, responsible for the supervision and daily management of the agency.

List of Chief Executives
Name	Nationality	Term of office
Nick Witney	United Kingdom	2004–2007
Alexander Weis	Germany	2007–October 2010
Vacant		October 2010–January 2011
Claude-France Arnould	France	January 2011–February 2015
Jorge Domecq	Spain	February 2015 – January 2020
Jiří Šedivý	Czech Republic	April 2020 – May 2025
André Denk	Germany	May 2025 – Present

As of 16 May 2025, Major General André Denk is Chief Executive of the EDA, the first high-ranking military officer to lead the Agency since its creation in 2004.

Before taking up the post, Denk was EDA’s Deputy Chief Executive from February 2023, where he led initiatives on joint procurement of 155mm ammunition to support Ukraine. His military career includes senior roles such as Director of Logistics at the EU Military Staff and Commander of the Bundeswehr Logistics School, alongside deployments under EU, UN, and NATO mandates in Bosnia and Herzegovina, Afghanistan, and Mali.

He succeeded Jiří Šedivý, EDA’s Chief Executive from 2020 to 2025. Šedivý, a former Czech Defence Minister, was appointed on the recommendation of Josep Borrell, Head of the Agency.

== Directorates ==
Since 2019 the agency has been reorganised into four directorates.

=== Industry Synergies & Enablers Directorate ===
The Industry Synergies & Enablers Directorate supports a range of activities critical to collaborative defence capability development in Europe. On top of leading the work on identifying, together with Member States, Key Strategic Activities (KSA) at EU level, the ISE Directorate is responsible for the effective engagement with industry across the agency's activities and in support of related priorities set by Member States.

The ISE Directorate facilitates work to address the implications of EU legislation and policies for the defence sector: REACH, procurement, funding instruments and the analysis of developments influencing governmental and industrial stakeholders.

=== Capability, Armament & Planning Directorate ===
The Capability, Armament & Planning Directorate supports the coherent development of the European defence landscape by integrating EDA's involvement in the Capability Development Plan (CDP), the Coordinated Annual Review on Defence (CARD) and the Permanent Structured Cooperation (PESCO). The Directorate also identifies, plans and proposes collaborative opportunities in support of EU capability development priorities and tailored to Member States' needs, representing a coherent approach from priority setting to impact.

The Directorate is in charge of preparing the Capability Development Plan, based on the analysis of military requirements conducted together with Member States. It also identifies output- oriented EU capability development priorities and coordinates the development of Strategic Context Cases to facilitate the implementation of these priorities.

=== Research, Technology & Innovation Directorate ===
The Research, Technology & Innovation Directorate promotes and supports defence research at EU level. Based on the Overarching Strategic Research Agenda (OSRA), developed together with the Member States, the Directorate coordinates and plans joint research activities and the study of technical solutions to meet future operational needs.

The RTI Directorate provides support to Member States and to the European Commission for the Preparatory Action for defence research, including its implementation, and the research dimension of the European Defence Fund. The Directorate also ensures the promotion of innovation in defence and the exploitation of synergies at EU level with civil research in dual-use technology fields.

=== Corporate Services Directorate ===
The Corporate Services Directorate provides business and administrative support to EDA and includes units such as human resources, finance, IT, security, and infrastructure management, and the legal office.

== Budget ==
The agency is financed by its members in proportion to their Gross National Income. An effect of this is that some nations pay different contributions towards the budgets than others.

EDA's budget consists of the general budget, the budgets associated with ad hoc projects or programmes and budgets resulting from additional revenue for a total budget of €151.847 million in 2022.

This budget covers the Agency's operating costs. Individual projects are funded separately.

Budget and expenditure of the EDA
Year	Budget (€ millions)	Expenditure (€ millions)
2004	1.9	0.4
2005	20.7	12.8
2006	22.7	18.8
2007	22.4	21.5
2008	27.5	26.2
2009	29.2	28.1
2010	31.0	30.5
2011	30.5	30.5
2012	30.5	30.5
2013	30.5	30.5
2014	30.5	30.5
2015	30.5	30.1
2016	30.5	30.5
2017	31.6	31.4
2018	33.6	32.9
2019	35.3	34.7
2020	37.6	37.0
2021	37.5	36.8
2022	39.8	39.1
2023	44.8	43.2

In its draft budget for the period 2021–2027, the European Commission allocated €27.5 billion for defence and security.

== History ==
Emblem of the Western European Armaments Group, one of the EDA's precursors

The European Defence Agency is part of several decades of steadily more formal defence cooperation in Europe. Its work is a continuation of the work of the Western European Armaments Organization (WEAO) and the Western European Armaments Group (WEAG) – it effectively represents the transference of their functions from the WEU to the EU framework, and thus continues the decommissioning of the WEU.

Established by the European Council in December 2001 following the Laeken Declaration, the European Convention (also known as the Convention on the Future of Europe) was a body intended to include the main EU “stakeholders” in a major brainstorming exercise about the future direction of the European Union. Its final purpose was to produce a draft constitution for the EU to finalise and adopt. This period saw a renewed impetus for the creation of a European Defence Agency.

In its final report, the Convention working group on Defence laid out some of the foundations of what would become the European Defence Agency we know today - although the final name wasn’t there yet. “The setting up on an intergovernmental basis of a European Armaments and Strategic Research Agency was supported by many in the Group”, the official document stated. “The Agency’s initial tasks would be to ensure the fulfilment of operational requirements by promoting a policy of harmonised procurement by the Member States and to support research into defence technology, including military space systems.

A year after the Russian invasion of Ukraine in 2022, the EDA set up a project for the Common Procurement of Ammunition, looking at 155mm artillery rounds and a longer term project looking at multiple ammunition types, to support Ukraine and to replenish national stocks. By March 2023, 25 countries had joined the project. The EDA also signed an agreement in April 2023 with the United States Department of Defense designed to provide a framework for transatlantic cooperation on shared defence issues, including supply chains.

=== Relationships with non-EU European countries ===
EU and EDA members Non-EU countries with an EDA opt-in

The Agency signed Administrative Arrangements with Norway (2006), Switzerland (2012), Serbia (2013), Ukraine (2015) and the United States (2023) enabling them to participate in EDA's projects and programmes without exercising voting rights. All Administrative Arrangements are approved by the European Council. The Head of the Agency is responsible for negotiating these arrangements in accordance with directives given by the EDA Steering Board.

The departure of the United Kingdom from the EU in 2020 (Brexit) saw no mention in the EU/UK agreements of the EDA working with the UK. The UK is one of the top five defence spenders in the world and its departure meant that only France, alone in the EU, can conduct full-spectrum military operations abroad. The UK still maintains a treaty with France for a Combined Joint Expeditionary Force whether acting bilaterally or through NATO, the EU, or other coalition arrangements. On 6 October 2022, the UK joined the Military Mobility project within the EU’s Permanent Structured Cooperation (PESCO) framework.

== See also ==
=== CSDP leadership ===
- High Representative
- European Council
- Foreign Affairs Council

=== CSDP structures ===
- Directorate-General for Defence Industry and Space
- European External Action Service
  - European Union Intelligence and Situation Centre
  - European Security and Defence College
- Permanent Structured Cooperation
  - Committee of Permanent Representatives
  - Political and Security Committee
  - Politico-Military Group
  - Military Committee
  - Committee for Civilian Aspects of Crisis Management
- European Union Institute for Security Studies
- European Union Satellite Centre

=== Other structures ===
- Franco-British Defence and Security Cooperation Treaty and Downing Street Declaration
- NATO Science and Technology Organization
- Organisation for Joint Armament Cooperation (OCCAR)

=== Related ===
- List of countries in Europe by military expenditures
