= Joint Expeditionary Force (disambiguation) =

The Joint Expeditionary Force is a United Kingdom-led expeditionary force which consists of Denmark, Finland, Estonia, Iceland, Latvia, Lithuania, the Netherlands, Sweden, and Norway. It may also refer to:

- Joint Expeditionary Force (Maritime), the Royal Navy's contribution to the above force, from 2010
- Combined Joint Expeditionary Force, a combined Anglo-French expeditionary force, from 2010
