= Expeditionary warfare =

Deployment of a state's military to fight abroad

Expeditionary warfare is a military invasion of a foreign territory, especially away from established bases. Expeditionary forces were in part the antecedent of the modern concept of rapid deployment forces. Traditionally, expeditionary forces were essentially self-sustaining with an organic logistics capability and with a full array of supporting arms.

== In the ancient world ==
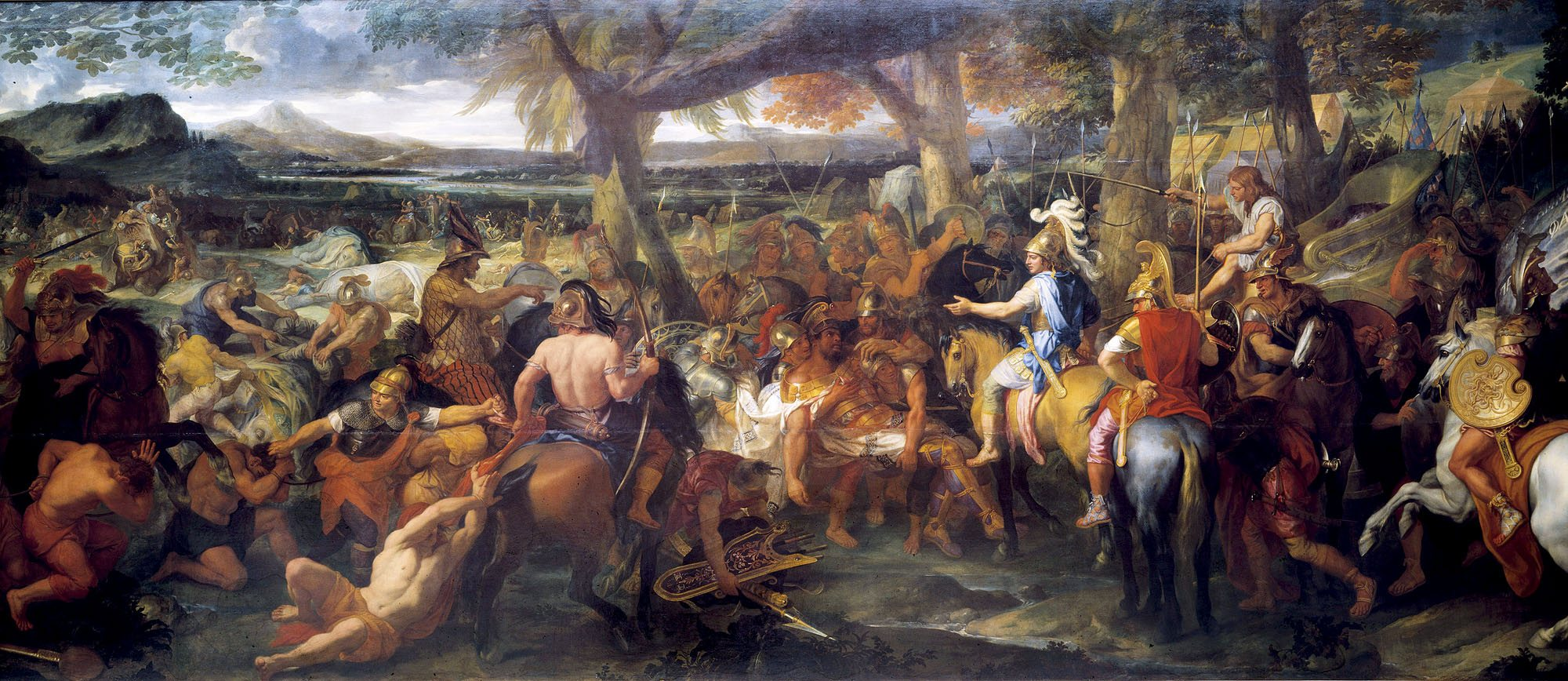
Alexander the Great fighting in India

The earliest examples of expeditionary warfare come from the Sea Peoples, a term used for a confederation of seafaring raiders of the second millennium BC who sailed into the eastern shores of the Mediterranean, caused political unrest, and attempted to enter or control Egyptian territory during the late 19th dynasty, and especially during Year 8 of Ramesses III of the 20th dynasty.

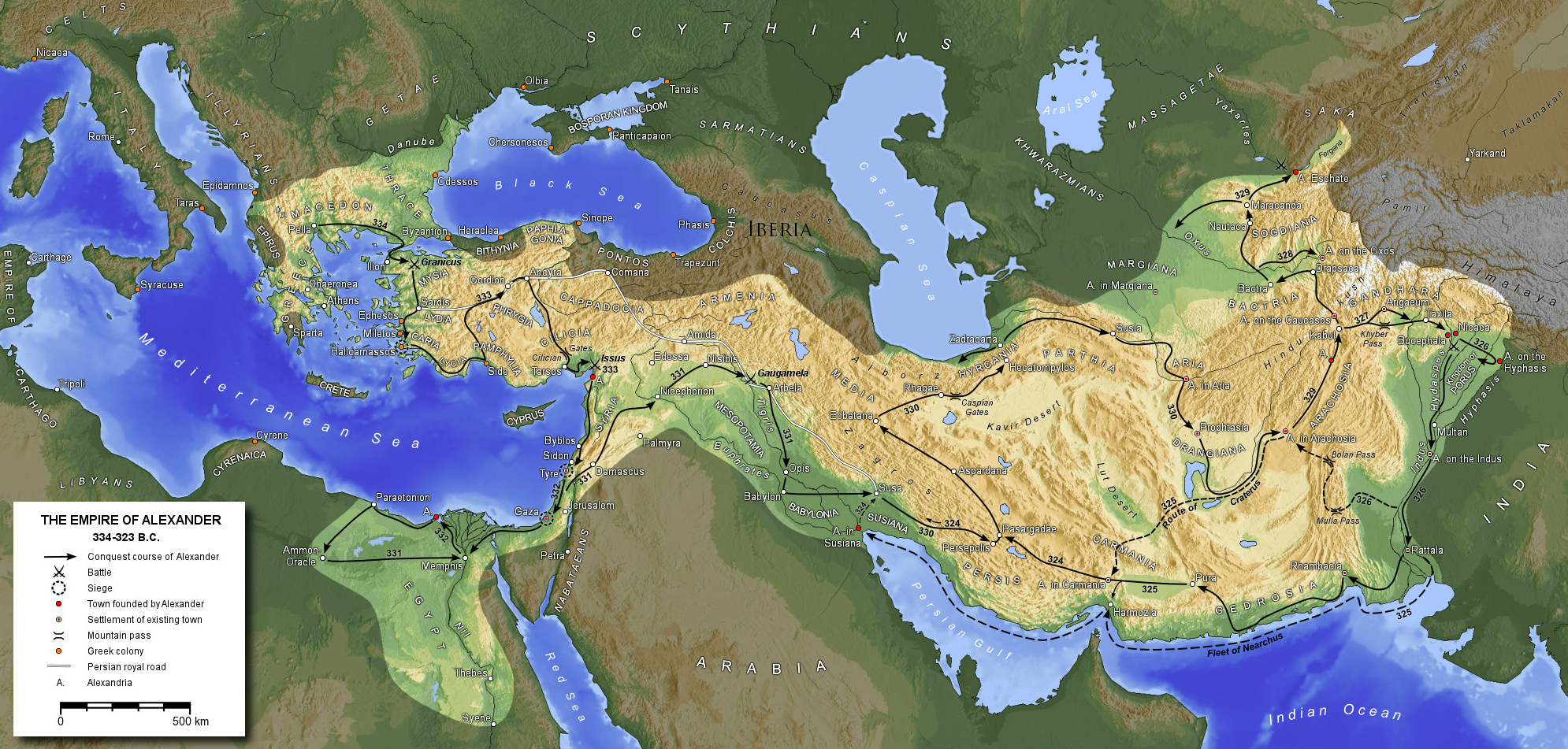
Empire of Alexander the Great

The raiding tactics were expanded into the more complex expeditionary warfare operations by Alexander the Great who used naval vessels for both troop transporting and logistics in his campaigns against the Persian Empire.

The next exponents of expeditionary warfare in the ancient world of the Mediterranean Basin were the Carthaginians who introduced two entirely new dimensions to the use of naval forces by staging not only operations that combined naval and land troops, but also eventuated in combining strategic multi-national forces during the land phase of the operation when Hannibal in his most famous achievement at the outbreak of the Second Punic War marched an army, which included war elephants, from Iberia over the Pyrenees and the Alps into Northern Italy.

Following on the example of Carthage, the Romans used expeditionary operations extensively to expand their Empire and influence in the Mediterranean and beyond, including the Roman conquest of Britain which was not only a limited expeditionary operation, but one conceived to include long-term occupation and Roman settlement of the territories.

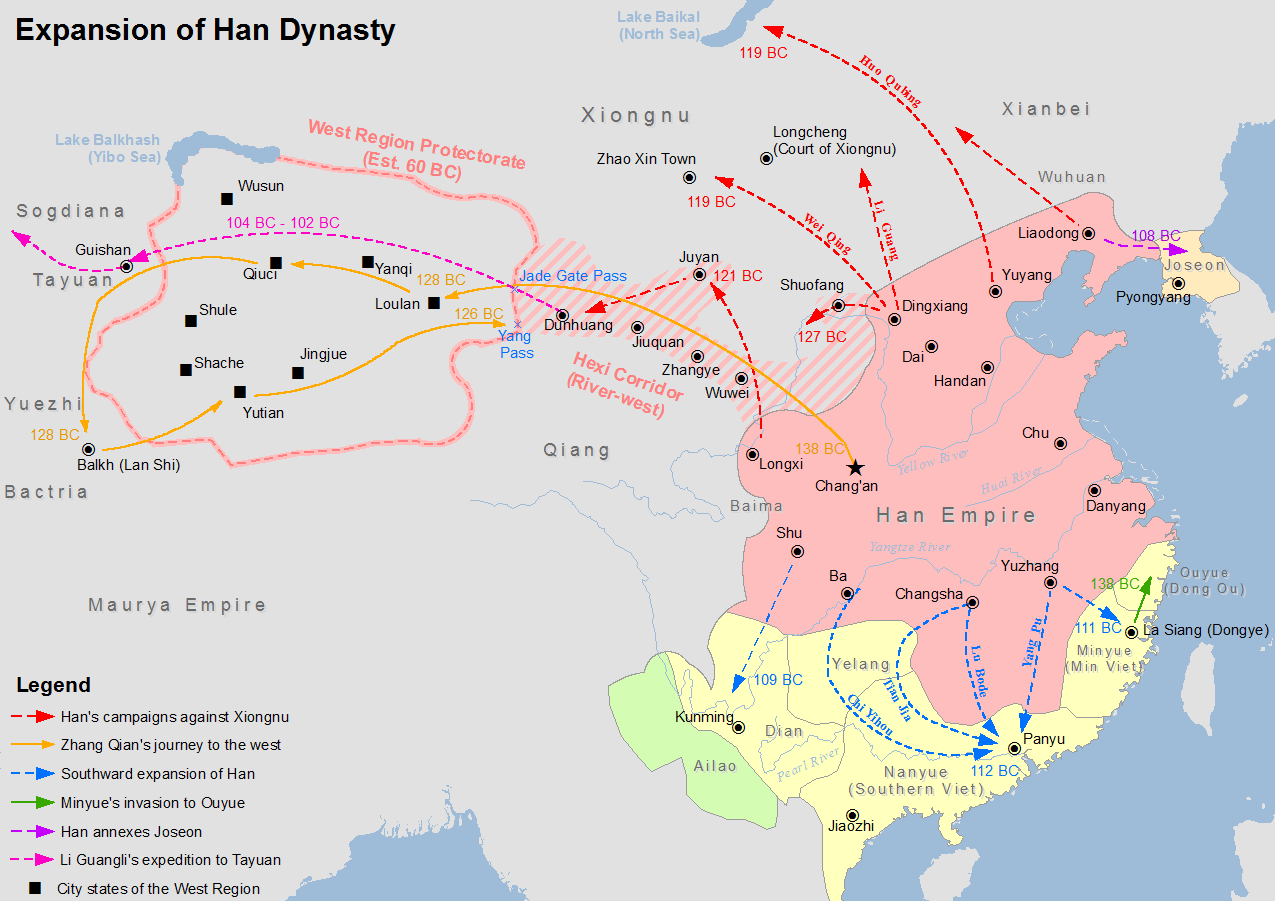
Han campaigns against the Xiongnu, shown in red

The Han dynasty of ancient China also famously used expeditionary warfare to deal with the nomadic Xiongnu people during the Han–Xiongnu War. Under the orders of Emperor Wu of Han, the Han launched numerous long-distance raids deep into Xiongnu territory. The exploits of famed Han generals Wei Qing and Huo Qubing were of particular note, with both recording multiple successful expeditions between the years 127 and 119 BC, eventually annexing the Hexi Corridor and expelling the Xiongnu from the Qilian Mountains. The expeditionary Han forces were primarily made up of cavalry and were typically arrayed in columns. They also frequently crossed vast distances–Huo Qubing is said to have travelled 2,000 li, roughly 620 miles/1000 km, during one of his raids.

== In the Middle Ages ==
Shortly after the collapse of the Roman empire in Italy, the European Middle Ages began with an expedition of imperial Byzantine general Belisarius against the Vandals. But as that empire dwindled, its warfare became more defensive.

The most prominent development of expeditionary warfare during the Middle Ages came from the environmental pressures in the Scandinavian region during the Middle Ages, and the emergence of the Viking migrations that combined raiding, longer term inland operations, occupation and settlement. These operations were conducted as sea, coastal and riverine operations, and sometimes were strategic in nature, reaching as far as Constantinople.

Expeditionary warfare in East Asia began very much in the same way it had in the Mediterranean with short-term raids by Japanese pirates. Because the wokou were weakly resisted by the Ming dynasty, the raiding eventually developed into fully-fledged expeditionary warfare with the Japanese invasions of Korea (1592–1598).

=== During the Crusades ===
The development of expeditionary operations reached a new level when, during the Crusades, the element of political alliance as an influence on military strategy was introduced, for example in the Sixth Crusade (AD 1228.)

== The rise of European colonial empires ==
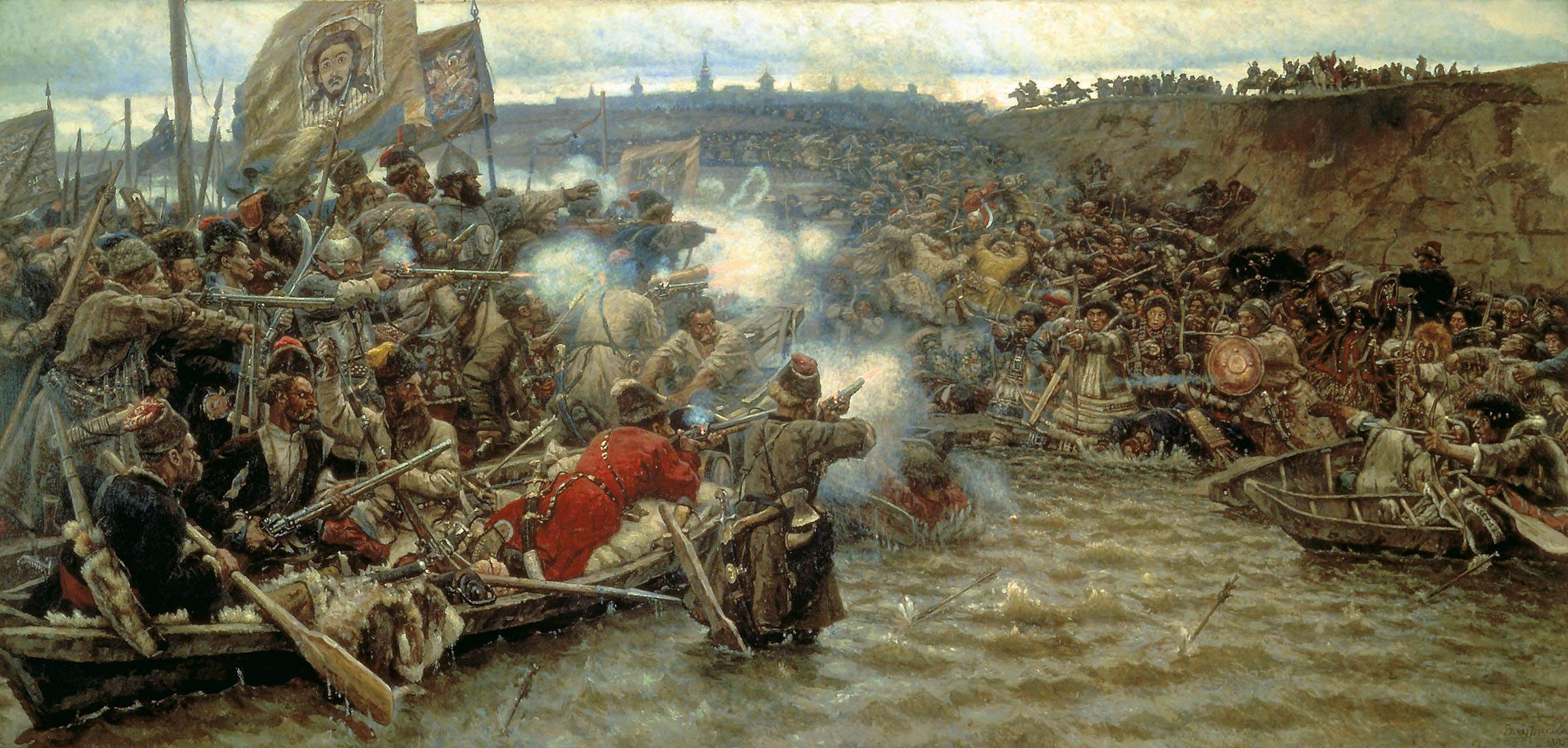
"Yermak's conquest of Siberia", a painting by Russian artist Vasily Surikov depicting the Russian conquest of Siberia.

Although all expeditionary warfare until the invention of the combustion engine was largely dependent on sailing vessels, it was with the creation of sophisticated rigging systems of the European Renaissance that the Age of Sail allowed a significant expansion in expeditionary warfare, notably by the European colonial empires such as the Spanish conquests of Mexico, Peru, and the Philippines, far from Spanish bases. Some have argued that this was the first revolution in military affairs that changed national strategies, operational methods, and tactics both at sea and on the land.

Though a significantly expanded expeditionary operation, the Crimean War was the first example of a planned expeditionary campaign that was directed as part of a multinational coalition strategy. It was also the first modern expeditionary operation that used steam-powered warships and telegraph communications.

The next development in the evolution of the expeditionary warfare was made during the expansion of the western European empires and the era of colonialism that also led to the inclusion of the expeditionary methods into the direct expression of national strategies to avoid full-scale conflicts in the shape of the gunboat diplomacy approach. It was at this time that naval troops previously used almost exclusively for defence of vessels or minor beach operations were expanded to enable extended littoral operations. The colonial experience, though largely confined to the period before the First World War, persisted well into the 20th century.

== The World Wars ==
=== First World War ===
The period of the First World War and its aftermath in the 1920s saw expeditionary warfare established as a systematic and planned type of operations with larger scope than simple transportations of troops to the theatre, such as the British Expeditionary Force in 1914, Russian Expeditionary Force in 1916, and the American Expeditionary Forces in 1917, and the beginnings of development in true combined operations at strategic, operational and tactical levels with the unsuccessful amphibious landing at Gallipoli. Not only did this operation combine the elements of overall war planning context, multinational deployment of forces as part of the same operation, and use of troops prepared for the landings (as opposed to disembarkation), as well as naval gunfire support that was limited during the era of sailing ships, but also included extensive use of combat engineering in support of the infantry. One of the most extensive and complex of expeditionary operations that followed the war was the Allied intervention in the Russian Civil War that saw forces deployed in the Baltic region, the Arctic region, along the Black Sea coast, and in the Russian Far East.

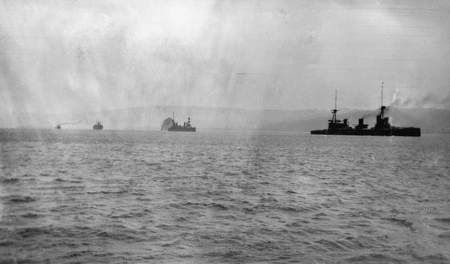
A squadron of the Australian Naval and Military Expeditionary Force off New Britain in September 1914

Other expeditionary forces during World War I included:

- Canadian Expeditionary Force, 1914–1920
- First Australian Imperial Force (Europe), 1914–1921
- Indian Expeditionary Force, 1914–1918
- Hejaz Expeditionary Force (Ottoman Empire), 1916–1919
- South African Overseas Expeditionary Force, 1915–1919
- New Zealand Expeditionary Force, 1914–1918
- Portuguese Expeditionary Corps, 1917–1918
- Brazilian Naval Division in War Operations, 1918–1919
- Italian II Corps in France, 1918–1919
- Siamese Expeditionary Forces, 1917–1919
- 2nd Special Squadron (Japanese Navy), 1917–1919

=== Second World War ===
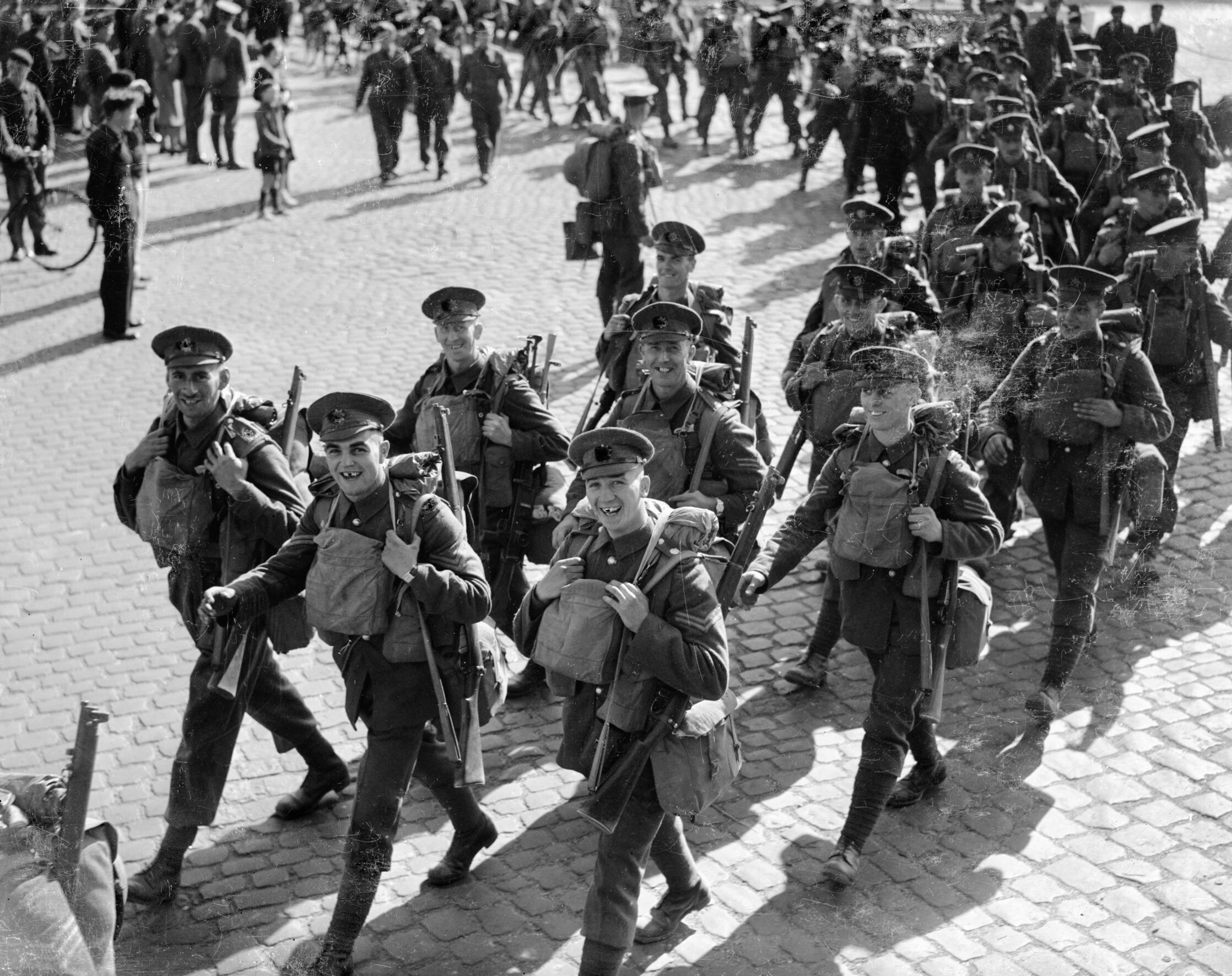
Coldstream Guards of the British Expeditionary Force arrive in Cherbourg, France, 1939

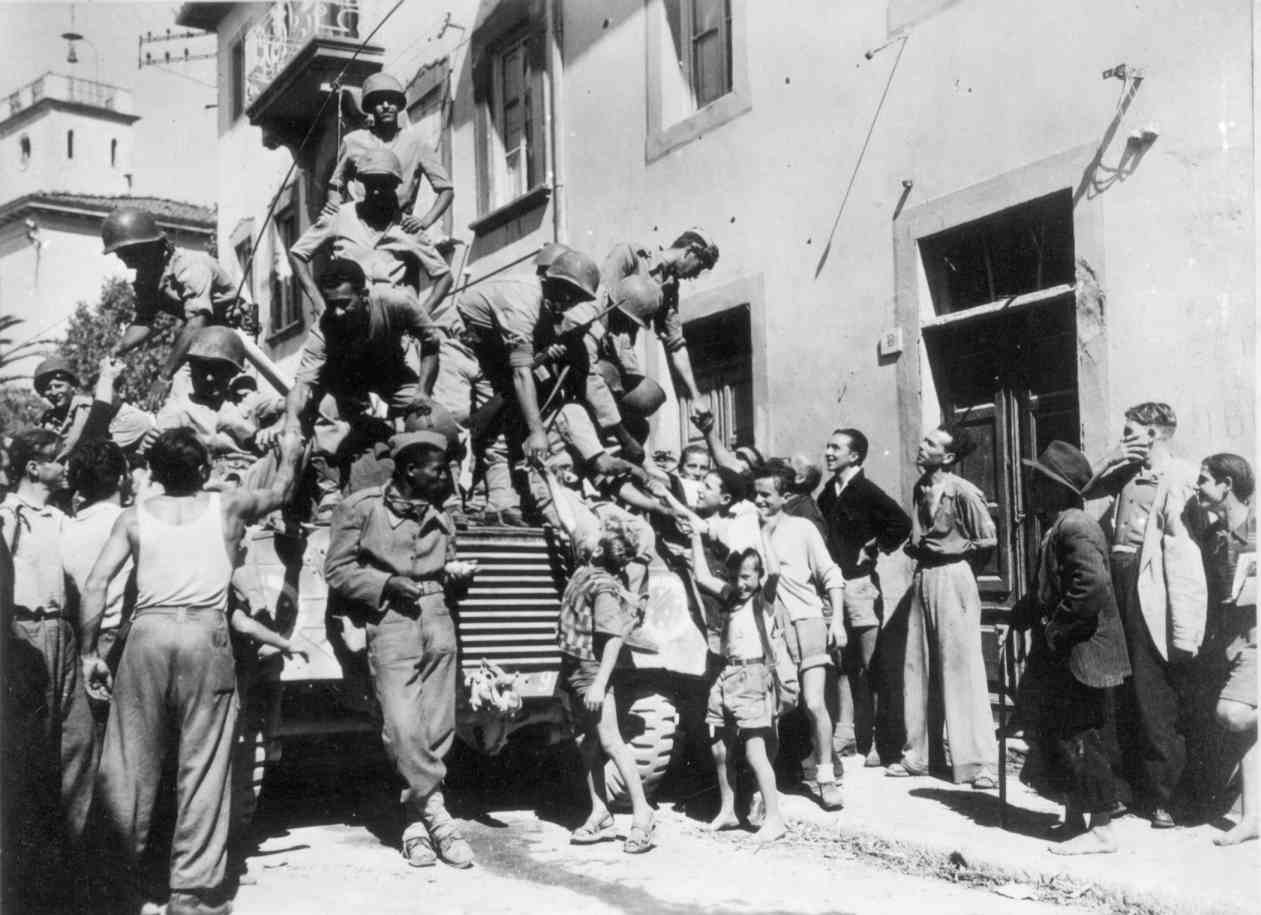
Brazilian soldiers of the Brazilian Expeditionary Force greet civilians in Massarosa, Italy, September 1944.

- Afrika Korps (Nazi Germany)
- Corpo Aereo Italiano (Fascist Italy)
- Corpo Truppe Volontarie
- Brazilian Expeditionary Force
- British Expeditionary Force
- Canadian Corps
- China Expeditionary Army (Imperial Japan)
- Chinese Expeditionary Force (Chinese Army)
- Italian Expeditionary Corps in Russia
- Second Australian Imperial Force
- Mexican Expeditionary Air Force

== Contemporary ==
=== European Union ===
- EU Battlegroup
- European Maritime Force

=== NATO ===
- Allied Reaction Force
- Allied Rapid Reaction Corps

=== United Kingdom ===
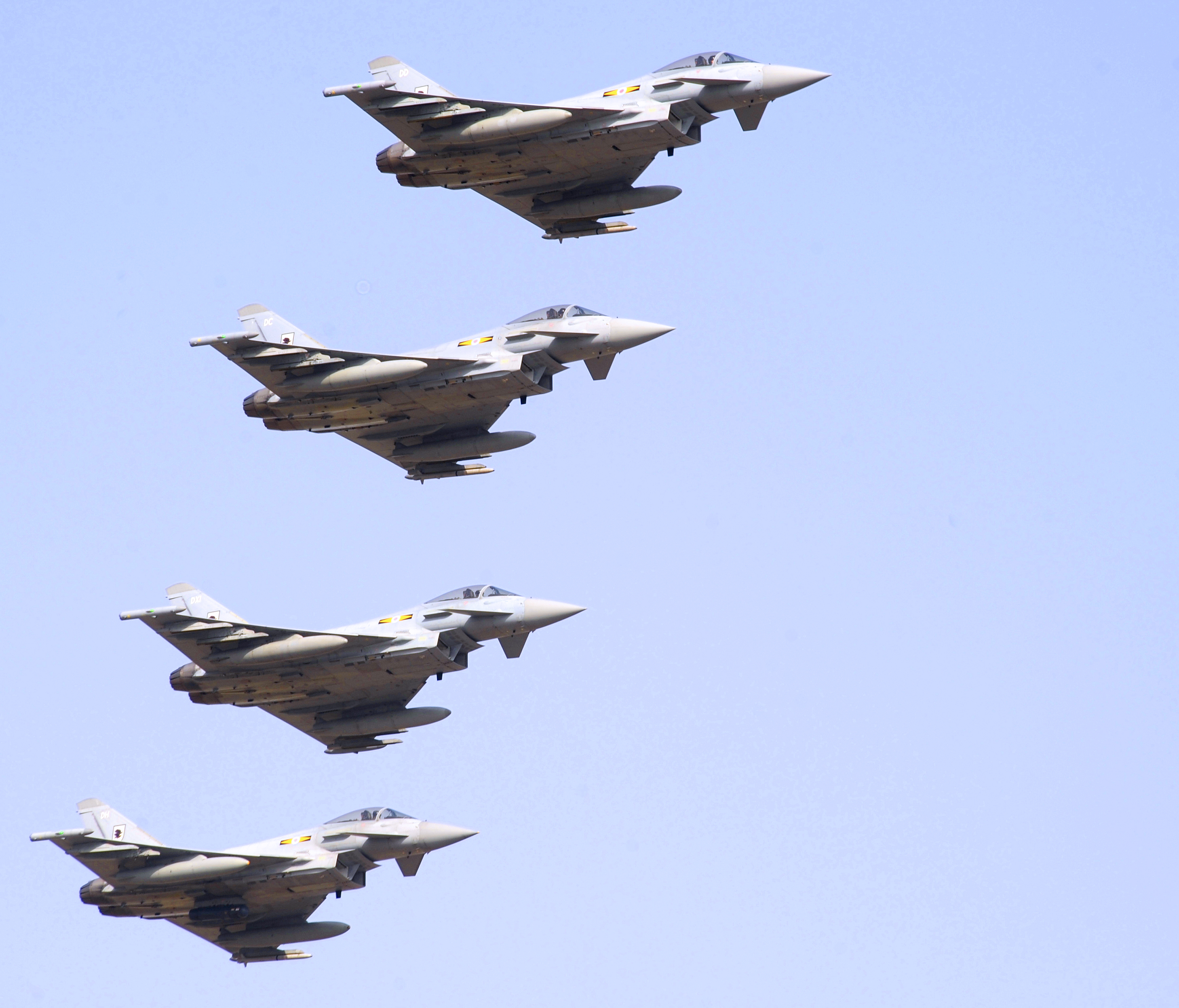
Royal Air Force Typhoons from No. 121 Expeditionary Air Wing

- 3rd Division (United Kingdom)
- 16 Air Assault Brigade
- 3 Commando Brigade
- Joint Expeditionary Force (Maritime)
- Joint Expeditionary Force
- Combined Joint Expeditionary Force
- Joint Rapid Reaction Force
- Littoral Response Group
- No. 83 Expeditionary Air Group
  - No. 901 Expeditionary Air Wing
  - No. 902 Expeditionary Air Wing
  - No. 903 Expeditionary Air Wing
  - No. 904 Expeditionary Air Wing
  - No. 906 Expeditionary Air Wing
- Expeditionary Air Wing
  - No. 34 Expeditionary Air Wing
  - No. 38 Expeditionary Air Wing
  - No. 121 Expeditionary Air Wing
  - No. 135 Expeditionary Air Wing
  - No. 138 Expeditionary Air Wing
  - No. 140 Expeditionary Air Wing

=== United States ===
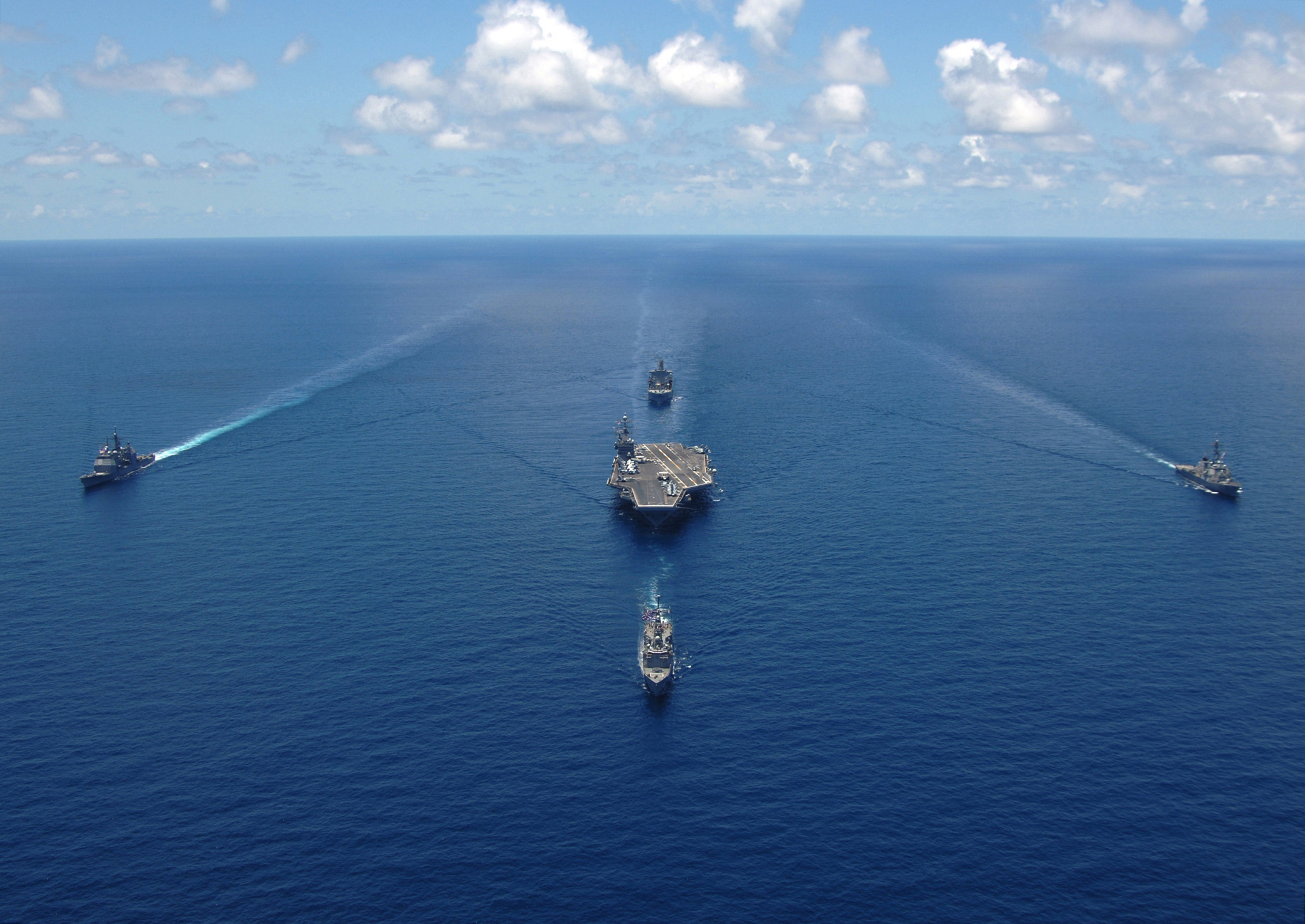
Carrier Strike Group

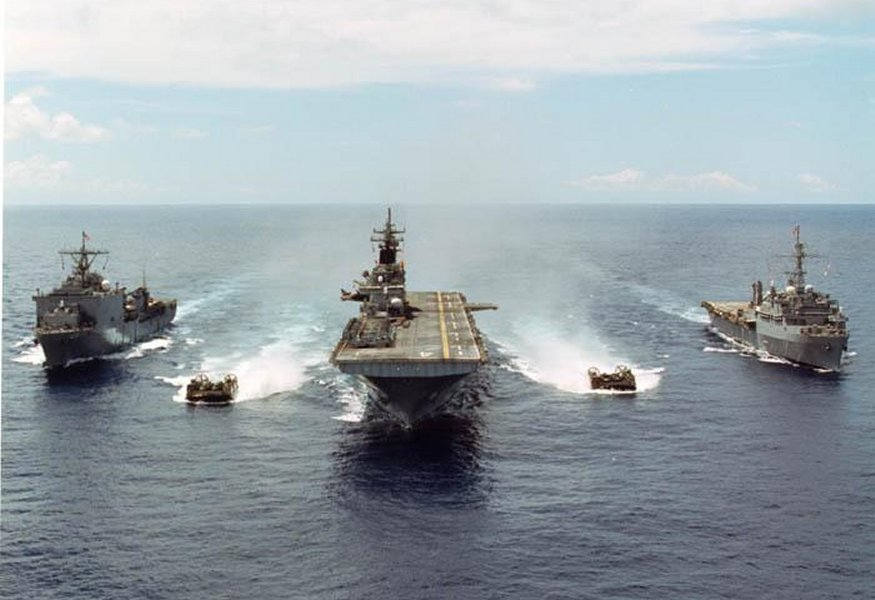
Expeditionary Strike Group

- Carrier Strike Group
  - Carrier Strike Group 1
  - Carrier Strike Group 2
  - Carrier Strike Group 3
  - Carrier Strike Group 5
  - Carrier Strike Group 8
  - Carrier Strike Group 9
  - Carrier Strike Group 10
  - Carrier Strike Group 11
  - Carrier Strike Group 12
- Navy Expeditionary Combat Command
- Expeditionary Strike Group
- Marine Expeditionary Force
  - I Marine Expeditionary Force
  - II Marine Expeditionary Force
  - III Marine Expeditionary Force
- Marine Expeditionary Brigade
  - 1st Marine Expeditionary Brigade
  - 2nd Marine Expeditionary Brigade
  - 3rd Marine Expeditionary Brigade
- Marine Expeditionary Unit
  - 11th Marine Expeditionary Unit
  - 13th Marine Expeditionary Unit
  - 15th Marine Expeditionary Unit
  - 22nd Marine Expeditionary Unit
  - 24th Marine Expeditionary Unit
  - 26th Marine Expeditionary Unit
  - 31st Marine Expeditionary Unit
- List of Air Expeditionary units of the United States Air Force (43 of them)
- Immediate Response Force

== See also ==
- Blue-water navy
- Expeditionary energy economics
- Expeditionary maneuver warfare
- Loss of Strength Gradient
- Military deployment
- Military logistics
- Over-the-beach capability
- Power projection
- Seabasing
- Unsinkable aircraft carrier
