= Immediate Response Force =

Rapid deployment force jointly maintained by the U.S. Army and U.S. Air Force

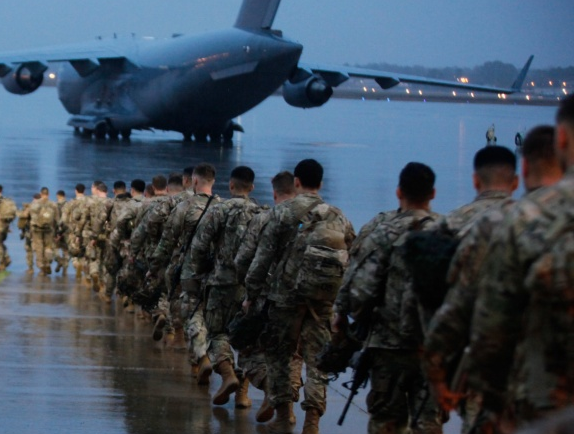
- Paratroopers assigned to the Immediate Response Force make their way to a U.S. Air Force transport during an emergency deployment in January 2020
- Allegiance: United States
- Type: Rapid deployment force

The Immediate Response Force (IRF) is a rapid deployment force jointly maintained by the United States Army and United States Air Force, which is capable of deploying worldwide within 18 hours of notification.

== Background ==
In 1980, the United States formed the Rapid Deployment Joint Task Force (RDJTF) as a rapid reaction force under the U.S. Readiness Command. Composed of contingently assigned units from the United States Army, United States Air Force, United States Navy, and United States Marine Corps, its mandate was to rapidly deploy to confront worldwide threats to American interests. With the passage of the 1986 Goldwater-Nichols Act, the relevance of a force with planet-wide responsibilities became less apparent and the RDJTF was deactivated.

In the 2000s, the Global Response Force (GRF) was created as a pooled reserve of CONUS-based military assets that could be used to rapidly reinforce one of the Unified Combatant Commands in the event of an emergent threat to American interests within a command's geographic area of responsibility. It was replaced with the Immediate Response Force.

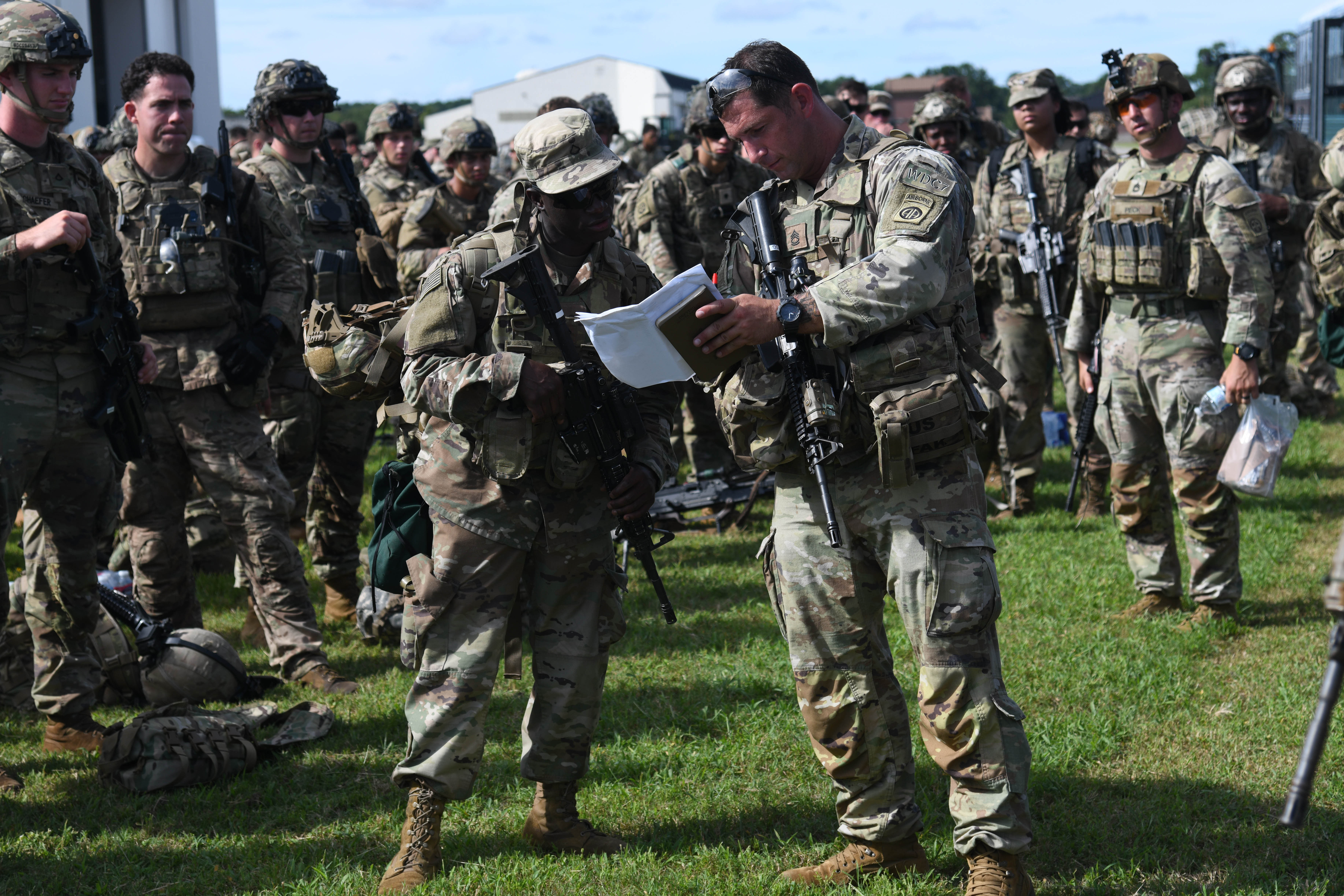
82nd Airborne IRF paratroopers receive a briefing at Pope Field before deploying to Afghanistan during Operation Allies Refuge, August 2021

== Operational history ==
- In January 2020, the IRF's first emergency deployment occurred and consisted of the 1st Brigade Combat Team, 82nd Airborne Division plus supporting Air Force assets. The deployment was to the Middle East and was in response to a prior attack on the U.S. embassy in Iraq.
- In June 2020, one infantry battalion of the IRF deployed to Fort Belvoir in response to riots in Washington, D.C. The unit remained on standby until dismissed by Secretary of Defense Mark Esper.
- In August 2021, the IRF's 1st Brigade Combat Team, 82nd Airborne Division was deployed to Afghanistan during Operation Allies Refuge.
- In 2022, elements of the 82nd Airborne, which makes up the core of the IRF, were mobilized and deployed to eastern Europe in support of NATO during the prelude to the Russian invasion of Ukraine.

== Structure ==
The IRF is built around a Brigade Combat Team of the 82nd Airborne Division and the 10th Mountain Division. A rotating battalion of each brigade, along with Air Force Air Mobility Command assets, is kept at a high alert level to allow it to undertake an airborne deployment on 18 hours notice with no prior warning. This initial "entry force" of the IRF is designed to be followed by additional battalions within a period of days.

== See also ==
- Joint Rapid Reaction Force (United Kingdom)
- Joint Expeditionary Force (Northern Europe)
- Allied Rapid Reaction Corps (NATO)
- Marine expeditionary unit
- Expeditionary warfare
