= 1st Brigade Combat Team, 82nd Airborne Division =

Brigade of the U.S. Army

The 1st Brigade Combat Team, 82nd Airborne Division is an active Airborne Brigade of the United States Army.

== History ==
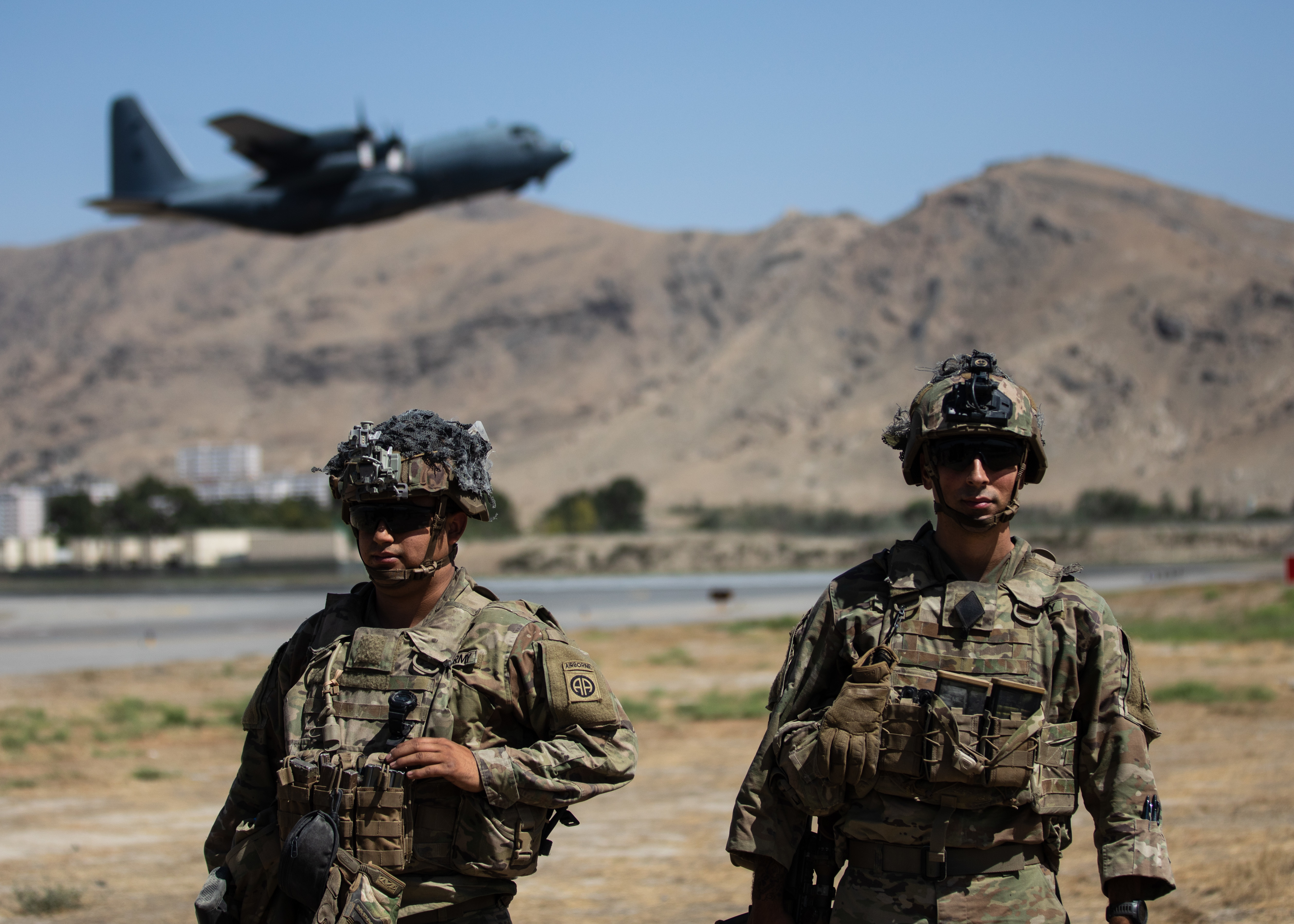
Paratroopers assigned to the 1st Brigade Combat Team, 82nd Airborne Division conduct security detail at Hamid Karzai International Airport during Operation Allies Refuge in 2021.

== Lineage and honors ==
=== Lineage ===
- Constituted 5 August 1917 in the National Army as Headquarters Troop, 82d Division
- Organized 25 August 1917 at Camp Gordon, Georgia
- Demobilized 27 May 1919 at Camp Mills, New York
- Reconstituted 24 June 1921 in the Organized Reserves as Headquarters Company, 82d Division
- Organized in January 1922 at Columbia, South Carolina
- Reorganized and redesignated 13 February 1942 as Headquarters and Military Police Company (less Military Police Platoon), 82d Division
- Ordered into active military service 25 March 1942 and reorganized at Camp Claiborne, Louisiana
- Reorganized and redesignated 15 August 1942 as Headquarters Company, 82d Airborne Division

(Organized Reserves redesignated 25 March 1948 as the Organized Reserve Corps)

- Withdrawn 15 November 1948 from the Organized Reserve Corps and allotted to the Regular Army
- Reorganized and redesignated 1 September 1957 as Headquarters and Headquarters Company, Command and Control Battalion, 82d Airborne Division
- Reorganized and redesignated 25 May 1964 as Headquarters and Headquarters Company, 1st Brigade, 82d Airborne Division
- Headquarters, 1st Brigade, 82d Airborne Division, reorganized and redesignated 16 June 2006 as Headquarters, 1st Brigade Combat Team, 82d Airborne Division (Headquarters Company, 1st Brigade, 82d Airborne Division – hereafter separate lineage)

=== Campaign participation credit ===
- World War I: St. Mihiel; Meuse-Argonne; Lorraine 1918
- World War II: Sicily; Naples-Foggia; Normandy (with arrowhead); Rhineland (with arrowhead); Ardennes-Alsace; Central Europe
- Armed Forces Expeditions: Dominican Republic; Panama (with arrowhead)
- Southwest Asia: Defense of Saudi Arabia; Liberation and Defense of Kuwait
- War on Terrorism: Campaigns to be determined
  - Afghanistan: Consolidation I; Transition I
  - Iraq: Transition of Iraq; Iraqi Surge; Iraqi Sovereignty

Note: The published US Army lineage lists "Campaigns to be determined" as of December 2011. Comparison of the BCT's deployment dates with War on Terrorism campaigns shows that the BCT is entitled to the 5 campaigns listed.

=== Decorations ===
- Presidential Unit Citation (Army), Streamer embroidered STE. MERE EGLISE
- Valorous Unit Award, Streamer embroidered AFGHANISTAN 2003
- Meritorious Unit Commendation (Army), Streamer embroidered SOUTHWEST ASIA 1990–1991
- Meritorious Unit Commendation (Army), Streamer embroidered IRAQ 2010
- French Croix de Guerre with Palm, World War II, Streamer embroidered STE. MERE EGLISE
- French Croix de Guerre with Palm, World War II, Streamer embroidered COTENTIN
- French Croix de Guerre, World War II, Fourragere
- Belgian Fourragere 1940

Cited in the Order of the Day of the Belgian Army for action in the Ardennes
Cited in the Order of the Day of the Belgian Army for action in Belgium and Germany

- Military Order of William (Degree of the Knight of the Fourth Class), Streamer embroidered NIJMEGEN 1944
- Netherlands Orange Lanyard

== See also ==
NATO Map Symbol

1

82 Abn

- Immediate Response Force
