= Combined Joint Expeditionary Force =

Joint UK–French multi-component expeditionary force

Combined Joint Expeditionary Force Force expéditionnaire interarmées combinée
- France and the United Kingdom and territories
- Founded: 2010
- Countries: France; United Kingdom
- Type: Expeditionary Force
- Role: Combat operations
- Size: 10,000 personnel To be increased to 50,000
- HQ: Combined Joint Force Headquarters, Northwood HQ
- Components: Maritime component Land component Air component Logistics component

The Combined Joint Expeditionary Force (CJEF, French: Force expéditionnaire interarmées combinée, FEIC) is a UK–French military force. It draws upon both the British Armed Forces and the French Armed Forces to field a deployable force with land, air and maritime components together with command and control and supporting logistics.

== Background ==
The Combined Joint Expeditionary Force is envisaged as a deployable, combined UK–French military force for use in a wide range of crisis scenarios, up to and including high intensity combat operations. As a joint force it involves all three armed services: a land component composed of formations at national brigade level, maritime and air components with their associated headquarters, together with logistics and support functions.

The CJEF is not conceived as a standing force; instead, is available at short notice for UK–French bilateral, NATO, European Union, United Nations or other operations. Combined air and land exercises commenced during 2011 with a view towards developing a full capability. The CJEF is also seen as a potential stimulus towards greater interoperability and coherence in military doctrine, training and equipment requirements.

The UK and French defence ministries have jointly produced a User Guide (in English) to assist military staff operating at the operational and higher tactical levels of CJEF operations. This guide, jointly developed by the Development, Concepts and Doctrine Centre at Shrivenham, UK, and the Centre Interarmées de Concepts, de Doctrine et d'Expérimentations in Paris, has been published on the French Ministry of Defence website.

== History and development ==
In 2010, the governments of the UK and France signed the Lancaster House Treaties which committed both governments to the creation of an Anglo-French Combined Joint Expeditionary Force (CJEF). This was outlined as

"We will develop a Combined Joint Expeditionary Force suitable for a wide range of scenarios, up to and including high intensity operations. It will involve all three Services: there will be a land component comprised of formations at national brigade level, maritime and air components with their associated Headquarters, and logistics and support functions. It will not involve standing forces but will be available at notice for bilateral, NATO, European Union, United Nations or other operations. We will begin with combined air and land exercises during 2011 and will develop the concept before the next UK-France Summit and progress towards full capability in subsequent years. The Force will stimulate greater interoperability and coherence in military doctrine, training and equipment requirements."

In 2012, the UK-France Summit revealed further information on the CJEF. The two governments reaffirmed their commitments, stating that their recent expeditionary operations in Libya had proven the CJEF's relevance. It was announced that the CJEF would be operational from 2016 and that it would be "an early entry force capable of facing multiple threats up to the highest intensity". The two governments also agreed to continue the development of a joint maritime task group force which would be available by 2020 and comprise maritime assets owned by both countries. A joint exercise, named Exercise Corsican Lion, was also announced to test and further develop the CJEF, which subsequently took place in October 2012.

In 2013, a large-scale joint amphibious exercise in the Red Sea, named Exercise Djibouti Lion, was cancelled. British Defence Minister Mark Francois stated that it was cancelled due to "administrative issues" and not due to a lack of resources as the media had reported.

During the 2014 UK-France Summit, both governments announced that "good progress" was being made on the delivery of the CJEF. The creation of an integrated national Joint Task Force Headquarters was announced, as well as a Combined Logistics Support Group to sustain the CJEF. Two major exercises to take place in 2015 and 2016 were also announced.

In April 2016, Exercise Griffin Strike began to take place in the UK involving up to 5,000 personnel. It was dubbed the CJEF's "biggest development test" by the UK Ministry of Defence and involved land, air and sea components. Eurofighter Typhoon fighters of the Royal Air Force and Dassault Rafale fighters of the French Air Force were deployed to RAF Leeming in North Yorkshire. At sea, Royal Navy ships, including HMS Ocean, HMS Bulwark and HMS Duncan, combined with French Navy ships, including the Dixmude, Cassard and La Motte-Picquet. On land, elements of the British Army’s 3rd (UK) Division and the French Army's 7th Mechanised Brigade, including paratroopers, armoured units and infantrymen, came together.

== Structure of CJEF ==
=== Role ===
The CJEF comprises strategic, operational and tactical level Command and Control elements, together with deployable sea, land, air and logistical components.

It is seen as being able to conduct offensive and defensive operations on land, in the air, and at sea. It is designed to be rapidly deployable and, once ready in theatre, to be sustainable for up to three months of operations as a stand-alone force; as well as having the ability to include other nations as coalition partners. The UK and France see the following as the most likely tasks for the CJEF:

- crisis management, involving early entry into a potentially hostile territory (including the initial enforcement of no-fly zones, embargoes and sanctions);
- the protection of shared national interests abroad;
- extraction operations;
- non-combatant evacuation operations;
- the temporary strengthening of a peacekeeping operation;
- support to emergency humanitarian assistance.

=== Command and control ===
At the strategic level command and control (C2) is exercised via a CJEF Current Commitments Team (CCT) which takes its direction jointly from the UK's Chief of the Defence Staff and France's Chef d’État Major des Armées.

The CJEF CCT provides strategic military direction to the CJEF Operational Headquarters (OHQ) which, depending on circumstances, is to be based either in the UK at Permanent Joint Headquarters Northwood or in France at Fort Mont-Valérien.

The OHQ carries out operational level planning with the conduct of the operation being commanded by the deployed tactical headquarters the Combined Joint Force Headquarters (CJFHQ). The C2 arrangements are summarised as follows:

- Strategic level – CJEF Current Commitments Team (CCT)
- Operational level – CJEF Operational Headquarters (OHQ)
- Tactical level – deployable Combined Joint Force Headquarters (CJFHQ), and as required:
1. Combined Logistics Support Group (CLSG) headquarters.
2. Maritime component commander.
3. Land component commander.
4. Air component commander.

=== Deployable Components ===
The CJEF is planned to be able to deploy maritime, land, and air components with the CJFHQ commanding these either directly or via individual component commanders.

- A maritime component of up to a naval task group based on one or more capital ships, with the maritime forces required to conduct a particular CJEF operation being primarily depend on the circumstances. The component may include any combination of UK and French maritime assets gathered in a task group, and commanded from a UK/French combined headquarters that could be led by either nation.
- A scalable land component of at least a UK battle-group and a French battle-group. It is to be capable of conducting non-enduring, complex intervention operations, facing multiple threats up to high intensity. It is planned as a high-readiness force using existing national high readiness force elements – including lead elements at very short notice.
- An air component comprising an expeditionary air wing that is self-sufficient and capable of being generated within 10 days of activation. This will include all air assets across the full spectrum of air power roles. It is envisaged that the air component will be able to deliver the full spectrum of air effects.
- A logistics component with which the UK and France envisage collaborating to share the logistics support of the CJEF. Cooperative logistic planning is foreseen as commencing at the earliest opportunity and logistic operations will typically be commanded by a Combined Logistics Support Group headquarters, subordinate to the CJTF headquarters.

== Relationship to European Union Defence Policy ==
While the CJEF may be used for European Union (EU) tasks with the agreement of both the French and the UK governments, it is not formally part of the EU's Common Security and Defence Policy. It does not use the Lisbon Treaty’s Permanent Structured Cooperation facility, nor does it involve the European Defence Agency.

== See also ==
- Entente frugale
- Eurocorps
- France–United Kingdom relations
- Franco-German Brigade
- Response Force Task Group
- Joint Expeditionary Force
- Joint Rapid Reaction Force
- Allied Rapid Reaction Corps
- European Intervention Initiative
