= Joint Expeditionary Force (Maritime) =

Royal Navy's contribution to the UK-led Joint Expeditionary Force

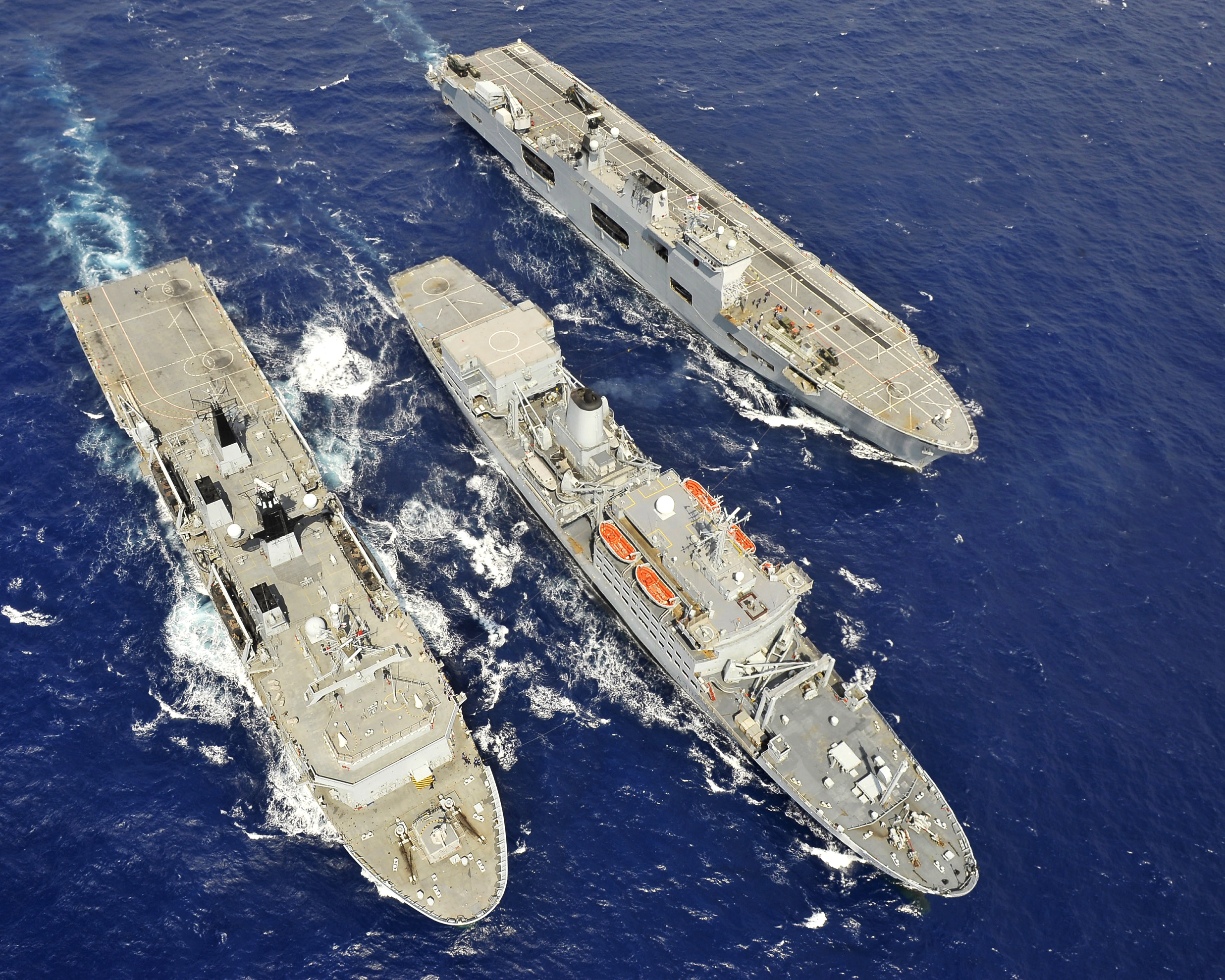
- HMS Albion (the then Fleet Flagship), RFA Fort Rosalie and HMS Ocean of the RFTG conducting replenishment at sea during Cougar 11
- Active: 2010–present
- Country: United Kingdom (under the Joint Expeditionary Force if required)
- Branch: Royal Navy
- Role: Expeditionary
- Part of: Joint Expeditionary Force

Commanders
- Current commander: Commander Littoral Strike Group

The Joint Expeditionary Force (Maritime) (or JEF(M)) (formerly the Response Force Task Group (RFTG), and prior to that the Joint Rapid Reaction Force (JRRF)), is the Royal Navy's contribution to the Joint Expeditionary Force (JEF) maintained at very high-readiness and available at short notice to respond to unexpected global events. In addition to the Royal Navy and the Royal Marines, the JEF(M) also includes elements of the British Army and the Royal Air Force. While it is primarily poised to conduct war-fighting or strike operations, the JEF(M) is capable of undertaking a diverse range of activities such as evacuation operations, disaster relief or humanitarian aid.

Under the name of RFTG, this high-readiness Maritime Task Group was established under the 2010 Strategic Defence and Security Review, and was initially focused on periodic deployments centered around amphibious shipping, initially termed Cougar deployments, but now named according to the focus of the main activity; although not mandated as an annual activity, these deployments tend to alternate between operating in North West Europe and the Mediterranean Sea, and deploying East of Suez to the Persian Gulf and the Indian Ocean. On these deployments, the Task Group regularly conducts exercises with allies and partners. As a Task Group, the RFTG was activated on operations during the 2011 Libyan Civil War, provided humanitarian aid during Typhoon Haiyan in 2013, and elements were activated to deploy to the Caribbean in 2020 under an augmented Atlantic Patrol Task (North) deployment.

As of late 2024, the U.K.'s capacity to make major contributions to JEF(M) was brought into question with the decision by the newly-elected Labour government to retire both of the Royal Navy's Albion-class landing platform dock vessels by March 2025. Simultaneously, the Royal Fleet Auxiliary was suffering severe crewing problems, as well as a labour force disruption, meaning the manning of its three Bay-class landing ship dock vessels was facing serious challenges. This brought into question the entire concept of the navy's ability to conduct even medium-sized amphibious operations.

== Command structure ==
The JEF(M) is usually commanded at sea by an officer the rank of Commodore, who can be either the Commander of the UK Littoral Strike Group (COMLSG, formerly named COMATG) or Commander of the UK Carrier Strike Group (COMCSG), depending on the focus of the deployment; the Command Platform will be either an Albion-class LPD or a Queen Elizabeth-class aircraft carrier. For a major deployment of the JEF(M) (acting as a Task Force, consisting of more than one Task Group), the formation will be commanded by Commander United Kingdom Strike Forces (COMUKSTRKFOR) who is responsible for directing "UK, Allied or Coalition maritime forces anywhere in the world".

In the RFTG era, Command of the Task Group was usually (but not exclusively) exercised by the Commander of the Amphibious Task Group (COMATG), renamed as Commander UK Task Group (COMUKTG) from 2011 to 2015. Since 2015, periodic deployments have continued this pattern, with all recent iterations being commanded by COMATG (now termed COMLSG), but since the introduction into Royal Navy service of the Queen Elizabeth-class aircraft carrier, it is likely that future deployments of the JEF(M) will be under the afloat Command of COMCSG.

=== Composition ===
The "scaleable nature" of the Joint Expeditionary Force (Maritime) means the Royal Navy has assigned a wide range of assets to the force, with its composition changing depending on the scenario and the range of ships available.

== Operational history ==
=== Cougar 11 deployment ===
In April 2011, the Response Force Task Group deployed for the first time since its announced establishment in October 2010. The deployment was "designed to demonstrate the versatile capabilities and high readiness" of the Response Force Task Group and engage with foreign allies in the Mediterranean Sea and East of Suez. On 9 May (en route to Cyprus), seven senior NCOs and the Officer Commanding the Support Troop from 6 Assault Squadron Royal Marines held a service of remembrance at the Souda Bay Commonwealth Grave site in Crete to commemorate the 70th anniversary of the bitter battle for the island. Cougar 11 saw, for the first time, British Army AgustaWestland Apache attack helicopters operating from the decks of a Royal Navy warship, HMS Ocean.

During the deployment the RFTG was involved in several multinational exercises: The first was 'Cypriot Lion' which included Royal Marines from 40 Commando, elements of 3 Commando Brigade HQ and a detachment from the Netherlands Marine Corps. The second major exercise was code-named 'Albanian Lion', a joint UK-Albanian military exercise and the first joint operation between the UK and the Albanian Armed Forces since Albania joined NATO in 2009. The third major exercise was code-named 'Operation Red Alligator', described as a "major maritime security and anti-piracy exercise", it took place in the Persian Gulf with the Armed Forces of Saudi Arabia.

With the ongoing Civil War in Libya, on the 3 June 2011, five ships of the Response Force Task Group were temporarily detached and deployed off the Libyan coast as part of Operation Ellamy. Ocean launched repeated Apache gunships strikes from her flight deck and worked alongside the French amphibious assault ship Tonnerre, which deployed her own Eurocopter Tiger attack helicopters. HMS Triumph (a nuclear-powered fleet submarine) fired her Tomahawk land-attack cruise missiles at Libyan air defence and command and control centres. Analysts believe that in total more than 15 cruise missiles were fired by the submarine during the operations.

Cougar 11 composition:

Ships	UK Air Elements	UK Land Elements	Foreign Units
HMS Albion (Flagship)	815 Naval Air Squadron (Lynx HMA.8)	3 Commando Brigade HQ	—
HMS Ocean	845 Naval Air Squadron (Sea King HC4)	40 Commando	—
HMS Liverpool	847 Naval Air Squadron (Lynx AH.7)	Royal Marines Armoured Support Group	—
HMS Sutherland	857 Naval Air Squadron (Sea King ASaC.7)	539 Assault Squadron RM	—
HMS Triumph	No. 656 Squadron AAC (Apache AH.1)	—	—
RFA Argus	—	—	—
RFA Mounts Bay	—	—	—
RFA Cardigan Bay	—	—	—
RFA Fort Victoria	—	—	—
RFA Fort Rosalie	—	—	—
RFA Wave Knight	—	—	—

=== Cougar 12 deployment ===
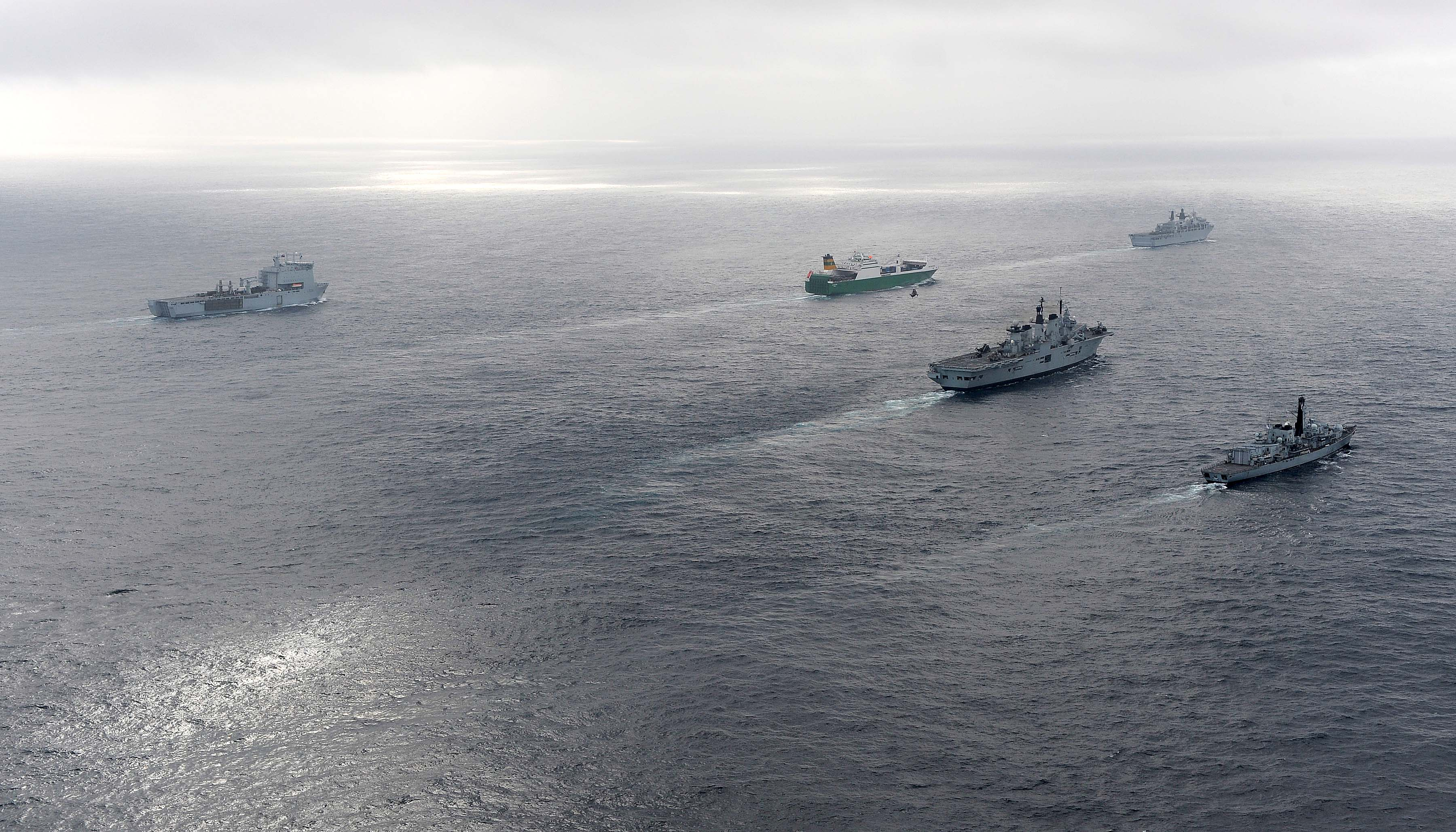
Response Force Task Group in the Mediterranean Sea during Cougar 12

Cougar 12 saw Response Force Task Group deploy six ships and more than 3,000 marines and sailors to the Mediterranean in early October 2012. One of the principle purposes of the deployment was to conduct large-scale amphibious exercises with participating allies. Key exercises included: 'Corsican Lion' with France; 'Albanian Lion' with Albania; a visit to Malta and exercises with the United States Navy and the Algerian Armed Forces.

Commander UK Task Group, Commodore Paddy McAlpine said: "Cougar 12 provides us with a superb opportunity to rekindle our amphibious capability after a prolonged period when our focus has been on operations elsewhere." Exercise 'Corsican Lion' was the main focus of Cougar 12 and was designed to towards developing the maritime and amphibious components of the Anglo-French Combined Joint Expeditionary Force (CJEF). The exercise involved the Response Force Task Group working directly alongside the French Navy's Task Force 473 and the French aircraft carrier Charles de Gaulle.

Head of the RFTG's amphibious operations, Brigadier Martin Smith of 3 Commando Brigade, Royal Marines, was quoted saying: "It is an incredibly versatile force and our burgeoning interoperability with the French further proves this. The quality of Royal Marines Commandos and French Marines delivers a highly effective first response capability which is optimised for early entry operations."

Cougar 12 composition:

Task Force Ships	UK Air Elements	UK Land Elements	Foreign Units
HMS Bulwark (Flagship)	814 Naval Air Squadron (Merlin HM.1)	3 Commando Brigade HQ	—
HMS Illustrious	815 Naval Air Squadron (Lynx HMA.8)	45 Commando	—
HMS Northumberland	829 Naval Air Squadron (Merlin HM.1)	30 Commando Information Exploitation Group	—
HMS Montrose	845 Naval Air Squadron (Sea King HC4)	539 Assault Squadron RM	—
RFA Mounts Bay	846 Naval Air Squadron (Sea King HC4)	17 Port and Maritime Regiment RLC	—
MV Hartland Point	854 Naval Air Squadron (Sea King ASaC.7)	—	—
—	No. 656 Squadron AAC (Apache AH.1)	—	—
—	No. 659 Squadron AAC (Lynx AH.7/9A)	—	—

=== Cougar 13 deployment ===
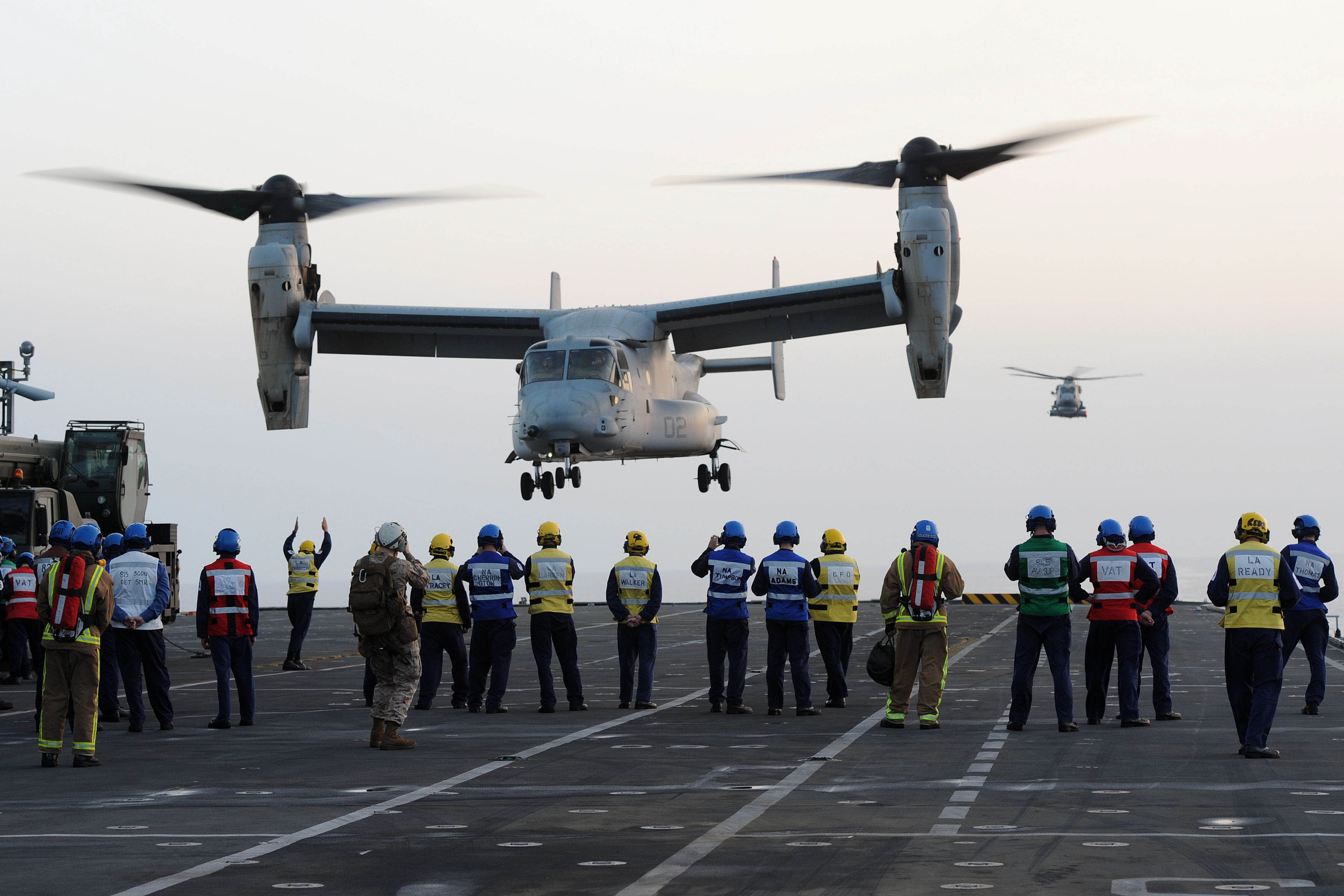
A USMC V-22 Osprey landing on the deck of HMS Illustrious

Cougar 13 deployed during the early autumn of 2013. In the Mediterranean, Response Force Task Group held exercises with the Portuguese Marine Corps and once again conducted exercise 'Albanian Lion' with the Albanian Armed Forces. Anti-surface exercises were also held with the Hellenic Navy and anti-submarine drills with the Italian Navy.

During mid September 2013, Response Force Task Group deployed East of Suez for the second phase of the Cougar 13 deployment where it linked up with the Royal Saudi Navy for exercise 'Red Alligator'. While East of Suez, a Bell-Boeing V-22 Osprey from USS Kearsarge landed on Illustrious in a joint exercise with the United States Navy. Likewise, Illustrious's Army Air Corps Westland Lynx and Westland Sea Kings dropped in on Kearsarge, carrying a few passengers to get a brief insight into the American LHD. In the Gulf of Oman, Response Force Task Group conducted anti-submarine drills against USS Dallas. HMS Quorn briefly met up with the RFTG for exercise 'Sea Khanjar'. Exercise 'Sea Khanjar' was observed by Fleet Commander Vice Admiral Philip Jones, Commandant General Royal Marines Major General Ed Davis, Lieutenant General Mike Hindmarsh and Commander United Arab Emirates Presidential Guard Marines, Colonel A Al-Tenaji.

When Typhoon Haiyan struck the Philippines in November 2013, HMS Illustrious was ordered to detach from the Response Force Task Group and assist in the disaster relief efforts. The mission was known as Operation Patwin, HMS Daring was already in the Far East when the tragedy struck and was swiftly able to provide humanitarian aid.

Cougar 13 composition:

Task Force Ships	UK Air Elements	UK Land Elements	Foreign Units
HMS Bulwark (Flagship)	814 Naval Air Squadron (Merlin HM.1)	3 Commando Brigade HQ	Somme
HMS Illustrious	(Royal Air Force)	42 Commando	—
HMS Montrose	815 Naval Air Squadron (Lynx HMA.8)	Royal Marines Armoured Support Group	—
HMS Westminster	845 Naval Air Squadron (Sea King HC4)	30 Commando Information Exploitation Group	—
RFA Lyme Bay	—	Commando Logistics Regiment	—
RFA Mounts Bay	—	29th Commando Regiment Royal Artillery	—
RFA Diligence	—	24 Commando Regiment Royal Engineers	—
RFA Fort Austin	—	17 Port and Maritime Regiment RLC	—
RFA Fort Victoria	—	—	—
MV Hurst Point	—	—	—

=== Cougar 14 deployment ===
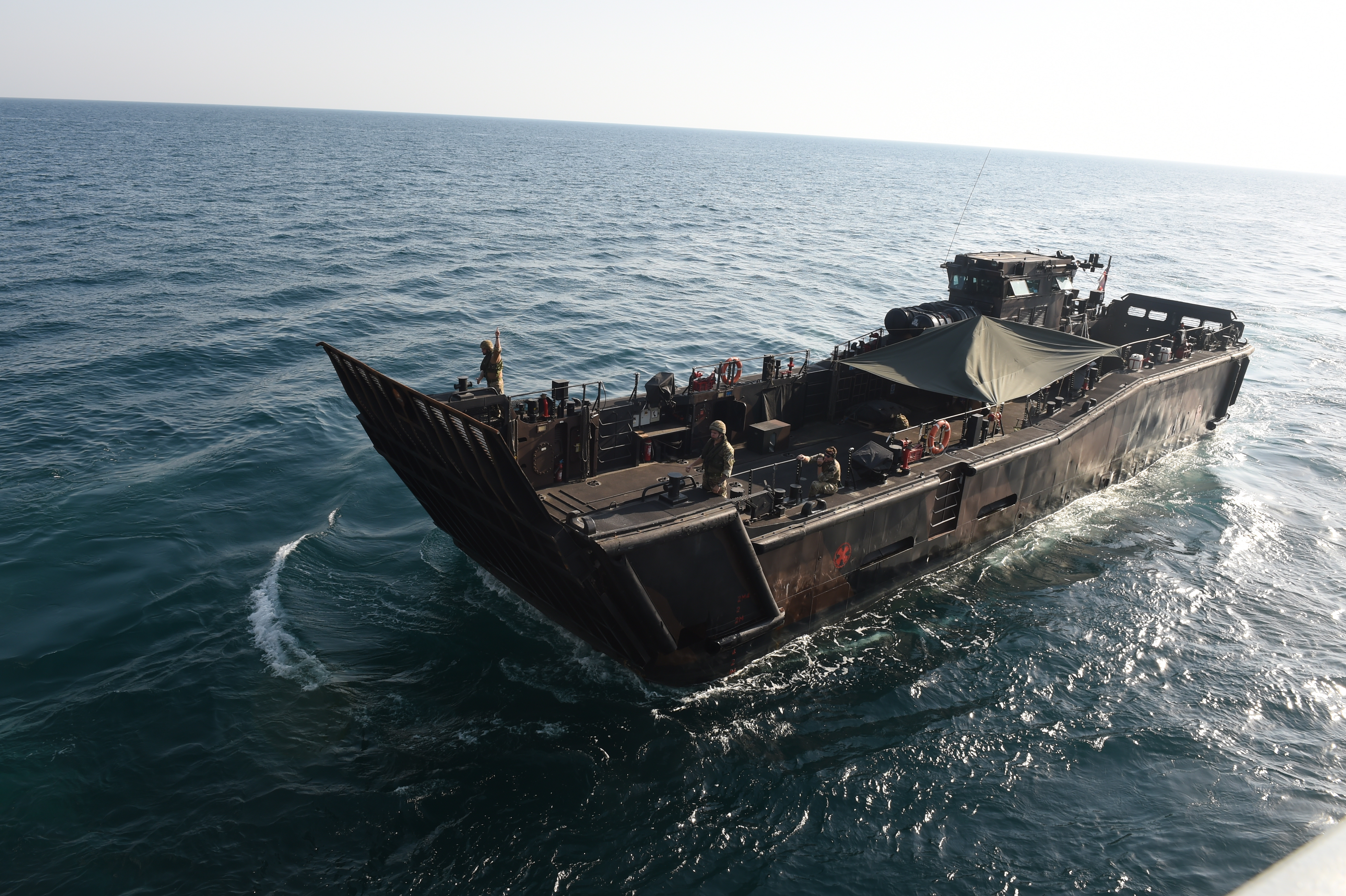
LCU Mk.10 approaching the dock of HMS Bulwark

The RFTG departed on Cougar 14 during early September 2014 for a four-month deployment scheduled to conduct exercises and engage with foreign navies in the Mediterranean and East of Suez in the (Persian) Gulf and Indian Ocean. Notable international warships that took the opportunity to rendezvous and participate with Cougar 14 were USS Makin Island, USS San Diego and the French ships Courbet and Dixmude.

The first phase of Cougar 14 was exercise Albanian Lion 2014, followed by exercise Dragon Hammer 2014, concluding by 17 October 2014. Several ships also broke off to participate in the middle-eastern IMCMEX exercise. Once completed, they regrouped with the Cougar 14 Task Group for further exercises in the region.

During December 2014 on the return journey to Britain, Bulwark and Lyme Bay conducted exercise Sea Snake, where Royal Marines from 40 Commando and 4 Assault Squadron 'stormed' the beaches of Gibraltar during amphibious landings.

Cougar 14 composition:

Task Force Ships	UK Air Elements	UK Land Elements	Foreign Units
HMS Bulwark (Flagship)	814 Naval Air Squadron (Merlin HM.1)	3 Commando Brigade HQ	Schleswig-Holstein
HMS Ocean	No. 27 Squadron RAF (Chinook HC4)	40 Commando	—
HMS Northumberland	847 Naval Air Squadron (Lynx Wildcat AH.1)	—	—
RFA Lyme Bay	—	—	—
RFA Fort Austin	—	—	—
RFA Wave Ruler	—	—	—

=== Cougar 15 deployment ===
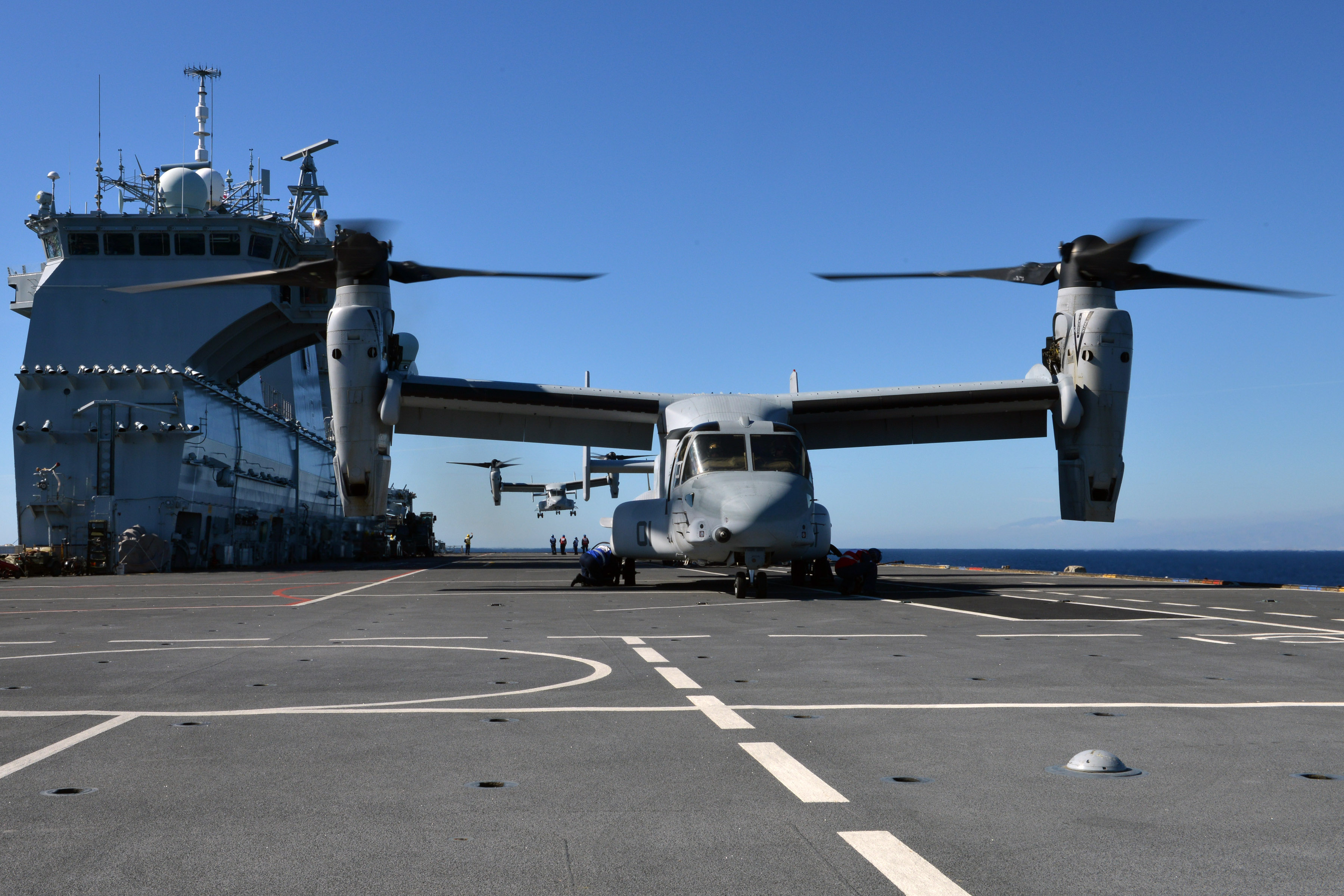
HMS Ocean with a USMC V-22 Osprey on her deck

Cougar 15 took place alongside the larger NATO wide exercise Trident Juncture 15. Trident Juncture is a key exercise for the Royal Navy, as the country will take command of NATO's Very High Readiness Task Force in 2016. Trident Juncture 15 consisted of over 36,000 personnel and 70 warships from several NATO and allied nations. The exercise saw both the COMUKMARFOR Rear Admiral Radkin and COMUKTG Commodore Connell deploy on HMS Ocean and HMS Bulwark respectively. Bulwark deployed with almost 100 extra Royal Marines from across 3 Commando Brigade, and over 100 specialist personnel required to command the Task Group and its activities.

One of the first exercises during Cougar 15 was Corsica Lion, where Bulwark, Ocean, MV Hartland Point and the French Navy's Dixmude practised rescuing "civilians" off the northern coast of Corsica. The RFTG also exercised with Standing NATO Maritime Group 2. As part of Cougar 15, United States Marine Corps MV-22 Ospreys flew off Ocean during Exercise Blue Raptor, transporting Royal Marines from ship to shore. This exercised ended around 24 November 2015. Bulwark temporarily remained in Malta along with HMS Somerset to provide security for the Commonwealth Heads of Government Meeting 2015. This security arrangement ended with Queen Elizabeth II visiting Bulwark and the ship returned to its home port on 7 December 2015.

Cougar 15 composition:

Task Force Ships	UK Air Elements	UK Land Elements	Foreign Units
HMS Ocean (2* Flagship)	814 Naval Air Squadron (Merlin HM.2)	3 Commando Brigade HQ	Dixmude
HMS Bulwark (1* Flagship)	847 Naval Air Squadron (Wildcat AH.1)	45 Commando	—
MV Hartland Point	No. 656 Squadron AAC (Apache AH.1)	—	—
—	No. 27 Squadron RAF (Chinook HC4)	—	—

=== Joint Expeditionary Force (Maritime) 16 ===
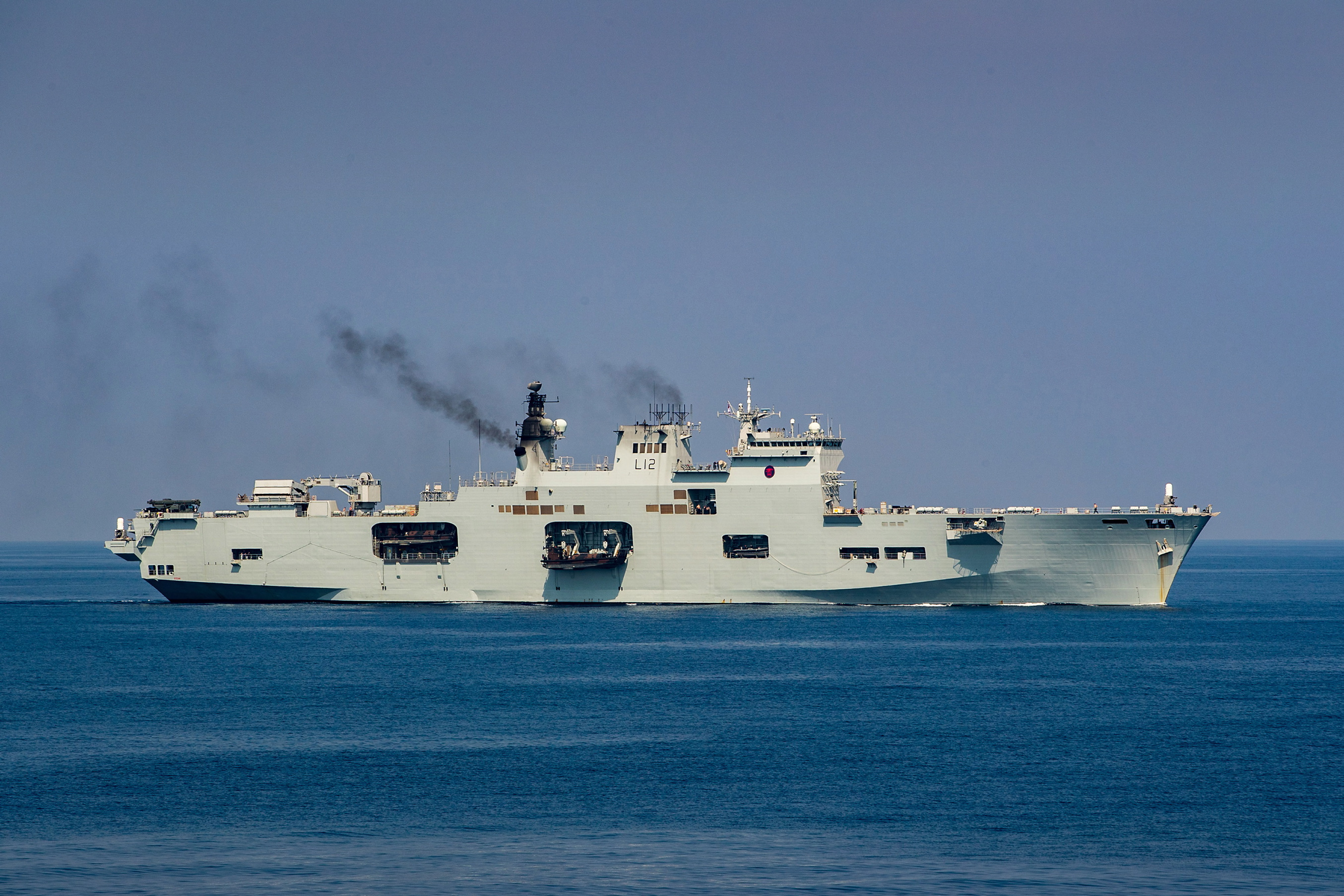
LPH HMS Ocean during the JEF(M) Amphibious Task Group in October 2016

In September 2016, HMS Bulwark (as flagship), HMS Ocean, embarked with helicopters from 845 Naval Air Squadron, No. 662 Squadron AAC and No. 27 Squadron RAF, and elements of 3 Commando Brigade HQ Royal Marines, RFA Mounts Bay and MV Eddystone Point, deployed on the Joint Expeditionary Force (Maritime) 2016. After exercising in the Mediterranean, the JEF(M) then sailed to the Red Sea and Persian Gulf, whereupon Commander Amphibious Task Group Commodore Andrew Burns shifted his broad pennant from HMS Bulwark to HMS Ocean so that he could assume command of the United States Fifth Fleet Task Force 50 until March 2017.

JEF (M) 16 composition:

Task Force Ships	UK Air Elements	UK Land Elements	Foreign Units
HMS Ocean (Flagship Dec 16 to Mar 17)	846 Naval Air Squadron (Merlin HC31)	3 Commando Brigade HQ	—
HMS Bulwark (Flagship Sep 16 to Dec 16)	No. 662 Squadron AAC (Apache)	42 Commando	—
RFA Mounts Bay	No. 27 Squadron RAF (Chinook)	539 Raiding Squadron RM	—
HMS Daring	820 Naval Air Squadron (Merlin HM.2)	—	—
MV Eddystone	815 Naval Air Squadron (Wildcat HMA.2)	—	—

=== Amphibious Task Group 18 (ATG18) deployment ===
In April 2018, it was announced that HMS Albion was being sent to the Far East to conduct UNSCR enforcement operations against North Korea, upon completion of which, the ship headed west to commence her participation in the Amphibious Task Group 18 (ATG18) deployment. With embarked battlestaff from COMLSG and HQ 3 Commando Brigade embarked, she rendezvoused with RFA Lyme Bay, RFA Cardigan Bay, and HMS Dragon, as well as elements from the Royal Navy of Oman, to conduct Exercise Saif Sareea 3 in October and November 2018.

ATG18 composition:

Task Force Ships	UK Air Elements	UK Land Elements	Foreign Units
HMS Albion (Flagship)	845 Naval Air Squadron (Merlin HC4)	3 Commando Brigade HQ	Royal Navy of Oman ships
HMS Dragon	815 Naval Air Squadron (Wildcat HMA.2)	40 Commando	—
RFA Lyme Bay	—	539 Raiding Squadron RM	—
RFA Cardigan Bay	—	—	—
HMS Ledbury	—	—	—
HMS Blyth	—	—	—
MV Anvil Point	—	—	—

=== BALTIC PROTECTOR 19 deployment ===
BALTIC PROTECTOR 19 composition:

UK Ships	UK Air Elements	UK Land Elements	Non-UK JEF Ships
HMS Albion (Flagship)	845 Naval Air Squadron (Merlin HC4)	3 Commando Brigade HQ	HDMS Absalon
HMS Kent	847 Naval Air Squadron (Lynx Wildcat AH.1)	539 Assault Squadron RM	HNLMS Johan de Witt
HMS Westminster	815 Naval Air Squadron (Lynx Wildcat HMA.2)	45 Commando	Skjold class
HMS Ramsey	—	—	—
RFA Lyme Bay	—	—	—
RFA Argus	—	—	—
RFA Wave Knight	—	—	—
MV Hurst Point	—	—	—

=== Baltic Sea deployment 2023 ===
On the 28th of November 2023, it was announced that JEF(M) would deploy to patrol the Baltic Sea. Sweden announced that it would participate with two Visby-class corvettes.

== See also ==
- Commander UK Strike Forces
- Commander Littoral Strike Group
- Joint Expeditionary Force
- Combined Joint Expeditionary Force
- Joint Rapid Reaction Force
