= Joint Rapid Reaction Force =

Former tri-service capability concept of the British Armed Forces (1999-2010)

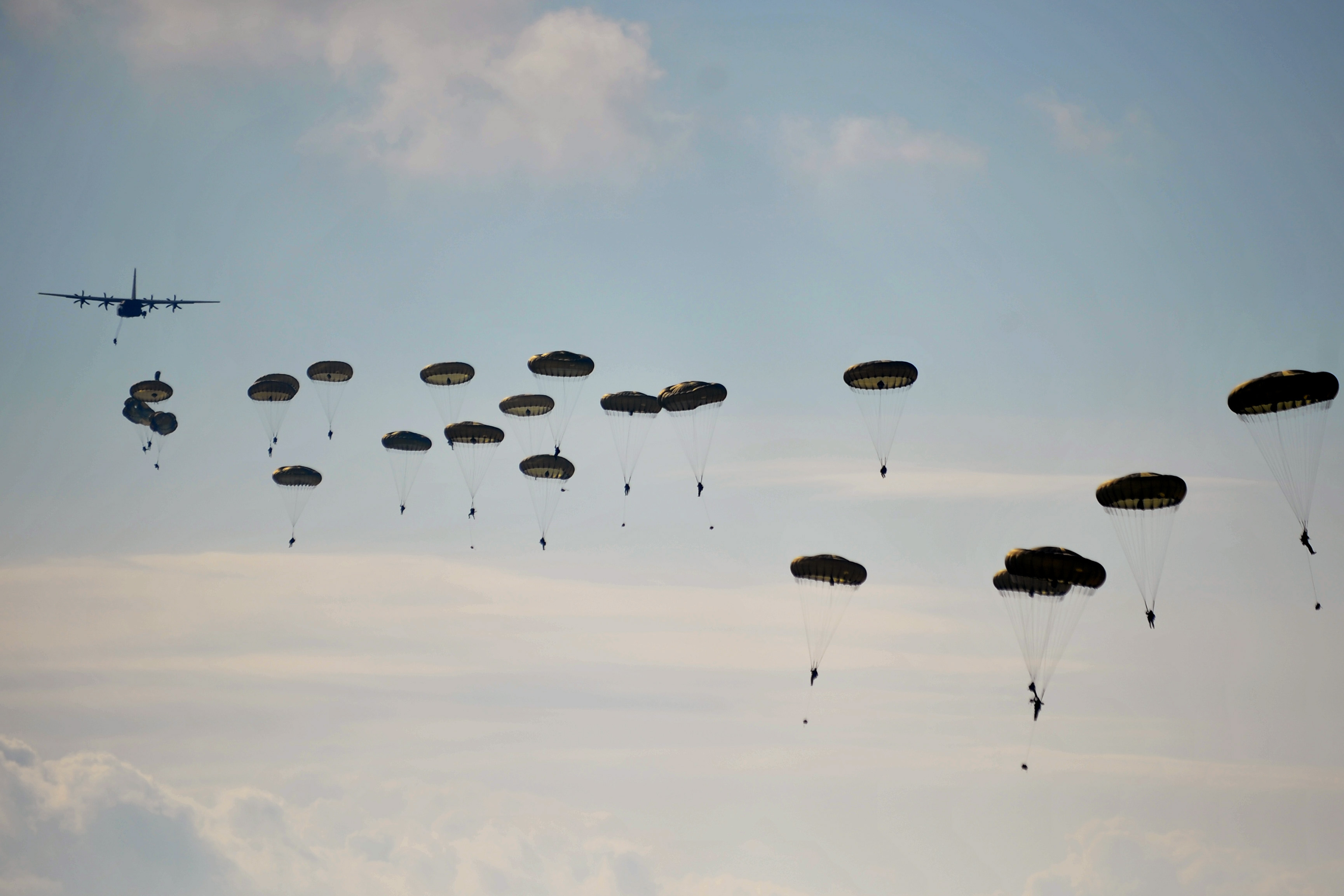
- 16 Air Assault Brigade, a key element of the JRRF
- Active: 1999–2010
- Country: United Kingdom
- Role: Rapid deployment force
- Part of: British Armed Forces (tri-service)
- Components: Royal Navy; Royal Marines; British Army; Royal Air Force

The Joint Rapid Reaction Force (JRRF) was a capability concept of the British Armed Forces from 1999 to 2010. It was a pool of specialised units from all three armed services tasked with rapid deployment worldwide at short notice. The force was intended to be capable of mounting operations up to medium scale warfighting. It could be employed nationally, or multinationally under the auspices of NATO, the United Nations or any other coalition.

The JRRF was an initiative in the 1998 Strategic Defence Review. An initial rapid reaction capability was declared in April 1999 and was fully operational in 2001. It was originally intended that JRRF would be able to mount up to two simultaneous operations of up to 15,000 personnel each. A major military exercise called Saif Sareea II was held in Oman in September 2001 to test the deployment of the JRRF.

In the event of the JRRF being activated, the force commander was the Chief of the Joint Rapid Reaction Force (CJRRFO) who was responsible to the Chief of Joint Operations (CJO) at the Permanent Joint Headquarters at Northwood. A Joint Task Force HQ (JTFHQ) would have accompanied the force to provide local command, which was maintained at 48 hours' notice to move. Until deployed, operational control of the various units was the responsibility of the single-service Commanders-in-Chief.

Because of the United Kingdom's simultaneous commitments to operations in the War in Afghanistan from 2001 and the 2003 invasion of Iraq, there were insufficient uncommitted forces to support the JRRF. In 2010, the Lancaster House Treaties gave rise to the Anglo-French Combined Joint Expeditionary Force (CJEF), which restored a rapid deployment capability, although there are no permanently assigned forces. In 2012, proposals were unveiled for the Joint Expeditionary Force, which can be deployed as an all-British force, or preferably in combination with other European allies.

== Forces ==
The Joint Rapid Reaction Force could be deployed in three phases. The first element was known as the Spearhead Forces that were kept at a high state of readiness. This was composed of:

- The Spearhead Land Element (SLE) of special forces (SAS or SBS), and either a light infantry battalion or a commando group.
- The Spearhead Naval Force (SNF) of two frigates or destroyers, an attack submarine and a support ship of the Royal Fleet Auxiliary.

Following that, if required, was the First Echelon, composed of

- A Maritime Task Group of major warships
- A Mine Countermeasures Group
- An Amphibious Task Group which could deploy:
- A Joint Landing Force drawn from either 3 Commando Brigade or 16 Air Assault Brigade.

In the final phase, a Second Echelon could be deployed, with further major naval units and ground forces from 1st (UK) Armoured Division and 3rd (UK) Mechanised Division.

All of these elements could be supported by helicopters, transport and combat aircraft as required.

== Deployments ==
Elements of the Joint Rapid Reaction Force were activated for the British military intervention in the Sierra Leone Civil War in May to September 2000. The Spearhead Land Element consisted of the standby special forces squadron and 1 PARA plus a single rifle company of 1st Battalion, Royal Irish Regiment, both part of 16 Air Assault Brigade. Also deployed was an air element provided by the Joint Helicopter Command, consisting of four RAF CH-47 Chinooks which flew direct to Sierra Leone from the UK. A Royal Navy Carrier Group led by HMS Illustrious and an Amphibious Task Group led by HMS Ocean were also deployed.

Elements of 16 Air Assault Brigade were deployed to the Republic of Macedonia as a spearhead for Operation Essential Harvest in August 2001, a NATO operation in support of a ceasefire ending the insurgency. The brigade also formed the United Kingdom's first response to the War in Afghanistan.

== See also ==
- Joint Expeditionary Force (Maritime)
- Joint Expeditionary Force
- Combined Joint Expeditionary Force
- Allied Rapid Reaction Corps
- Immediate Response Force
