= Joint Expeditionary Force =

UK-led Northern European multi-national rapid response and expeditionary force

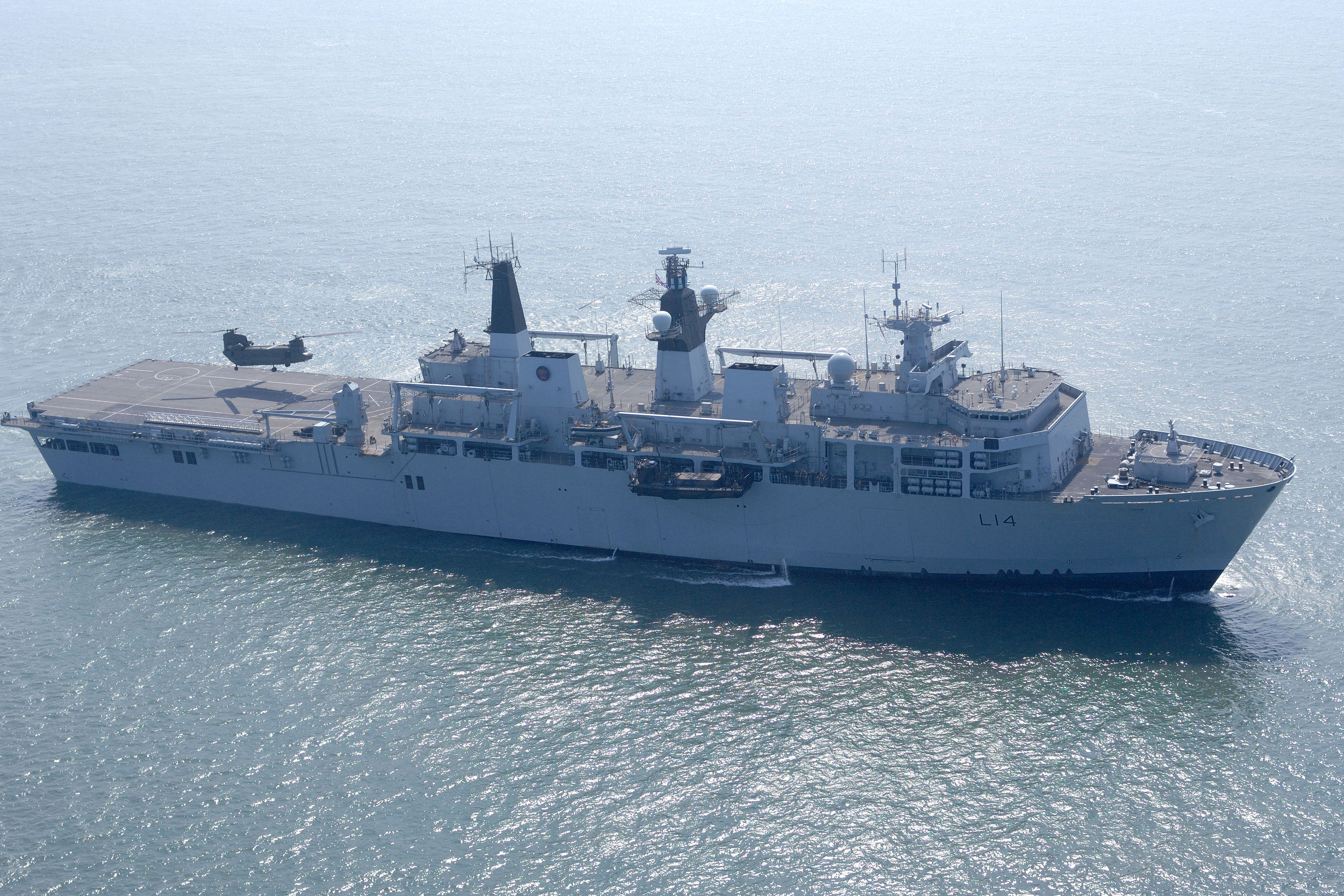
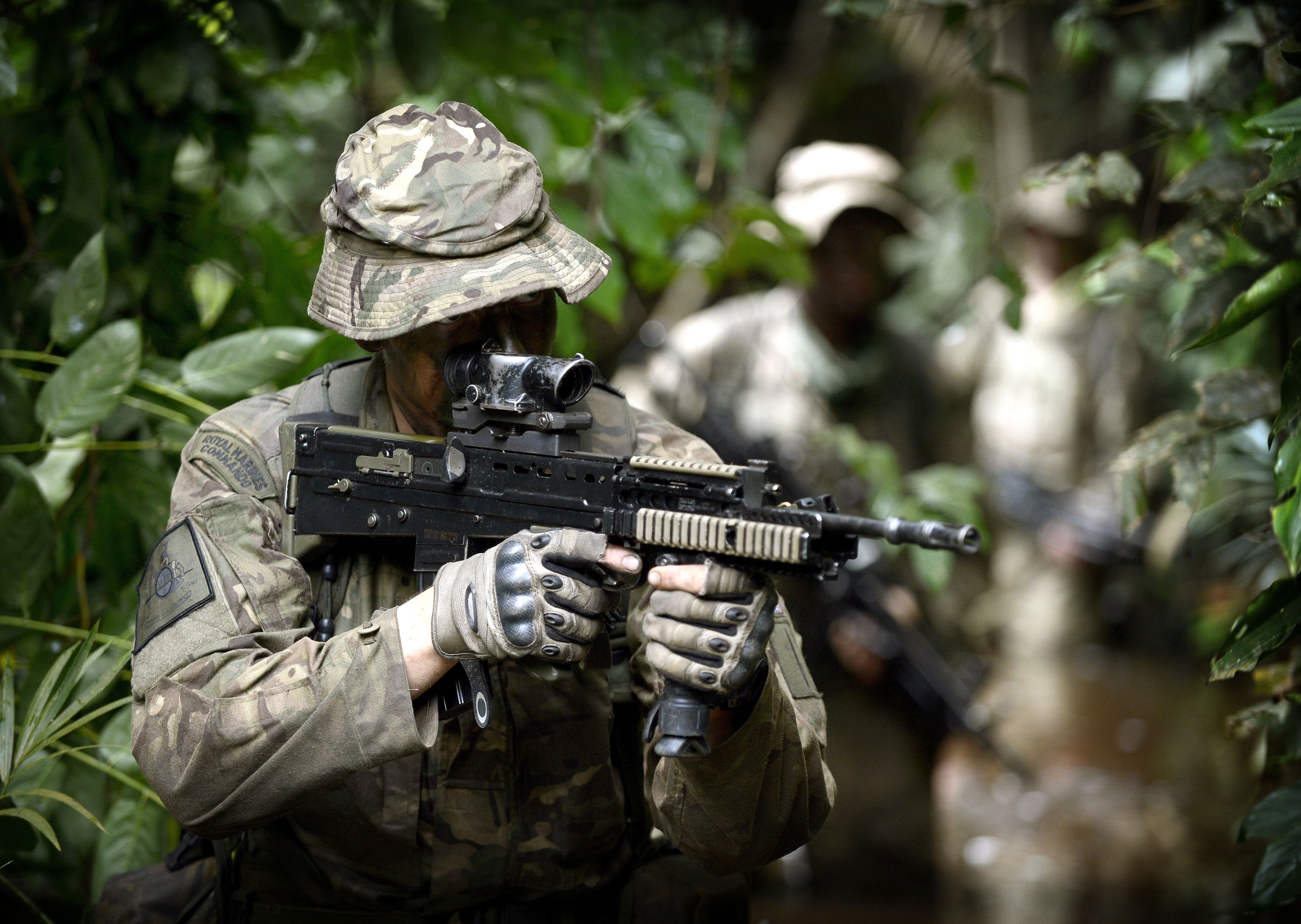
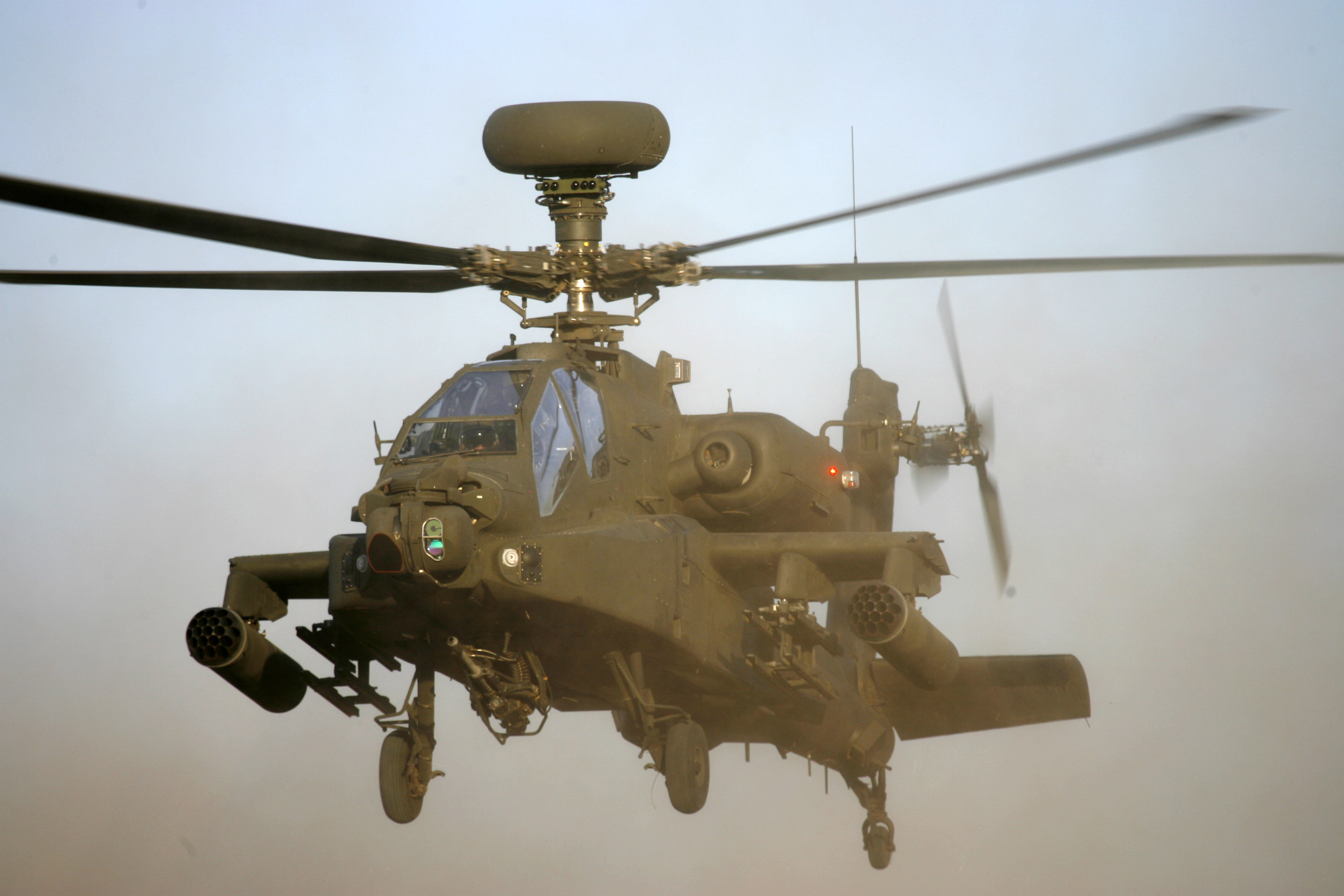
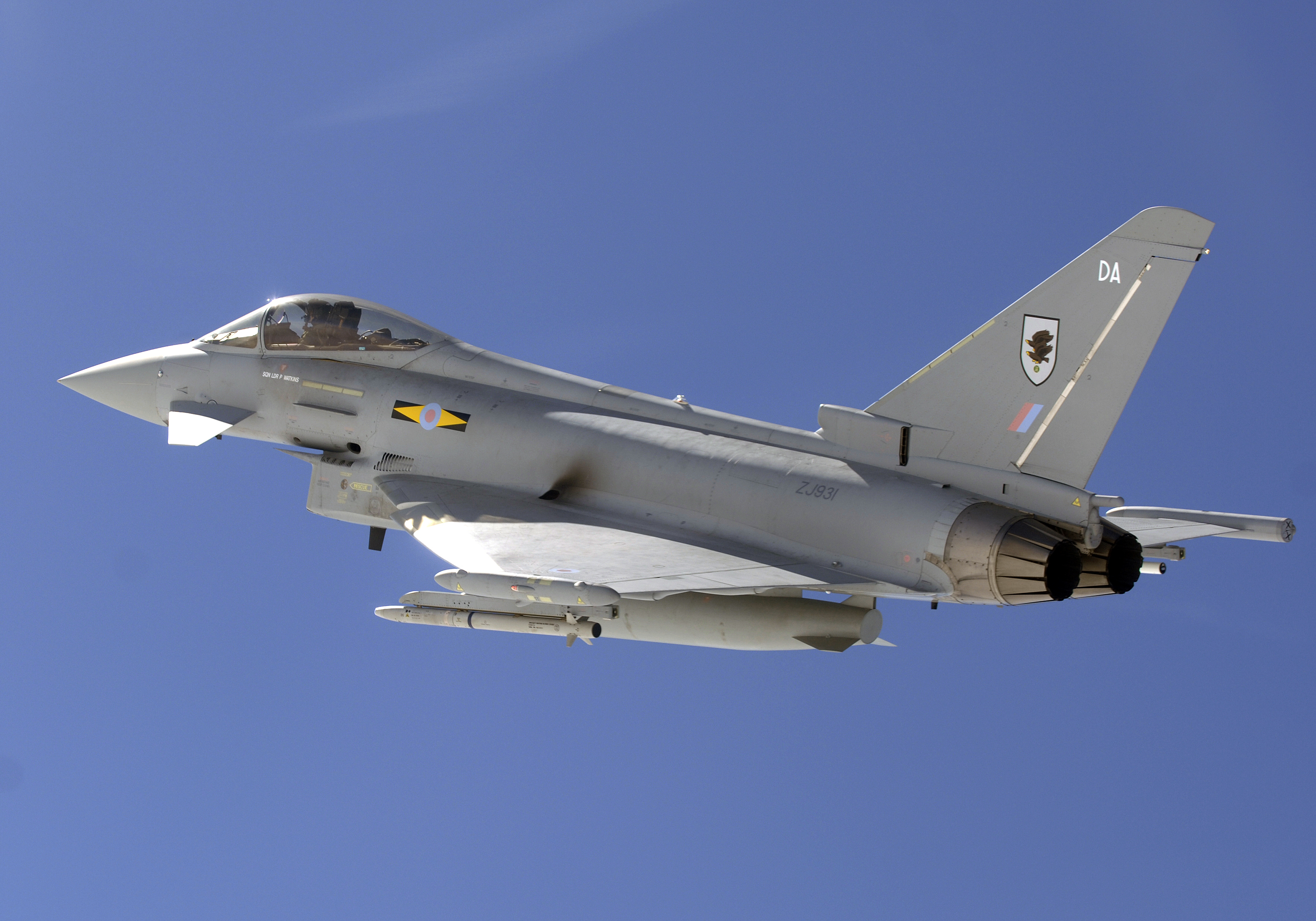
- The JEF consists of personnel and equipment from all branches of the armed forces
- Active: 2014–present
- Countries: United Kingdom (lead); Denmark; Estonia; Finland; Iceland; Latvia; Lithuania; Netherlands; Norway; Sweden
- Type: Expeditionary force
- Role: Military operations
- Size: 10,000 personnel
- Headquarters: Standing Joint Force Headquarters, Northwood HQ
- UK Components: Royal Navy; Royal Marines; British Army; Royal Air Force

Insignia
- Emblem

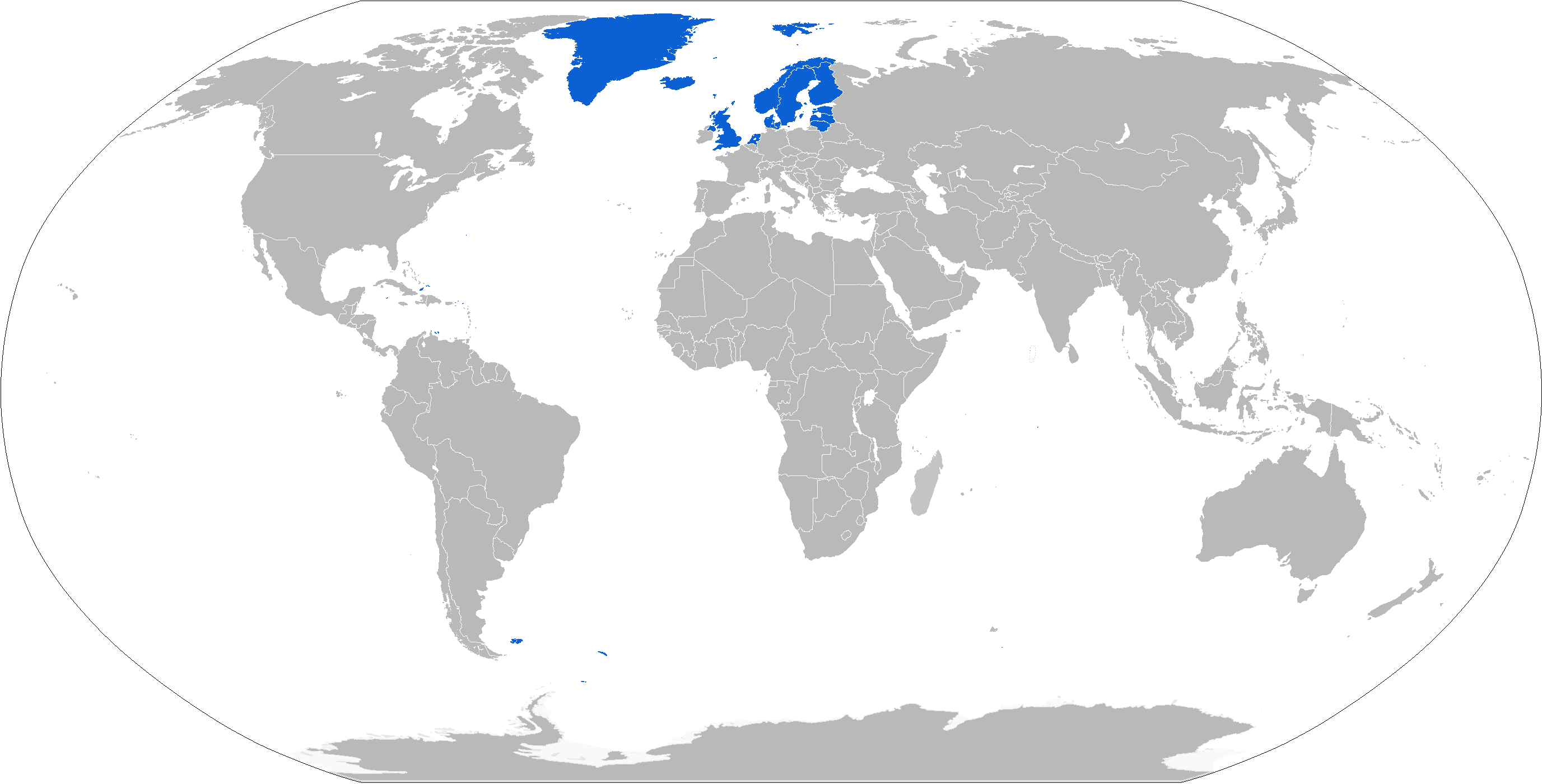
Map of the JEF member states

The Joint Expeditionary Force (JEF) is a United Kingdom-led Northern European multi-national military partnership designed for rapid response and expeditionary operations. It consists of the United Kingdom, the Nordic countries (Denmark, Finland, Iceland, Norway, Sweden), the Baltic states (Estonia, Latvia, Lithuania), and the Netherlands. The UK is the lead nation of the partnership, and operational command is led by the Standing Joint Force Headquarters based at Northwood Headquarters, Hertfordshire.

The JEF was established in 2014, and it has been fully operational since June 2018. It is not part of NATO, but all of its members are also NATO member states. It can act independently in its own right, but it can also be deployed in support of NATO or other cooperative ventures, for example as part of a United Nations peacekeeping force.

== History ==
=== Formation (2012–2018) ===
In 2012, the UK chief of the defence staff General Sir David Richards announced the JEF. It was initially conceived as a UK-only formation, a successor to the Joint Rapid Reaction Force (JRRF), which was established in 1999 but was disbanded due to insufficient resources as a result of the UK's focus on operations in Afghanistan and Iraq.

On 5 September 2014, the multinational JEF was officially launched with a letter of intent, signed by Denmark, Estonia, Latvia, Lithuania, the Netherlands and Norway, with the intent to be fully operational by 2018. It was launched as a NATO initiative at the September 2014 Wales Summit, subsumed under the new "Framework Nations Concept" rubric. Under the rubric, Germany, the UK and Italy were to act as 'framework nations' for groups of NATO allies working together for the joint development of forces and capabilities required by NATO. The UK element of the JEF consists of personnel and equipment from the Royal Navy, Royal Marines, British Army and Royal Air Force. It was designed to provide greater levels of integration than previously achieved, especially when combined with other countries' armed forces.

Sweden, which was not a NATO member state until 2023, did not sign the initial letter of intent. In early October 2015 Swedish Defence Minister Peter Hultqvist explained that, although he did not rule out Sweden joining the JEF, no formal process exists that would allow them to join JEF. He was summoned by the Riksdag, the Swedish parliament, to confirm whether the Swedish government was engaged in formal talks to join the JEF without the knowledge of the parliament.

On 30 November 2015, seven countries (UK, Denmark, Estonia, Latvia, Lithuania, Netherlands, and Norway) signed the contract to establish the JEF at Lancaster House in London.

On 22 June 2017 the Swedish government confirmed that Sweden would join the JEF. On 30 June 2017, Finland also joined the JEF.

On 28 June 2018, a comprehensive memorandum of understanding was signed amongst nine partner countries. On that date, capability existed to deploy over 10,000 personnel.

On 20 April 2021, Ben Wallace, the UK Secretary of State for Defence, and Sturla Sigurjónsson, the Icelandic Ambassador to the United Kingdom, signed a 'Note of Joining', leading Iceland to become the 10th member of the JEF.

=== Since Russian invasion of Ukraine ===
In February 2022, the foreign ministers of the 10 JEF countries announced military drills (ground, air and navy) in northern Europe.

In March 2022, Volodymyr Zelenskyy addressed a meeting of the heads of government of the JEF, where he said "everything will be directed against Europe if Ukraine does not survive. Therefore, I ask you: help yourself by helping us."

On 28 November 2023, it was announced that the UK's contribution to the JEF, the Joint Expeditionary Force (Maritime), would deploy to patrol the Baltic Sea. Sweden announced that it would participate with two Visby-class corvettes.

In March 2026, Canadian Prime Minister Mark Carney participated in a virtual meeting, followed by the formal application announcement in September.

In September 2026, Finnish media reported that UK offered its nuclear umbrella to the JEF members.

== Requirements ==
The aim of the JEF is to create a UK military framework for partners to join. It is developed around the UK's existing high readiness capabilities. At the signing of the JEF agreement, the UK Government stated its intention to fully integrate the JEF partners' contributions before 2018, but that the JEF would be able to deploy immediately if required.

In a 2012 speech, then–Chief of Defence Staff David Richards stated that the JEF is designed to:

1. act jointly and with allies, but able to act alone
2. be well equipped, but not tied to platforms
3. adapt as the environment changes

== Capabilities ==
The JEF is intended as a pool of high readiness, adaptable forces that is designed to enhance the UK's ability to respond rapidly, anywhere in the world, with like-minded allies, or on behalf of international organisations such as the UN or NATO. The UK's contribution will include the lead commando, airborne, armoured, aviation, air and maritime task groups.

Speaking before the Royal United Services Institute in 2012, CDS General Sir David Richards outlined the specific applications that the capabilities of the Joint Expeditionary Force will allow.

With the capability to 'punch' hard and not be a logistical or tactical drag on a coalition, we will be especially welcomed by our friends and feared by our enemies[...] JEF will be capable of projecting power with global effect and influence. Nowhere is more important to us than our friends in the Middle East and Gulf and in line with clear political intent we would expect, with other initiatives, for JEF elements to spend more time reassuring and deterring in that region.

— Sir David Richards, Defence Chief of Staff, (2012)

== International partners ==
Together with the British Armed Forces, the following nine states may form part of the JEF as required.

- Denmark – Danish Defence
- Estonia – Estonian Defence Forces
- Finland – Finnish Defence Forces
- Iceland – Icelandic Coast Guard
- Latvia – Latvian National Armed Forces
- Lithuania – Lithuanian Armed Forces
- Netherlands – Netherlands Armed Forces
- Norway – Norwegian Armed Forces
- Sweden – Swedish Armed Forces

== Summits ==
JEF Summits
#	Year	Dates	Country	City	Leaders	Ref.	Image
1	2022	25 February	United Kingdom	Virtual meeting (Video conference)	10: Mette Frederiksen; Kaja Kallas; Sauli Niinistö; Katrín Jakobsdóttir; Artis Pabriks; Gitanas Nausėda; Kajsa Ollongren; Jonas Gahr Støre; Magdalena Andersson; Boris Johnson		
2	2022	14–15 March	United Kingdom	London	10: Morten Bødskov; Kaja Kallas/Kalle Laanet; Sauli Niinistö; Katrín Jakobsdóttir; Krišjānis Kariņš; Gitanas Nausėda; Kajsa Ollongren; Odd Roger Enoksen; Magdalena Andersson; Boris Johnson		
3	2022	19 December	Latvia	Riga	10: Jakob Ellemann-Jensen; Kaja Kallas; Sauli Niinistö; Katrín Jakobsdóttir; Krišjānis Kariņš; Gitanas Nausėda; Kajsa Ollongren; Jonas Gahr Støre; Ulf Kristersson; Rishi Sunak		
4	2023	12–13 October	Sweden	Visby	10: Mette Frederiksen; Kaja Kallas; Sauli Niinistö; Þórdís Kolbrún R. Gylfadóttir; Evika Siliņa; Arvydas Anušauskas; Kajsa Ollongren; Jonas Gahr Støre; Ulf Kristersson; Rishi Sunak		
5	2024	16–17 December	Estonia	Tallinn	10: Mette Frederiksen; Kristen Michal; Alexander Stubb; Þórdís Kolbrún R. Gylfadóttir; Evika Siliņa; Gitanas Nausėda; Dick Schoof; Jonas Gahr Støre; Ulf Kristersson; Keir Starmer		
6	2025	8–9 May	Norway	Oslo	10: Mette Frederiksen; Kristen Michal; Alexander Stubb; Kristrún Frostadóttir; Evika Siliņa; Gitanas Nausėda; Dick Schoof; Jonas Gahr Støre; Ulf Kristersson; Keir Starmer		
7	2026	26 March	Finland	Helsinki	10: Anders Tang Friborg; Kristen Michal; Alexander Stubb; Kristrún Frostadóttir; Evika Siliņa; Gitanas Nausėda; Rob Jetten; Jonas Gahr Støre; Ulf Kristersson; Keir Starmer		
8	2027		Iceland	Reykjavík			

== See also ==
- Allied Rapid Reaction Corps – Rapid reaction force maintained by NATO
- Combined Joint Expeditionary Force – Joint UK–French multi-component expeditionary force
- Foreign relations of the United Kingdom
- Immediate Response Force – Rapid deployment force jointly maintained by the U.S. Army and U.S. Air Force
- Joint Expeditionary Force (Maritime) – Royal Navy's contribution to the UK-led Joint Expeditionary Force
- Joint Rapid Reaction Force – Former tri-service capability concept of the British Armed Forces (1999-2010)
- Northern Future Forum – International forum
