= Balkan Battlegroup =

EU Balkan Battlegroup HELBROC
- Coat of arms
- Active: 1 July 2007– present
- Country: Greece; Bulgaria; Cyprus; Romania; Ukraine (since 2011); Serbia (since 2016); North Macedonia (since 2021)
- Allegiance: European Union
- Branch: EU Battlegroup
- Type: Regiment

Country-members of the Balkan Battlegroup, HELBROC

The Balkan Battlegroup is an EU Battlegroup led by Greece. Originally referred to as HELBROC (an acronym of its first member States, namely HELlas, Bulgaria, ROmania, Cyprus), it consists of military units from Greece, Bulgaria, Romania, Cyprus, Ukraine, North Macedonia, and Serbia. During its third and fourth standby period in the second half of 2011 and 2014, the Balkan Battlegroup was joined by Ukraine. Serbia signed its participation in 2016 and North Macedonia signed its participation in 2021.

== History ==
The Balkan Battlegroup has been on standby in the following semesters:

- 1 July – 31 December 2007.
- 1 January – 30 June 2009.
- 1 July – 31 December 2011 (including Ukraine).
- 1 July – 31 December 2014 (including Ukraine).

It was expected to serve again in 2016, 2018 and 2020.

On 1 July 2011, Ukraine was part of the Balkan Battlegroup for the first time. It contributed 10 staff officers, a company of Ukrainian armored vehicles manned with marines, and an Ilyushin Il-76 strategic lift aircraft. Even with the War in Donbas going on since April 2014, Ukraine took part in the Battlegroup's standby period in the second half of 2014. The Riga Declaration of 22 May 2015 stated that the Eastern Partnership Summit's participants 'appreciate Ukraine's contribution to an EU Battlegroup in 2014 and its interest in continuing such contributions in the future'. Anders Åslund, Senior Fellow of the Atlantic Council, was highly critical of the "embarrassing" EU declaration, that did not explicitly condemn Russia's actions in Ukraine, and only summarily praised Ukraine's contribution to the EU Battlegroup, commenting that: "Ukraine offers the EU admittedly minor military support, while the EU does nothing for Ukraine."

On 8 November 2016, Serbia, an EU candidate state, signed an agreement to become part of the Battlegroup, bringing the number of member countries to six.

== Coat of arms ==
The coat of arms depicts a white pigeon carrying an olive branch to a burning globe on a blue field, surrounded by the 12 golden stars of the European emblem.

The olive branch and the pigeon are ancient symbols of peace and in combination with the burning globe reflect the urgent intervention of the HELBRROC BG, whenever may be required.

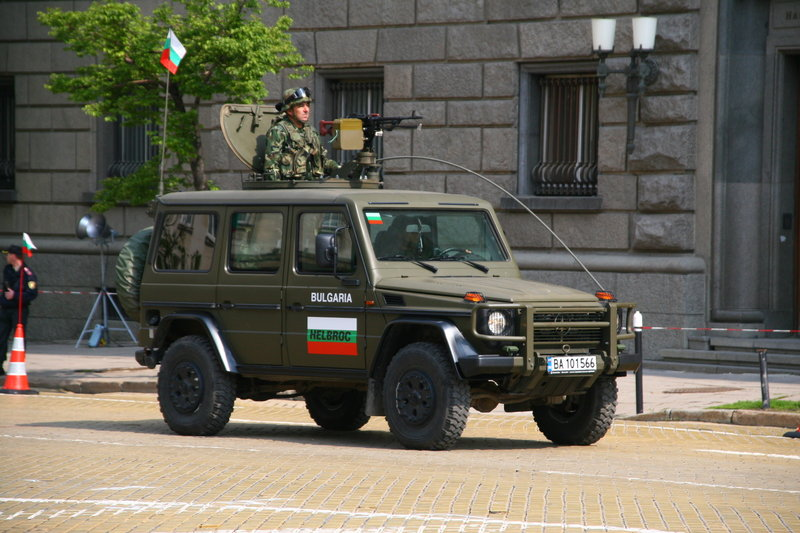
Bulgarian army G-class with HELBROC insignia

== Exercises ==
To complement HELBROC's operational training, two exercises were conducted in May 2007. The first was Command Post Exercise (CPX) EVROPI – I and the second was LIVe Exercise (LIVEX) EVROPI – II.

== See also ==
- Czech–Slovak Battlegroup
- Visegrád Battlegroup
- South-Eastern Europe Brigade
- NATO
