= British Battlegroup =

British Battlegroup UK Battlegroup
- Active: 1 January 2005 – 30 June 2005; 1 July 2008 – 31 December 2008
- Country: United Kingdom
- Allegiance: European Union
- Branch: EU Battlegroup
- Type: Rapid reaction force
- Size: 1,500
- Part of: European Union Military Staff
- Garrison/HQ: London, United Kingdom

Commanders
- Current commander: General lieutenant Nick Houghton

The British Battlegroup or UK Battlegroup is an EU Battlegroup, consisting entirely of British armed forces. It was on standby from 1 January, until 30 June 2005, and from 1 July, until 31 December 2008.

== Background ==
The United Kingdom, as part of the European Union, contributed part of its armed forces to the EU Battlegroup scheme. This scheme puts a battlegroup composed of elements from one or more EU member states at the disposal of the European Council to be deployed as required. As one of the larger EU members, the United Kingdom contributed to two individual battlegroups. The British Battlegroup is made up entirely of British forces, while the other, the UK–Dutch Battlegroup, has the UK as the "framework" (i.e. lead) nation in the formation, in conjunction with forces from the Netherlands. The Netherlands also contributes to Battlegroup 107, alongside Germany and Finland.

== Composition and equipment ==
The two UK-led battlegroups are formed from units declared to the UK's Joint Rapid Reaction Force, a rapid deployment element formed either from 3 Commando Brigade or 16 Air Assault Brigade, which are the elite commando and paratroop formations.
