= Weimar Battlegroup =

Weimar Battlegroup EU BG I/2013
- Weimarska Grupa Bojowa (Polish)
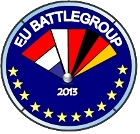
- Active: 1 January 2013 – 30 June 2013
- Country: Poland; France; Germany
- Allegiance: European Union
- Branch: EU Battlegroup
- Type: Rapid reaction force
- Size: 2,100
- Part of: European Union Military Staff
- Garrison/HQ: Warsaw, Międzyrzecz

The Weimar Battlegroup (Polish: Weimarska Grupa Bojowa; abbreviation: EU BG I/2013) is a multinational EU Battlegroup under Polish leadership, in which Germany and France also participate as members of the Weimar Triangle. It was on standby in the first half of 2013.

== History ==
In 2004, the EU Member States' Defence Ministers approved the creation of 13 battlegroups, which have been fully operational since 2007. In 2006, the Defence Ministers of France, Germany and Poland agreed on the need for the establishment of the Weimar Battlegroup. Negotiations on the structure, the contribution of states and functions of the Group began in January 2009 and ended on 5 July 2011 with the signing of an agreement by representatives of the Weimar Triangle countries to NATO and the EU. According to the agreement:

- Poland will be the framework nation, and will therefore issue: Operations Command, Forces Command, and the manoeuvre battalion;
- Germany is leading logistics and security;
- France is the leading country in the field of medical protection;
- The Battlegroup will be on duty in the first half of 2013.

== Composition and equipment ==
The core of the Weimar Battlegroup numbered approximately 2,100 soldiers, or motorized infantry battalion to Rosomak issues 17 Mechanized Brigade. Brigade and other units that provided troops to the Weimar Battlegroup, began a series of training exercises, which ended on 23 November 2012 with the official certification of the entire Battlegroup during exercise Common Challenge-12.

The manoeuvre battalion consists of:

- 4 manoeuvre companies
- Command company, including the team of snipers and reconnaissance section of contamination
- Logistics company, including medical evacuation team
- Support company
- Fire support group
- Anti-aircraft platoon
- Reconnaissance platoon

The group was able to undertake combat operations within 15 days (the first 5 days will be to decide on the use of force and planning of the operation, a further 10 for deployment in the mandate area), after which it could commence a mission lasting from one to four months, in line with Chapters VI and VII of the Charter of the United Nations (additionally, it could interact with the forces of the UN and NATO, should this become such an eventuality). However, as with the previous battlegroups, the European Union decided not to use it.
