= Spanish–Italian Amphibious Battlegroup =

Spanish-Italian Amphibious Battlegroup
- Active: 23 November 1998
- Country: Italy; Spain; Portugal; Greece
- Allegiance: European Union
- Branch: EU Battlegroup
- Type: Marines
- Size: Regiment (1500)
- Part of: Common Security and Defence Policy
- Garrison/HQ: HQ: Brindisi, Italy; Rota, Spain

The Spanish–Italian Amphibious Battlegroup is one of 18 European Union battlegroups. It is formed by the Spanish–Italian Landing Force (SILF) of the Spanish–Italian Amphibious Force (SIAF Spanish: Fuerza Anfibia Hispano-Italiana; Italian: Forza Anfibia Italo-Spagnola). It consists of 1500 Marines with manpower contributed from the participating countries. From January until June 2009, it was on the EU Battlegroup standby roster.

== Order of battle ==
The unit uses a modular organization.

=== SILF ===
The primary core of the unit is made up by:

- the Italian San Marco Marine Brigade.
- the Spanish Brigada de Infantería de Marina (BRIMAR of the Spanish Marines)

=== SIAF ===
It also has attached units from the Italian and Spanish Navies:

- Aircraft Carriers:
  - Cavour
- LHA
  - L-61 Juan Carlos I
  - LHD Trieste
- Landing Ships:
  - L-51 Galicia
  - L-52 Castilla
  - L-9892 San Giorgio
  - L-9893 San Marco
  - L-9894 San Giusto
