= Multinational Land Force =

Multinational Land Force (MLF) Italian–Hungarian–Slovenian Battlegroup
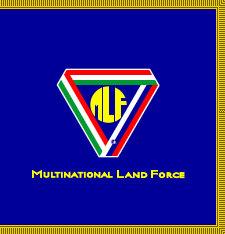
- Active: 1 June 2007 – 31 December 2007; 1 June 2012 – 31 December 2012
- Country: Italy; Hungary; Slovenia
- Branch: EU Battlegroup
- Type: Rapid reaction force
- Size: 1,500

The Multinational Land Force (MLF), also known as the Italian–Hungarian–Slovenian Battlegroup was an EU Battlegroup led by Italy, in which Hungary and Slovenia also participate.

The MLF originated in the late 1990s, when Italian Prime Minister Romano Prodi took the initiative to form a Trilateral Brigade with Slovenia and Hungary. The Italian Alpine Brigade Julia formed the core of the new battlegroup, and also provided its headquarters in Udine; the Slovenian 10th Motorized Battalion and the 1st Light Infantry Battalion (Hungary), Hungarian Ground Forces moved in with them on 5 September 2001. On 10 January 2002, the MLF was formally established, after which training exercises began.
