= Weimar Triangle =

Intergovernmental organization of France, Germany, and Poland

Weimar Triangle: Triangle de Weimar (French); Weimarer Dreieck (German); Trójkąt Weimarski (Polish)
- Weimar Triangle members Other member states of the European Union
- Official languages: French; German; Polish
- Membership: France; Germany; Poland
- Establishment: 28–29 August 1991

Area
  - Total: 1,314,075 km^{2} (507,367 sq mi)

Population
  - 2022 estimate: ▲190,349,334
- GDP (PPP): 2023 estimate
  - Total: ▲$11.1 trillion
- GDP (nominal): 2023 estimate
  - Total: ▲$7.9 trillion

The Weimar Triangle (French: Triangle de Weimar; German: Weimarer Dreieck; Polish: Trójkąt Weimarski) is a regional alliance of France, Germany, and Poland created in 1991 in the German city of Weimar. The group is intended to promote co-operation between the three countries in cross-border and European issues.

It exists mostly in the form of summit meetings between the leaders of the three countries, and of their foreign ministers. The collaboration between member states includes inter-parliamentary contacts and military, scientific, and cultural cooperation.

== History ==
=== 1990s ===
The Weimar Triangle was established in the German city of Weimar in 1991, aimed at assisting Poland's emergence from Communist rule. Attending the meeting were the Foreign Ministers of each state: Roland Dumas of France, Hans-Dietrich Genscher of Germany, and Krzysztof Skubiszewski of Poland. Genscher chose Weimar for the inaugural meeting because it was situated in former East Germany.

At the 1992 meeting of the Weimar Triangle in France, Poland won agreement from Germany and France that it should have special association status at the Western European Union, the European arm of NATO.

=== 2000s ===
Apart from regular meetings of ministers of foreign affairs and occasional summits of the countries' leaders, no major changes or decisions were made in the first decade of the twenty-first century in the Weimar Triangle.

=== 2010s ===
At the 2011 summit hosted by President Bronisław Komorowski of Poland and attended by President Nicolas Sarkozy (France) and Chancellor Angela Merkel (Germany), the three leaders discussed issues of renewing regular Weimar Triangle meetings and improving relations with Russia (among other topics). Both Germany and France urged Poland to join the Pact for Competitiveness.

On 5 July 2011, France, Germany, and Poland signed an agreement in Brussels to put together a unit of 1,700 soldiers under Polish command, called the Weimar Battlegroup, that was to be ready to deploy in crisis zones starting in 2013. The operational command centre was to be based in Mont Valerien, located in a Paris suburb.

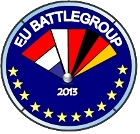
Emblem of the Weimar Battlegroup

Shortly after the referendum on the status of Crimea held on 16 March 2014, the chairpersons of the Weimar Triangle parliament's committees on foreign affairs – Elisabeth Guigou of France, Norbert Röttgen of Germany and Grzegorz Schetyna of Poland – visited Kyiv to express their countries’ firm support of the territorial integrity and the European integration of Ukraine. This was the first time that parliamentarians of the Weimar Triangle had ever made a joint trip to a third country.

In April 2016, Poland's foreign minister Witold Waszczykowski told daily newspaper Gazeta Wyborcza that the Weimar Triangle had lost its relevance for his country.

On 28 August 2016, representatives of the three countries vowed to "reinvigorate" the Weimar Triangle. German foreign minister Frank-Walter Steinmeier said the group would meet before the end of 2016, and French foreign minister Jean-Marc Ayrault said France would host a summit in November 2016. The stated reasoning for this reinvigoration were the decision of the United Kingdom to leave the European Union, as well as the ongoing European migrant crisis.

=== 2020s ===
On 8 February 2022, Presidents Emmanuel Macron, Andrzej Duda and Chancellor Olaf Scholz met in Berlin to discuss security cooperation in the face of the ongoing Russo-Ukrainian crisis. This was the first such trilateral meeting between the three heads of state or government in many years, and was seen as a step towards strengthening the Weimar Triangle format. At the meeting, Duda appealed for unity among European leaders saying that "We must show that we speak in one voice". Scholz stressed that any violation of Ukraine's sovereignty and territorial integrity was "unacceptable" and would have "far-reaching consequences for Russia in political, economic and geo-strategic dimensions" while President Macron reinforced France's determination to use diplomatic efforts which he said were "the only path to end the conflict around Ukraine." On 24 February the full-scale Russian invasion of Ukraine began.

On 12 June 2023, the leaders of the Weimar Triangle, Scholz, Macron and Duda met at the group's summit held in Paris to discuss a number of foreign policy issues the most important of which was the Russian invasion of Ukraine. The leaders reaffirmed their "unwavering support" for Ukraine and declared to assist the country in its defence efforts against Russia’s aggression politically, with humanitarian aid, financially and also by supplying arms. Among the topics discussed was also Ukraine’s future membership in the European Union and the NATO alliance.

On 27 June 2023, the German Minister of Finance Christian Lindner convened the first meeting of the finance ministers since 2017. The invasion of Ukraine was the reason for the revived interest in this format. Lindner, Bruno Le Maire and Magdalena Rzeczkowska discussed the union of their capital markets.

As the Fall of Avdiivka culminated, at the meeting of Weimar Triangle heads in Berlin on 12 February 2024 Polish Prime Minister Donald Tusk hinted that his country might join the European Sky Shield Initiative project headed by Germany, notable especially in the wake of comments on the future of NATO by American presidential candidate Donald Trump. The foreign ministers, who also met that day in La Celle-Saint-Cloud, called amongst other things for a "Weimar of citizens", a "Weimar of youth", a "Weimar of excellence" and a "Weimar of culture".

On 15 March 2024, a summit of Weimar Triangle was held in Berlin with Macron, Scholz and Tusk in attendance. The leaders stressed that they remained united over their stance on Europe's response to Russia's war in Ukraine. The leaders also announced a "capacity coalition" to provide long-distance artillery to Ukraine would be established, while declaring to "never prompt escalation" there. Chancellor Scholz stated that the three countries wanted to make sure that Ukraine could be capable of defending itself against Russia's invasion. Other journalists were keen to quote Scholz as having said at the "hastily arranged summit" that a "coalition for long-range rocket artillery" was then formed and that "starting immediately, we will procure even more weapons for Ukraine, on the overall world market." Another journalist was surprised that the leaders did not take questions from the press.

On 7 November 2024, the leaders of the Weimar Triangle issued a joint statement expressing concern over the 2024 Georgian parliamentary election calling for "swift and transparent investigations of all complaints and reports of election-related irregularities" and the reversal of the Russian-inspired legislation. On 31 December 2024, the Weimar Triangle foreign ministers made another statement about the overall political crisis, adding their concern about "violence against peaceful protesters, media and opposition leaders" and "[t]he political course of repression and democratic backsliding by the Georgian Dream" and stating that they were "determin[ed] to support the democratic and European aspirations of the Georgian people".

On 29 September 2025, the foreign ministers of France, Germany and Poland met at the Belweder Palace in Warsaw together with Ukraine's foreign minister. They discussed European security and support for Ukraine, condemned Russian incursions into EU member states' airspace, and called for stronger European defence capabilities and continued political, military and financial assistance to Ukraine.

== Formations (government) ==
=== Ministers of Foreign Affairs ===
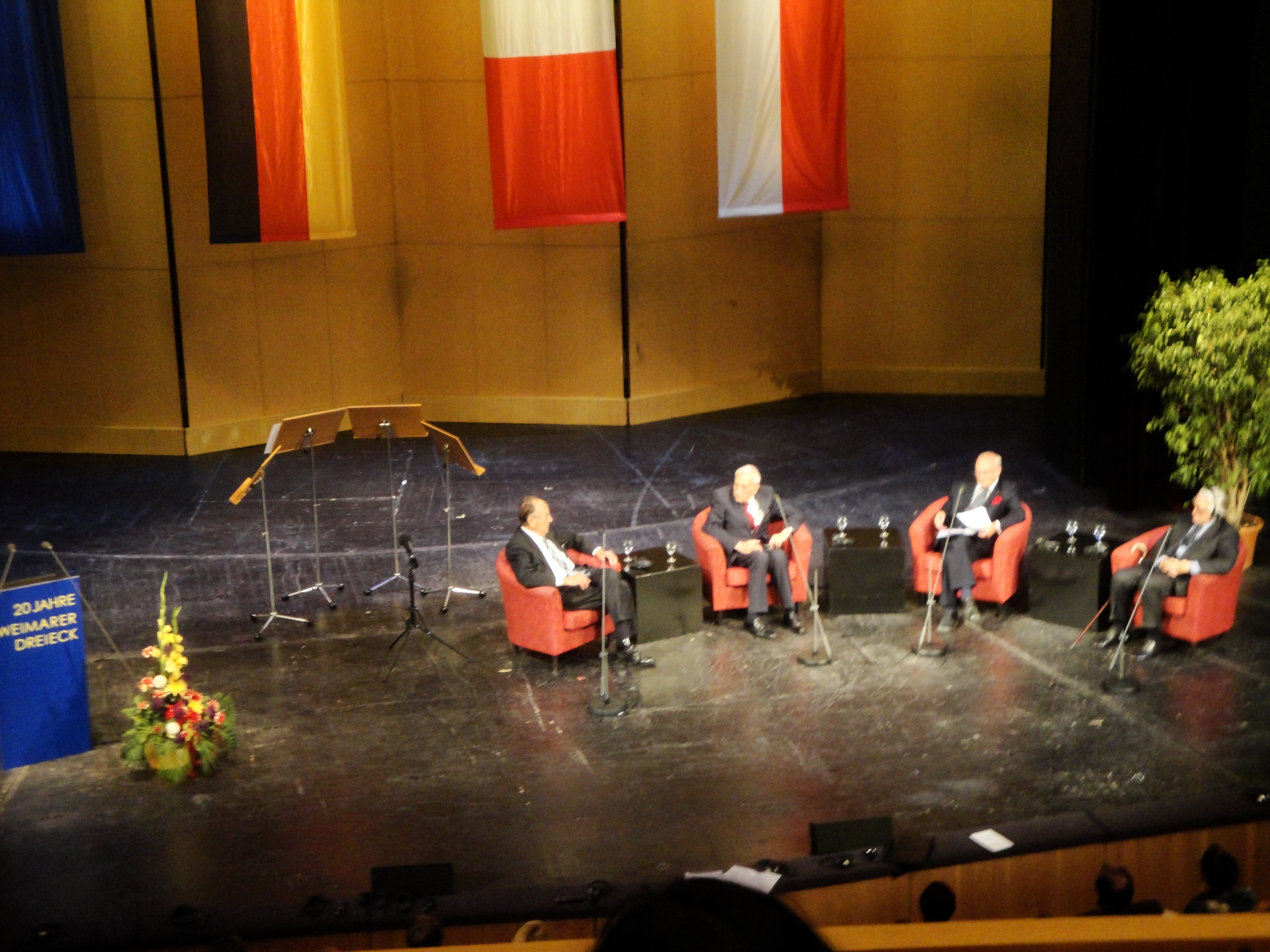
Twentieth anniversary of the Weimar Triangle, stage conversation between Hans-Dietrich Genscher (Germany), Tadeusz Mazowiecki (Poland), Klaus-Heinrich Standke (moderator) and Roland Dumas (France) in Weimar on 29 August 2011

1. 28–29 August 1991 in Weimar, Germany: Hans-Dietrich Genscher, Roland Dumas, Krzysztof Skubiszewski
2. 23–24 April 1992 in Bergerac, France: Hans-Dietrich Genscher, Roland Dumas, Krzysztof Skubiszewski
3. 11–12 November 1993 in Warsaw, Poland: Klaus Kinkel, Alain Juppé, Andrzej Olechowski
4. 14–15 September 1994 in Bamberg, Germany: Klaus Kinkel, Alain Juppé, Andrzej Olechowski
5. 26 October 1995 in Paris, France: Klaus Kinkel, Hervé de Charette, Władysław Bartoszewski
6. 19 December 1996 in Warsaw, Poland: Klaus Kinkel, Hervé de Charette, Dariusz Rosati
7. 19 November 1997 in Frankfurt/Oder, Germany: Klaus Kinkel, Hubert Védrine, Dariusz Rosati
8. 6 January 1999 in Paris, France: Joschka Fischer, Hubert Védrine, Bronisław Geremek
9. 30 August 1999 in Weimar, Germany: Joschka Fischer, Hubert Védrine, Bronisław Geremek
10. 7 June 2000 in Kraków, Poland: Joschka Fischer, Hubert Védrine, Bronisław Geremek
11. 23 April 2002 in Paris, France: Joschka Fischer, Hubert Védrine, Włodzimierz Cimoszewicz
12. 16 January 2004 in Berlin, Germany: Joschka Fischer, Dominique de Villepin, Włodzimierz Cimoszewicz
13. 27 June 2005 in Warsaw, Poland: Joschka Fischer, Philippe Douste-Blazy, Adam Daniel Rotfeld
14. 17 June 2008 in Paris, France: Frank-Walter Steinmeier, Bernard Kouchner, Radoslaw Sikorski
15. 26–27 April 2010 in Bonn, Germany: Guido Westerwelle, Bernard Kouchner, Radoslaw Sikorski (with Kostyantyn Gryshchenko from Ukraine as guest)
16. 23 June 2010 in Paris, France: Guido Westerwelle, Bernard Kouchner, Radoslaw Sikorski (with Sergey Lavrov from Russia as guest)
17. 20 May 2011 in Bydgoszcz, Poland: Guido Westerwelle, Alain Juppé, Radoslaw Sikorski
18. 29 February 2012 in Berlin, Germany: Guido Westerwelle, Alain Juppé, Radoslaw Sikorski
19. 20 February 2014 in Kyiv, Ukraine: Frank-Walter Steinmeier, Laurent Fabius, Radoslaw Sikorski
20. 31 March-1 April 2014 in Berlin and Weimar, Germany: Frank-Walter Steinmeier, Laurent Fabius, Radoslaw Sikorski
21. 24 October 2014 in La Celle-Saint-Cloud, France: Frank-Walter Steinmeier, Laurent Fabius and Grzegorz Schetyna
22. 3 April 2015 in Wrocław, Poland: Frank-Walter Steinmeier, Laurent Fabius and Grzegorz Schetyna
23. 28–29 August 2016 in Weimar and Berlin, Germany: Frank-Walter Steinmeier, Jean-Marc Ayrault, Witold Waszczykowski
24. 15 October 2020 in Paris, France: Heiko Maas, Jean-Yves Le Drian, Zbigniew Rau
25. 10 September 2021 in Weimar, Germany: Heiko Maas, Jean-Yves Le Drian, Zbigniew Rau
26. 1 March 2022 in Łódź, Poland: Annalena Baerbock, Jean-Yves Le Drian, Zbigniew Rau
27. 12 February 2024 in La Celle-Saint-Cloud, France: Annalena Baerbock, Stéphane Séjourné, Radosław Sikorski
28. 8 May 2025 in Warsaw, Poland: Johann Wadephul, Jean-Noël Barrot, Radosław Sikorski
29. 29 September 2025 in Warsaw, Poland: Johann Wadephul, Jean-Noël Barrot, Radosław Sikorski
30. 7 January 2026 in Paris, France: Johann Wadephul, Jean-Noël Barrot, Radosław Sikorski (with Subrahmanyam Jaishankar of India as guest)
31. 3 September 2026 in Weimar, Germany: Johann Wadephul, Jean-Noël Barrot, Radosław Sikorski

=== Heads of state and government ===
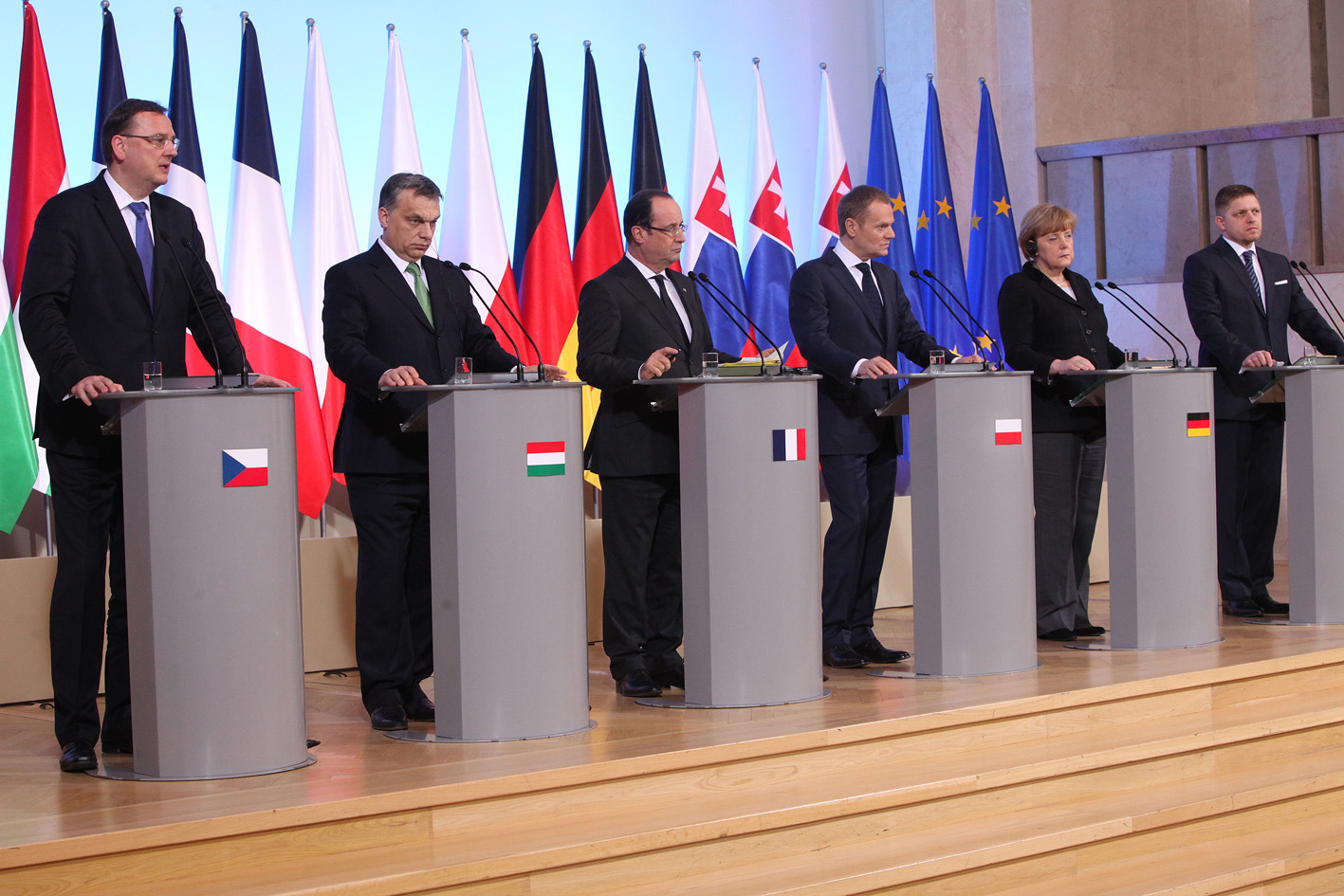
Meeting of leaders of Weimar Triangle and Visegrád Group in Warsaw, 2013

1. 21 September 1993 in Gdańsk, Poland: Richard von Weizsäcker, François Mitterrand, Lech Wałęsa
2. 21 February 1998 in Poznań, Poland: Helmut Kohl, Jacques Chirac, Aleksander Kwaśniewski
3. 7 May 1999 in Nancy, France: Gerhard Schröder, Jacques Chirac, Aleksander Kwaśniewski
4. 27 February 2001 in Hambach, Germany: Gerhard Schröder, Jacques Chirac, Aleksander Kwaśniewski
5. 9 May 2003 in Wrocław, Poland (held a few days before the referendum on the entry of Poland in the European Union): Gerhard Schröder, Jacques Chirac, Aleksander Kwaśniewski
6. 19 May 2005 in Nancy, France: Gerhard Schröder, Jacques Chirac, Aleksander Kwaśniewski
7. 5 December 2006 in Mettlach, Germany: Angela Merkel, Jacques Chirac, Lech Kaczynski
8. 7 February 2011 in Warsaw, Poland: Angela Merkel, Nicolas Sarkozy, Bronisław Komorowski
9. 6 March 2013 in Warsaw, Poland: Angela Merkel, François Hollande, Donald Tusk (jointly with leaders of the Visegrád Group)
10. 8 February 2022 in Berlin, German: Olaf Scholz, Emmanuel Macron, Andrzej Duda
11. 12 June 2023 in Paris, France: Olaf Scholz, Emmanuel Macron, Andrzej Duda
12. 15 March 2024 in Berlin, Germany: Olaf Scholz, Emmanuel Macron, Donald Tusk
13. 28 August 2025 in Chișinău, Moldova: Friedrich Merz, Emmanuel Macron, Donald Tusk (with Maia Sandu of Moldova as host)

A planned Summit on 3 July 2006 in Weimar, Germany was postponed due to the alleged indisposition of the Polish president Lech Kaczyński.

=== Ministers of European Affairs ===
1. 26 May 2003 in Warsaw, Poland: Hans Martin Bury, Noëlle Lenoir, Danuta Hübner
2. 22 October 2004 in Warsaw, Poland: Hans Martin Bury, Claudie Haigneré, Jarosław Pietras
3. 7 November 2008 in Paris, France: Günter Gloser, Pierre Lellouche, Mikołaj Dowgielewicz
4. 1 February 2010 in Warsaw, Poland: Werner Hoyer, Jean-Pierre Jouyet, Mikołaj Dowgielewicz
5. 22 September 2011 in Berlin, Germany: Werner Hoyer, Jean Leonetti, Mikołaj Dowgielewicz
6. 16 March 2012 in Antibes, France: Michael Georg Link, Jean Leonetti, Mikołaj Dowgielewicz
7. 1 October 2012 in Warsaw, Poland: Michael Georg Link, Thierry Repentin, Piotr Serafin
8. 16 July 2013 in Bad Wimpfen, Germany: Michael Georg Link, Bernard Cazeneuve, Piotr Serafin
9. 10 July 2014 in Warsaw, Poland: Michael Roth, Harlem Désir, Piotr Serafin
10. 26 September 2014 in Herleshausen, Germany: Michael Roth, Harlem Désir, Rafał Trzaskowski
11. 30 September 2015 in Paris, France: Michael Roth, Harlem Désir, Rafał Trzaskowski
12. 14 June 2016 in Warsaw, Poland: Michael Roth, Harlem Désir, Konrad Szymański
13. 21 January 2020 in Lens, Pas-de-Calais, France: Michael Roth, Amélie de Montchalin, Konrad Szymański
14. 15–16 September 2022 in Eberbach, Germant: Anna Lührmann, Laurence Boone, Konrad Szymański
15. 11 May 2023 in Poznań, Poland: Anna Lührmann, Laurence Boone, Szymon Szynkowski vel Sęk
16. 17–18 July 2023 in Skopje, North Macedonia: Anna Lührmann, Laurence Boone, Szymon Szynkowski vel Sęk
17. 29 April 2024 in Paris, France: Anna Lührmann, Jean-Noël Barrot, Adam Szłapka
18. 12–13 December 2024 in Genshagen, Germany: Anna Lührmann, Benjamin Haddad, Adam Szłapka

=== Ministers of Defence ===
1. 12 February 1999 in Kraków, Poland: Rudolf Scharping, Alain Richard, Janusz Onyszkiewicz
2. 29 September 2004 in Heiligendamm, Germany: Peter Struck, Michèle Alliot-Marie, Jerzy Szmajdziński
3. 25 July 2006 in Wieliczka, Poland: Franz Josef Jung, Michèle Alliot-Marie, Radoslaw Sikorski
4. 31 March 2015 in Berlin, Germany: Ursula von der Leyen, Jean-Yves Le Drian, Tomasz Siemoniak
5. 24 June 2024 in Paris, France: Boris Pistorius, Sébastien Lecornu, Władysław Kosiniak-Kamysz

=== Ministers of Finance ===
1. 18 July 2003 in Berlin, Germany: Hans Eichel, Francis Mer, Andrzej Raczko
2. 6 July 2015 in Warsaw, Poland: Wolfgang Schäuble, Michel Sapin, Mateusz Szczurek
3. 19 January 2016 in Berlin, Germany: Wolfgang Schäuble, Michel Sapin, Paweł Szałamacha
4. 22 February 2017 in Paris, France: Wolfgang Schäuble, Michel Sapin, Mateusz Morawiecki
5. 28 June 2023 in Weimar, Germany: Christian Lindner, Bruno Le Maire, Magdalena Rzeczkowska
6. 12 December 2024 in Warsaw, Poland: Jörg Kukies, Antoine Armand, Andrzej Domański

=== Ministers of Internal Affairs ===
1. 24 July 2013 in Kraków, Poland: Hans-Peter Friedrich, Manuel Valls, Bartłomiej Sienkiewicz

=== Ministers of the Environment ===
1. 15 July 2013 in Warsaw, Poland: Peter Altmaier, Philippe Martin, Marcin Korolec
2. 26 February 2014 in Berlin, Germany: Barbara Hendricks, Philippe Martin, Maciej Grabowski
3. 9 March 2026 in Gniezno, Poland: Carsten Schneider, Monique Barbut, Paulina Hennig-Kloska

=== Ministers for Economic Affairs ===
1. 7 February 2014 in Kraków, Poland: Sigmar Gabriel, Arnaud Montebourg, Janusz Piechociński
2. 4 July 2019 in Poznań, Poland: Peter Altmaier, Bruno Le Maire, Jadwiga Emilewicz
3. 5 May 2021 in Paris, France: Peter Altmaier, Bruno Le Maire, Jarosław Gowin

=== Ministers of Agriculture ===
1. 2 September 2014 in Bonn, Germany: Christian Schmidt, Stéphane Le Foll, Marek Sawicki
2. 31 August 2015 in Berlin, Germany: Christian Schmidt, Stéphane Le Foll, Marek Sawicki
3. 7 October 2019 in Warsaw, Poland: Julia Klöckner, Didier Guillaume, Jan Krzysztof Ardanowski

=== Ministers of Transport ===
1. 17 February 2026 in Warsaw, Poland: Patrick Schnieder, Philippe Tabarot, Dariusz Klimczak

== Formations (parliament) ==
=== Committees on Foreign Affairs ===
1. 19–20 March 2007 in Berlin, Germany: Ruprecht Polenz, Édouard Balladur, Paweł Zalewski
2. 28 September 2016 in Berlin, Germany: Norbert Röttgen, Élisabeth Guigou, Grzegorz Schetyna

=== Speakers of Parliament ===
1. 29 May 2010 in Essen, Germany: Norbert Lammert, Bernard Accoyer, Bronisław Komorowski
2. 5 July 2013 in Kraków, Poland: Norbert Lammert, Claude Bartolone, Ewa Kopacz
3. 16 June 2016 in Paris, France: Norbert Lammert, Claude Bartolone, Marek Kuchciński
4. 9 October 2026 in Warsaw, Poland: Julia Klöckner, Yaël Braun-Pivet, Włodzimierz Czarzasty (with Ruslan Stefanchuk of Ukraine as guest)

=== Committees on Defence ===
1. 9 June 2011 in Berlin, Germany: Susanne Kastner, Guy Teissier, Stanisław Wziątek

=== Committees on European Affairs ===
1. 14 November 2012 in Paris, France: Gunther Krichbaum, Danielle Auroi
2. 2013 in Gdańsk, Poland: Gunther Krichbaum, Danielle Auroi
3. 13–14 November 2014 in Berlin, Germany: Gunther Krichbaum, Danielle Auroi
4. 2016 in France: Gunther Krichbaum, Danielle Auroi
5. 2018 in Poland: Gunther Krichbaum, Sabine Thillaye
6. 13 May 2019 in Berlin, Germany: Gunther Krichbaum, Sabine Thillaye, Piotr Apel
7. 10–11 March 2024 in Warsaw, Poland: Anton Hofreiter, Pieyre-Alexandre Anglade, Agnieszka Pomaska
8. 24–25 November 2024 in Berlin, Germany: Anton Hofreiter, Pieyre-Alexandre Anglade, Agnieszka Pomaska

== See also ==
- Weimar+
- Visegrád Group
- Benelux
- Lublin Triangle
