= EUBG 2014 II =

EUBG 2014 II EUBG 2014-2
- Active: 1 July 2014 – 31 December 2014
- Country: Belgium; Germany; Netherlands; Luxembourg; Spain; North Macedonia
- Allegiance: European Union
- Branch: EU Battlegroup
- Size: Estimates vary: 2,500; 3,000; 3,500; 3,700.

Commanders
- Current commander: Colonel Philippe Boucké

EUBG 2014 II or EUBG 2014-2 is an EU Battlegroup consisting of around 3,000 troops from Belgium, Germany, Luxembourg, Spain, the Netherlands and North Macedonia. It was on standby from 1 July until 31 December 2014.

== Composition and equipment ==
EUBG 2014 II included approximately 745 Dutch soldiers:

- 14 CV90s with 220 infantry troops;
- 14 Bushmasters with 180 Airmobile Brigade troops;
- 2 Helicopter detachments (Chinooks) with 180 troops;
- 65 members of staff for the Belgian Force Headquarters and Infantry Task Force;
- 100 National Support Element detachment (logistics and field medics).

Belgium provided most troops: 1,800 soldiers. It formed a binational Infantry Task Force with the Netherlands, consisting of 4 infantry combat units. The 2 Dutch units were one heavy infantry company and one air-assault company; the 2 Belgian units were one light infantry company on Dingo 2s and a company of Piranha IIICs with DF90 (Direct Fire capability 90mm cannon). The Belgian helicopter group consisted of 6 Agusta 109s.

Germany provided CH-53 “Stallion” transport helicopters.

Spain provided field artillery (155mm cannon), a Signal Intelligence (SIGINT) unit and an air-defence platoon. There was also a team of Belgian and Spanish engineers, and psy ops capabilities.

Luxembourg provided a reconnaissance company.

North Macedonia was an exceptional participant, as the country was, at the time neither an EU nor NATO member.

== Exercises ==
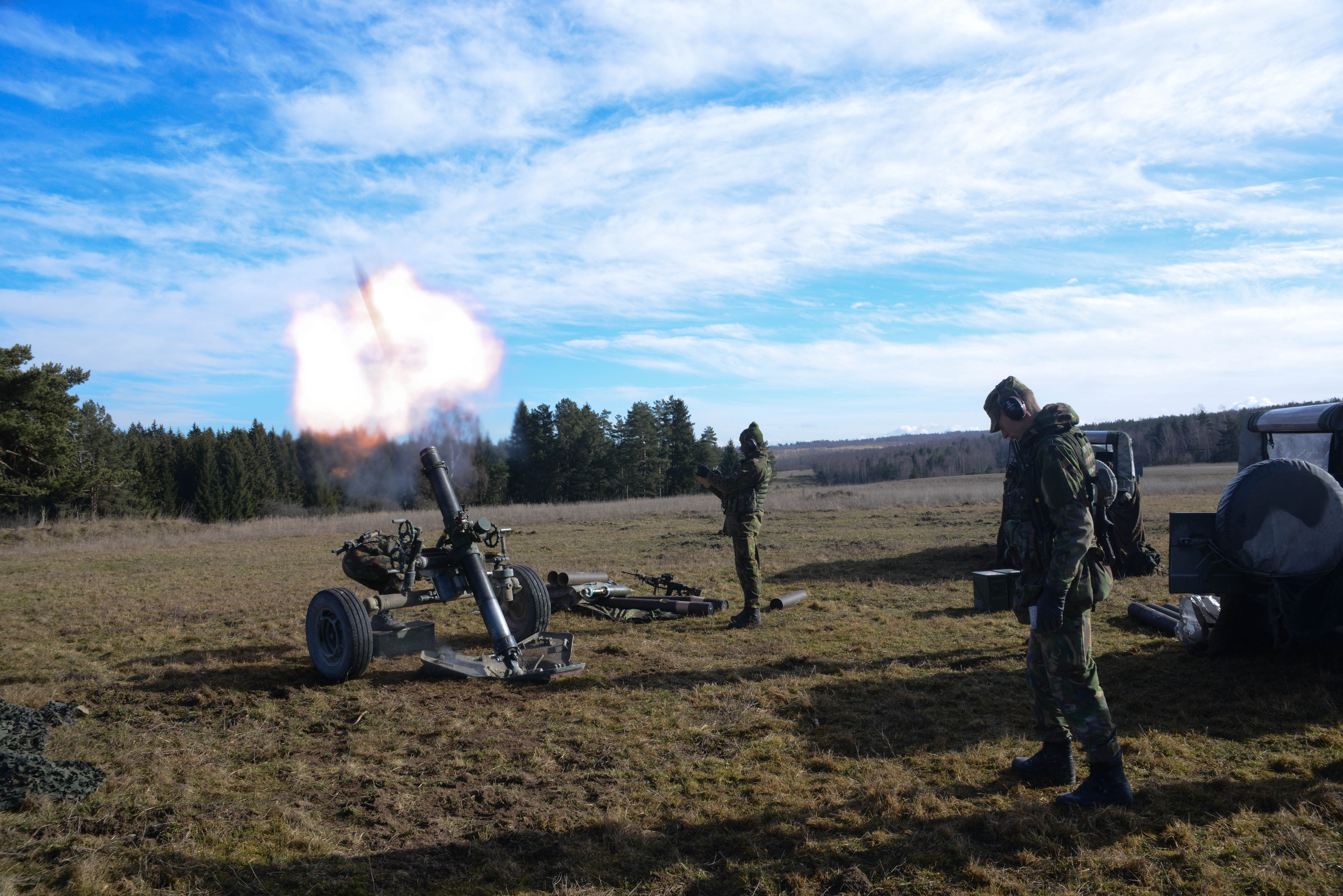
Dutch artillery exercise during "Rampant Lion".

In late February 2014, EUBG 2014 II held an exercise codenamed "Rampant Lion" in Grafenwöhr, Germany. In June 2014, EUBG 2014 II conducted a training exercise in the Ardennes, codenamed "Quick Lion", to prevent ethnic violence between the "Greys" and the "Whites" in the imaginary country of "Blueland".
