= UK–Dutch Battlegroup =

UK–Dutch Battlegroup UK/NL EUBG 2010
- Active: 1 January 2010 – 30 June 2010
- Country: United Kingdom; Netherlands
- Allegiance: European Union
- Branch: EU Battlegroup
- Type: Rapid reaction force
- Size: 1500
- Part of: European Union Military Staff
- Garrison/HQ: London, United Kingdom

The UK–Dutch Battlegroup or UK/NL EUBG 2010 (Dutch: Brits-Nederlandse Battlegroup or Nederlands-Britse Battlegroup) is an EU Battlegroup led by the United Kingdom, in which the Netherlands also participate. It was on standby during the first half of 2010, simultaneously with Battlegroup I-2010.

The core of the battlegroup was formed by the United Kingdom/Netherlands Amphibious Force (UK/NL AF), that has existed since 1972.

== Composition and equipment ==
The Dutch provided the 11th Infantry Company of the Korps Mariniers, mortar support, medical support, a logistics detachment, a senior national representative and personnel for a combined headquarters staff. Within the battlegroup, the marines company is embedded in the 42 Commando Royal Marines.

== Exercise ==
In late November 2009, UK/NL EUBG 2010 conducted exercises, codenamed "Orange Marauder" in the Salisbury Plain Training Area. Evacuation operations, convoy escorting and patrolling, as well as staff functioning, were trained.
