= EU battlegroup =

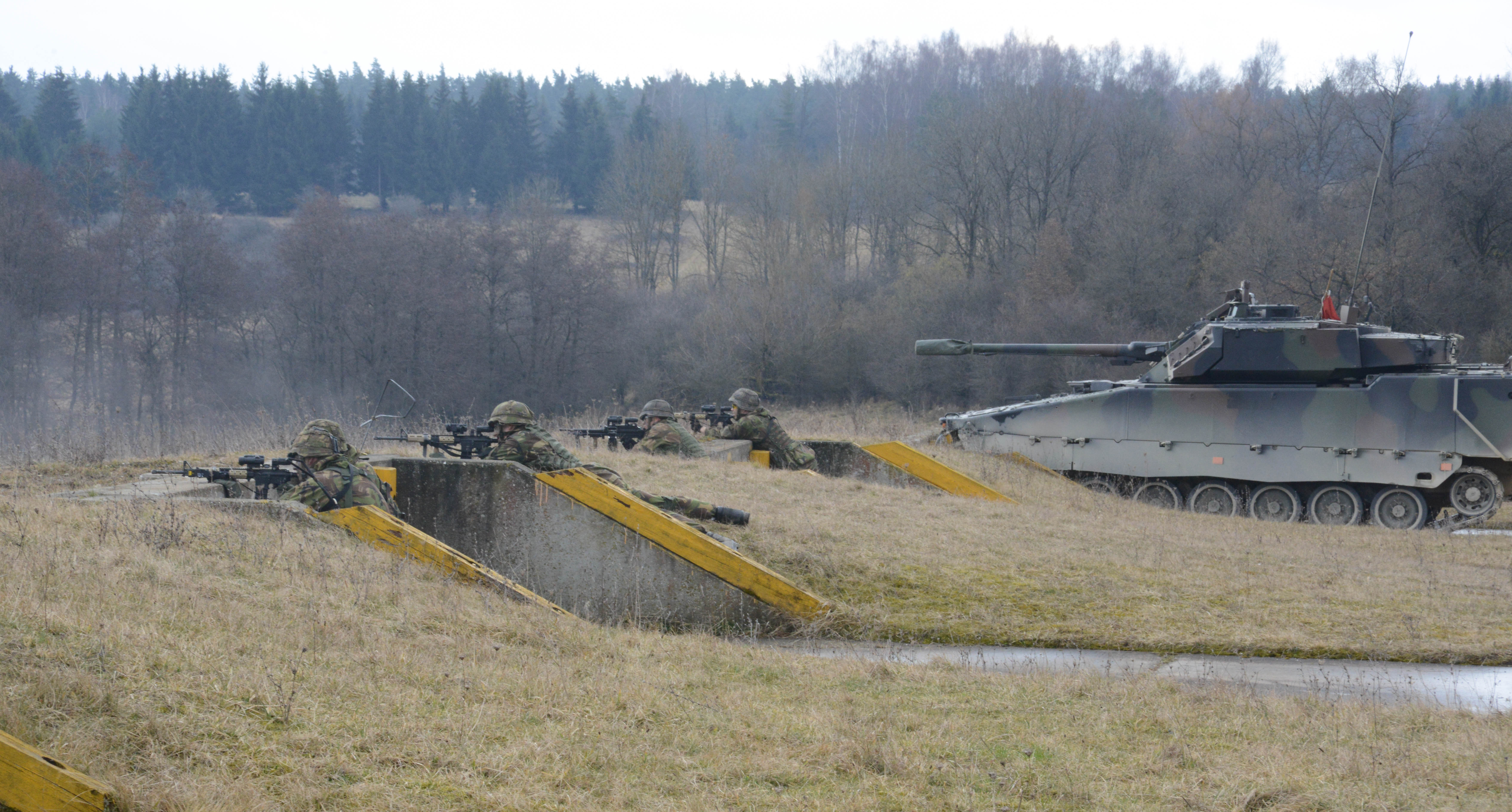
- EUBG 2014 II training in Germany
- Active: 2004–present
- Country: European Union
- Branch: Army
- Type: Framework for creating deployable forces
- Part of: Council of the European Union

An EU battlegroup (EU BG) is a military unit adhering to the Common Security and Defence Policy (CSDP) of the European Union (EU). Often based on contributions from a coalition of member states, each of the eighteen battlegroups consists of a battalion-sized force reinforced with combat support elements (1,500 troops). Two of the battlegroups were to be capable for operational deployment at any one time. The civil power that oversees these battlegroups is the Council of the European Union.

The battlegroup initiative reached full operational capacity on 1 January 2007, but, as of November 2023, they had yet to see operational service. They were developed from existing ad hoc missions that the European Union (EU) had undertaken. The troops and equipment are drawn from the Member States of the European Union under the direction of a "lead nation". In 2004, United Nations Secretary-General Kofi Annan welcomed the plans and emphasised the value and importance of the battlegroups in helping the UN deal with troublespots.

== History ==
=== Background (1999–2005) ===
The initial idea to create EU multinational roughly battalion-sized combined arms units was first publicly raised at the European Council summit on 10–11 December 1999 in Helsinki. The Council produced the Headline Goal 2003 and specified the need for a rapid response capability that members should provide in small forces at high readiness. The idea was reiterated at a Franco-British summit on 4 February 2003 in Le Touquet which highlighted as a priority the need to improve rapid response capabilities, "including initial deployment of land, sea and air forces within 5–10 days." This was again described as essential in the "Headline Goal 2010".

Operation Artemis in 2003 showed an EU rapid reaction and deployment of forces in a short time scale – with the EU going from Crisis Management Concept to operation launch in just three weeks, then taking a further 20 days for substantial deployment. Its success provided a template for the future rapid response deployments allowing the idea to be considered more practically. The following Franco-British summit in November of that year stated that, building on the experience of the operation, the EU should be able and willing to deploy forces within 15 days in response to a UN request. It called specifically for "battlegroup sized forces of around 1500 land forces, personnel, offered by a single nation or through a multinational or framework nation force package".

On 10 February 2004, France, Germany and the United Kingdom released a paper outlining the "battlegroup concept". The document proposed a number of groups based on Artemis that would be autonomous, consisting of about 1500 personnel and deployable within 15 days. These would be principally in response to UN requests at short notice and can be rapidly tailored to specific missions. They would concentrate on bridging operations, preparing the group before a larger force relieved them, for example UN or regional peacekeepers under UN mandate. The plan was approved by all groups in 2004 and in November that year the first thirteen battlegroups were pledged with associated niche capabilities.

=== Early development (2005–2015) ===
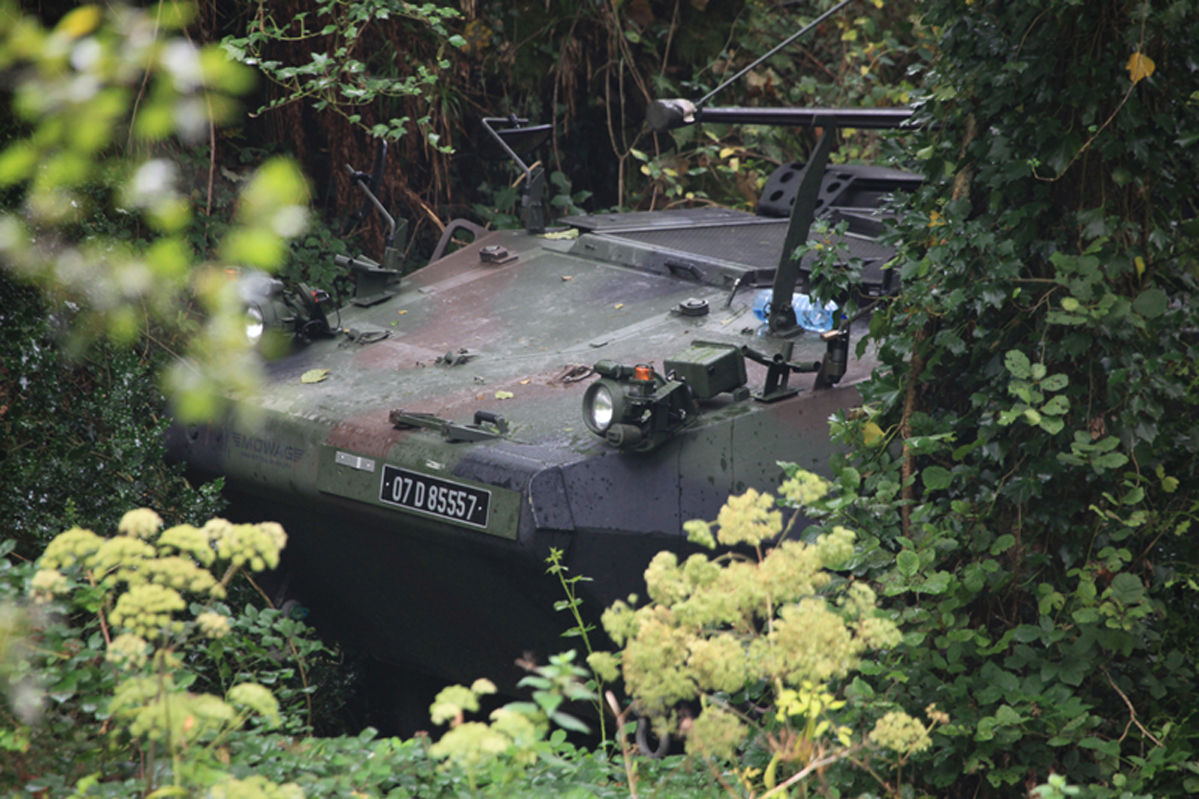
Irish Mowag Piranha during an exercise in 2010

From 1 January 2005 the Battlegroups reached initial operational capacity; full operational capacity was reached on 1 January 2007. Although EU member states were initially highly motivated to volunteer to fill up the roster, the fact that participating member states have to cover their own costs, which especially burdened the smaller states, has made them more reluctant. Besides, many EU member states had simultaneous obligations to fulfill for ISAF and the NATO Response Force, amongst others. This combined with the fact that EU Battlegroups have never been deployed (due to slow political decision-making), despite several occasions in which they according to various experts could or should have been (most notably DR Congo in 2006 and 2008 and Libya in 2011), has led to increasing gaps in the standby roster. Joint funding and actual usage may resolve these issues.

=== MPCC, EDF and PESCO (2016–2020) ===
On 23 June 2016, the Brexit referendum resulted in a vote in favour of the United Kingdom leaving the European Union. Since the UK and France were the largest military powers within the EU, this would mean a serious reduction in forces available for common European defence. On 28 June, High Representative Federica Mogherini presented a new plan, the European Union Global Strategy on Security and Foreign Policy, for rigorous further European military integration between the EU member states. These included more cooperation when planning missions, training and exercising soldiers, and the development of a European defence industry. For the EU Battlegroups specifically, the plan aims to remove the obstacles preventing their rapid deployment, such as the lack of a European military headquarters. Although stressing that NATO will remain the most important defence organisation for many EU countries, Mogherini stated that the Union should be able to operate 'autonomously if necessary' on security matters. Referring to the EU's diplomacy and development record, she said that 'Soft power is not enough', and that in a less secure world, especially after Brexit, common action was needed more than ever.

On 14 November 2016, the 56 European Ministers of Foreign Affairs and Defence agreed to the European Union Global Strategy on Security and Foreign Policy. This included new possibilities for the rapid deployment of EU Battlegroups with aerial support for civil and military operations in conflict zones outside Europe, for example, before a UN peacekeeping force can arrive. Although Mogherini said the Strategy was 'not a European army' or a 'NATO duplicate', the recent U.S. presidential election of Donald Trump, who had previously implicitly threatened to abandon NATO if its European member states continued to fail in meeting their funding obligations, influenced the European Ministers' decision as well. Besides Brexit and the election of Trump, Russia's military expansionism and the European migrant crisis motivated them as well, making them agree relatively easily, which analysts regarded as a breakthrough.

On 6 March 2017, the foreign and defence ministers agreed to establish a small European command centre in Brussels for military training missions abroad, which could grow out to become a European military 'headquarters' in the future. This Military Planning and Conduct Capability (MPCC) was confirmed and established by the Council of the European Union on 8 June 2017. This came one day after the European Commission launched the European Defence Fund (EDF), comprising €5.5 billion per year, to 'coordinate, supplement and amplify national investments in defence research, in the development of prototypes and in the acquisition of defence equipment and technology'. Until then, the lack of a common military fund had been the main obstacle to the effective operational deployment of the EU Battlegroups. An agreement on Permanent Structured Cooperation in Defence (PESCO) was reached at 22–23 June EU summit in Brussels. A June 2017 Eurobarometer opinion poll showed that 75% of Europeans supported a common European security and defence policy, and 55% even favoured a European army. Political leaders such as Dutch PM Mark Rutte commented that a 'European army' was not in the making, however.

=== Strategic Compass and the 2022 Russian invasion of Ukraine (2020–present) ===
During the German EU presidency in the second half of 2020, the EU Common Security and Defence Policy began development of the Strategic Compass for Security and Defence, as of November 2021 envisioning 'substantially modified EU battlegroups' of 5,000 soldiers by 2025. While EU foreign chief Josep Borrell emphasised the EU intervention force should not be in competition with NATO, it was important to reduce operational dependency on the United States to allow EU military formations to function more autonomously, as had become more apparent during the August 2021 Kabul airlift. There continued to be problems in gathering enough troops together, and at the time only one EU Battlegroup of the standard two was available on stand-by.

The Strategic Compass was eventually adopted in March 2022. Although it had already been in development since late 2020, the February 2022 Russian invasion of Ukraine accelerated the development and adoption of the Strategic Compass in March 2022 in Brussels at the meeting of EU foreign and defence ministers, who jointly strongly condemned Russia's actions, made a strong commitment to the complementary cooperation between the EU and NATO, and discussed plans to increase the EU's defensive capabilities. As part of the Strategic Compass, it was decided to create the EU Rapid Deployment Capacity (EU RDC) by further developing the EU Battlegroups (EUBG) 'to be able to act quickly and appropriately, in both civilian and military missions, in the event of a crisis.' As leader of the EU Battlegroup 2025 (to be operational in 2025), Germany would provide a core of the new EU RDC, supported by contributions of other EU member states. At the late May 2022 planning conference for the EU Battlegroup 2025 in Vienna involving 10 EU states, it was decided that the RDC concept was to be finalised by the end of 2022, the advanced battlegroup would include up to 5,000 soldiers from Germany and the Netherlands (lead), Austria (logistics), Hungary, Croatia, and other member states, joint exercises and training would commence in 2023, the force was to be fully operational by 2025, and would be deployed for 12 months in areas up to 6,000 kilometres measured from Brussels. Aside from ground troops, the new force was to include space and cyber capabilities, special forces and strategic airlift capacities, and, depending on requirements, air and naval forces. Another EUBG 2025 planning conference was held in September 2022 at the Multinational Joint Headquarters Ulm, which would likely also serve as the future headquarters at the military-strategic level.

In May 2025, the battlegroup of 5,000 soldiers was operationalized.

== Tasks ==
A Belgian soldier on exercise with the EU Battlegroup in Germany, 2014

The groups are intended to be deployed on the ground within 5–10 days of approval from the council. It must be sustainable for at least 30 days, which could be extended to 120 days, if resupplied.

The Battlegroups are designed to deal with those tasks faced by the Common Security and Defence Policy, namely the Petersberg tasks (military tasks of a humanitarian, peacekeeping and peacemaking nature).

Planners claim the Battlegroups have enough range to deal with all those tasks, although such tasks ought to be limited in "size and intensity" due to the small nature of the groups. Such missions may include conflict prevention, evacuation, aid deliverance or initial stabilisation. In general these would fall into three categories; brief support of existing troops, rapid deployment preparing the ground for larger forces or small-scale rapid response missions.

== Structure ==
A Battlegroup is considered to be the smallest self-sufficient military unit that can be deployed and sustained in a theatre of operation. EU Battlegroups are composed of approximately 1,500 troops; plus, command and support services. The initial thirteen Battlegroups were proposed on 22 November 2004; further battlegroups have joined them since then. Since March 2022, the EU has been planning to increase their size to up to 5,000 troops per battlegroup by 2025.

There is no fixed structure, a 'standard' group would include a headquarters company, three infantry companies and corresponding support personnel. Specific units might include mechanised infantry, support groups (e.g. fire or medical support), the combination of which allows independent action by the group on a variety of tasks. The main forces, extra support and "force headquarters" (front line command) are contained within the Battlegroup "package", in addition there is the operation headquarters, located in Europe.

== Contributions ==
Larger member states will generally contribute their own Battlegroups, while smaller members are expected to create common groups. Each group will have a 'lead nation' or 'framework nation' which will take operational command, based on the model set up during the EU's peacekeeping mission in the Democratic Republic of the Congo (Operation Artemis). Each group will also be associated with a headquarters. Three non-EU NATO countries, Norway, Turkey, and North Macedonia, participate in a group each, as well as one non-EU non-NATO country, Ukraine. From 1992 to 2022, Denmark had an opt-out clause in the Treaty of Maastricht and was not obliged to participate in the Common Security and Defence Policy, but following a 1 June 2022 referendum in favour of abolishing the opt-out, Denmark joined the CSDP a month later on 1 July 2022. Malta currently does not participate in any Battlegroup.

Participating EU NATO member states

- Belgium
- Bulgaria
- Croatia
- Czech Republic
- Denmark
- Estonia
- Finland
- France
- Germany
- Greece
- Hungary
- Italy
- Latvia
- Lithuania
- Luxembourg
- Netherlands
- Poland
- Portugal
- Romania
- Slovakia
- Slovenia
- Spain
- Sweden

Participating EU non-NATO member states

- Austria
- Cyprus
- Ireland

Participating non-EU NATO member states

- Norway
- Turkey
- North Macedonia

Participating non-EU non-NATO member states

- Ukraine
- Serbia

Non-participating EU member states

- Malta

=== Standby roster ===
From 1 January 2005 the Battlegroups reached initial operational capacity: at least one Battlegroup was on standby every 6 months. The United Kingdom and France each had an operational Battlegroup for the first half of 2005, and Italy for the second half. In the first half of 2006, a Franco-German Battlegroup operated, and the Spanish–Italian Amphibious Battlegroup. In the second half of that year just one Battlegroup operated composed of France, Germany and Belgium.

Full operational capacity was reached on 1 January 2007, meaning the Union could undertake two Battlegroup sized operations concurrently, or deploy them simultaneously into the same field. The Battlegroups rotate every 6 months, the roster from 2007 onwards is as follows;

Standby roster, in which biannual periods I and II are January to June and June to December, respectively
Period		Battle Group	Framework nation	Other participants*	Force HQ (FHQ)	Size
2005	I	French Battlegroup	France	–	Paris	
2005	I	British Battlegroup	United Kingdom	–	London	
2005	II	Italian Battlegroup	Italy	–	Rome	
2005	II	vacant	–	–	–	
2006	I	French–German Battlegroup	France	Germany	Paris	
2006	I	Spanish–Italian Amphibious Battlegroup	Italy	Spain, Greece and Portugal	Rome	1500
2006	II	French–German–Belgian Battlegroup	France	Germany and Belgium	Paris	
2006	II	vacant	–	–	–	
2007	I	French–Belgian Battlegroup	France	Belgium	Paris	
2007	I	Battlegroup 107	Germany	The Netherlands and Finland	Potsdam	1720
2007	II	Multinational Land Force	Italy	Hungary and Slovenia	Udine	1500
2007	II	Balkan Battlegroup	Greece	Bulgaria, Romania and Cyprus	Larissa	1500
2008	I	Nordic Battlegroup (NBG08)	Sweden	Estonia, Latvia, Lithuania, Finland, Ireland and Norway	Enköping	1500
2008	I	Spanish-led Battlegroup	Spain	Germany, France and Portugal	Unknown	Unknown
2008	II	French–German Battlegroup	France	Germany	Paris	Unknown
2008	II	British Battlegroup	United Kingdom	–	London	
2009	I	Spanish–Italian Amphibious Battlegroup	Italy	Spain, Greece and Portugal	Rome	1500
2009	I	Balkan Battlegroup	Greece	Bulgaria, Romania and Cyprus	Unknown	1500
2009	II	Czech–Slovak Battlegroup	Czech Republic	Slovakia		2500
2009	II	Belgian-led Battlegroup	Belgium	Luxembourg and France	Unknown	???
2010	I	Battlegroup I-2010	Poland	Germany, Slovakia, Latvia and Lithuania	Międzyrzecz	
2010	I	UK–Dutch Battlegroup	United Kingdom	The Netherlands	London	1500
2010	II	Italian-Romanian-Turkish Battlegroup	Italy	Romania and Turkey	Rome	
2010	II	Spain, France, Portugal	Unknown	Unknown		
2011	I	Battlegroup 107 (EUBG 2011/1)	Netherlands	Germany, Finland, Austria and Lithuania	Unknown	c. 2350
2011	I	Nordic Battlegroup (NBG11)	Sweden	Estonia, Finland, Ireland, Norway and Croatia	Enköping	1500
2011	II	Eurofor (Eurofor EUBG 2011–2)	Portugal	Spain, Italy, France	Florence	
2011	II	Balkan Battlegroup	Greece	Bulgaria, Romania, Cyprus and Ukraine	Larissa	1500
2012	I	French–Belgian–Luxembourgish Battlegroup	France	Belgium and Luxembourg	Mont-Valérien	
2012	I	vacant	–	–	–	
2012	II	Multinational Land Force	Italy	Hungary and Slovenia.	Udine	
2012	II	German–Czech–Austrian Battlegroup	Germany	Austria, the Czech Republic, Croatia, North Macedonia, Ireland	Ulm	
2013	I	Weimar Battlegroup (EU BG I/2013)	Poland	Germany and France	Międzyrzecz	
2013	I	Belgium, Luxembourg, France (unconfirmed)	Unknown	Unknown	Unknown	Unknown
2013	II	Battlegroup 42	United Kingdom	Lithuania, Latvia, Sweden and the Netherlands	London	
2013	II	Belgium (unconfirmed)	Belgium			
2014	I	Balkan Battlegroup	Greece	Bulgaria, Romania, Cyprus and Ukraine		
2014	I	Sweden, Finland (unconfirmed)	Sweden			
2014	II	EUBG 2014 II	Belgium	Germany, Luxembourg, Spain, the Netherlands and North Macedonia		2500–3700
2014	II	Spanish–Italian Amphibious Battlegroup	Spain	Italy		
2015	I	Nordic Battlegroup (NBG15)	Sweden	Norway, Finland, Estonia, Latvia, Lithuania and Ireland	France	
2015	I	vacant	–	–	–	
2015	II	French–Belgian Battlegroup	France	Belgium		
2015	II	vacant	–	–	–	
2016	I	Visegrád Battlegroup	Poland	Hungary, the Czech Republic, Slovakia and Ukraine	Kraków	3700
2016	I	Balkan Battlegroup	Greece	Bulgaria, Romania, Cyprus and Ukraine		
2016	II	German–Czech–Austrian Battlegroup	Germany	Austria, the Czech Republic, Croatia, Ireland, Luxembourg and the Netherlands		1500–2500
2016	II	British-led Battlegroup	United Kingdom	Finland, Ireland, Latvia, Lithuania, Sweden and Ukraine		
2017	I	Multinational Land Force	Italy	Austria, Croatia, Hungary and Slovenia		
2017	I	French–Belgian Battlegroup	France	Belgium		
2017	II	Spanish-led Battlegroup	Spain	Italy, Portugal	Bétera	2500
2017	II	Multinational Land Force	Italy	Austria, Croatia, Hungary and Slovenia		
2018	I	Balkan Battlegroup	Greece	Bulgaria, Romania, Cyprus and Ukraine		
2018	I	Benelux Battlegroup	Netherlands	Austria, Belgium, and Luxembourg		
2018	II	Benelux Battlegroup	Netherlands	Austria, Belgium, Germany and Luxembourg		2500–3700
2018	II	vacant	–	–	–	–
2019	I	Spanish-led Battlegroup	Spain	Italy, Portugal		
2019	I	French–Belgian Battlegroup	France	Belgium	Mont Valérien	
2019	II	Visegrád Battlegroup	Poland	Hungary, the Czech Republic, Slovakia and Croatia	Kraków	2250
2019	II	French-led Battlegroup	France		Mont Valérien	
2020	I	Balkan Battlegroup	Greece	Bulgaria, Romania, Cyprus, Ukraine and Serbia		
2020	I	vacant	–	–	–	–
2020	II	German-Czech-Austrian Battlegroup (EU Battlegroup 2020–2)	Germany	Austria, the Czech Republic, Croatia, Finland, Ireland, Latvia, Netherlands and Sweden	Ulm	4100
2020	II	Italian-led Battlegroup	Italy	Greece, Spain		
2021	I	German-Czech-Austrian Battlegroup (EU Battlegroup 2020–2)	Germany	Austria, the Czech Republic, Croatia, Finland, Ireland, Latvia, Netherlands and Sweden	Ulm	4100
2021	I	Battlegroup Name	Framework nation	Other participants	HQ	Size
2021	II	vacant	–	–	–	–
2021	II	Battlegroup Name	Framework nation	Other participants	HQ	Size
2022	I	Battlegroup Name	Framework nation	Other participants	HQ	Size
2022	I	Battlegroup Name	Framework nation	Other participants	HQ	Size
2022	II	Battlegroup Name	Framework nation	Other participants	HQ	Size
2022	II	Battlegroup Name	Framework nation	Other participants	HQ	Size
2023	I	Visegrád Battlegroup	?	the Czech Republic, Slovakia, Hungary and Poland	?	?
2023	I	Battlegroup Name	Framework nation	Other participants	HQ	Size
2023	II	Battlegroup Name	Framework nation	Other participants	HQ	Size
2023	II	Battlegroup Name	Framework nation	Other participants	HQ	Size
2025	12 months	EU Battlegroup 2025 (EU RDC)	Germany, Netherlands	Austria, Hungary, Croatia, Sweden, others	Ulm	5,000

There are plans to extend the concept to air and naval forces, although not to the extent of having a single standing force on standby, but scattered forces which could be rapidly assembled.

=== Recurring formations ===
- Nordic Battlegroup
- Balkan Battlegroup
- Visegrád Battlegroup
- Multinational Land Force
- Spanish–Italian Amphibious Battlegroup

=== Niche capabilities ===
The following Member States have also offered niche capabilities in support of the EU Battlegroups:

- Cyprus (medical group)
- Lithuania (a water purification unit)
- Greece (the Athens Sealift Co-ordination Centre)
- France (structure of a multinational and deployable Force Headquarters)

=== Further details on specific contributions ===
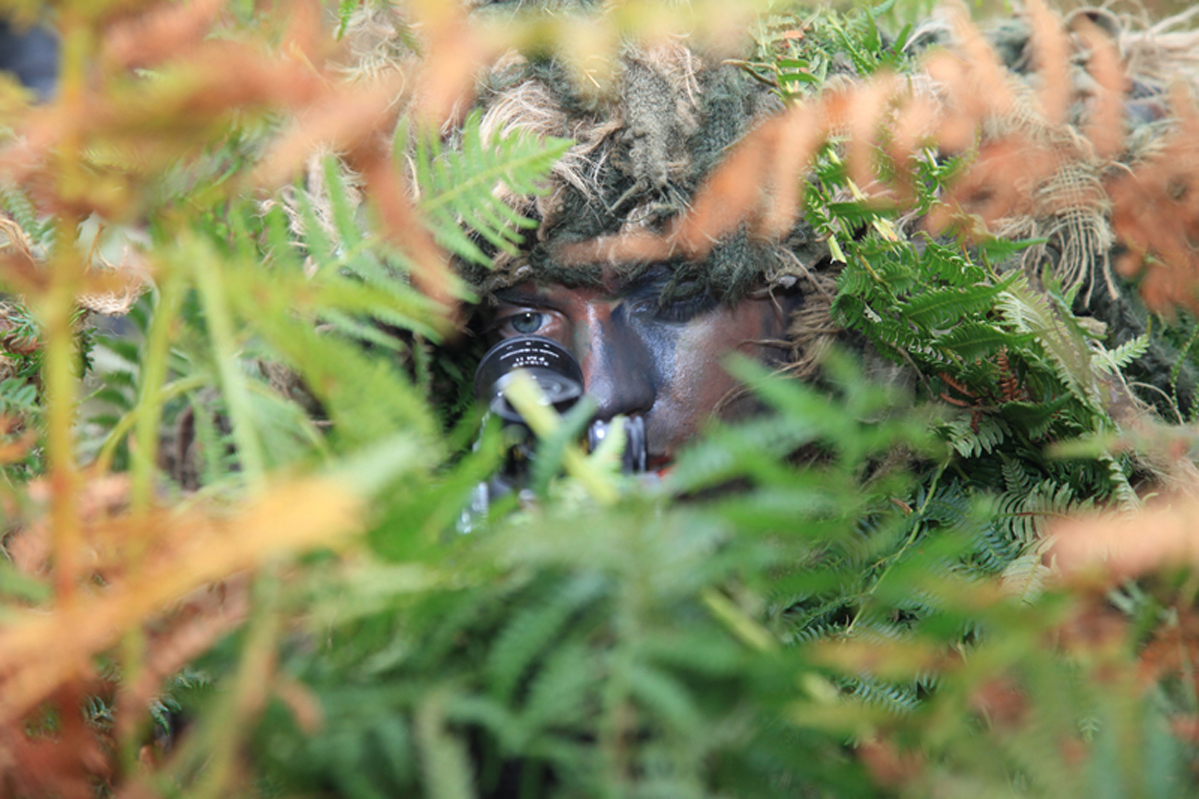
Nordic Battlegroup sniper training at Kilworth, Ireland

- Sweden and Finland announced the creation of a joint Nordic Battlegroup. To make up the required 1500 number, they also urged Norway to contribute to the Battlegroup despite that country not being part of the EU. Recently, the number has been raised to 2400 troops with Sweden providing 2000 of these. According to Swedish newspapers the price for the 6 months in 2008 was 1.2 billion Swedish kronor (app. 150,000,000 euros) and the Battlegroup was not used.
- Finland is expected to commit troops trained to combat chemical and biological weapons, among other units such as a mortar company.
- Lithuania is expected to offer experts in water purification.
- Greece is pledging troops with maritime transport skills.
- Ireland has offered bomb disposal experts among its contribution.

The Battlegroups project is not to be confused with the projected Helsinki Headline Goal force, which concerns up to 60,000 soldiers, deployable for at least a year, and take one to two months to deploy. The Battlegroups are instead meant for more rapid and shorter deployment in international crises, probably preparing the ground for a larger and more traditional force to replace them in due time.

=== Western Balkans Battlegroup proposal ===
In 2010, a group of experts from the Belgrade Centre for Security Policy proposed the establishment of a Western Balkans Battlegroup by 2020. In a policy vision titled "Towards a Western Balkans Battlegroup: A vision of Serbia's Defence Integration into the EU 2010-2020", they argued that the creation of such a Battlegroup would not only be an accelerating factor in the accession of the former Yugoslav republics into the EU, but also a strong symbolic message of reconciliation and security community reconstruction after the devastating wars of the 1990s. Furthermore, the authors of the study argued that such a Western Balkan Battlegroup, notwithstanding all the political challenges, would have a very high linguistic, cultural and military interoperability. Although decision makers initially showed a weak interest in the Western Balkans Battlegroup, the idea has recently reappeared in the parliamentary discussions in Serbia.

== Exercises ==
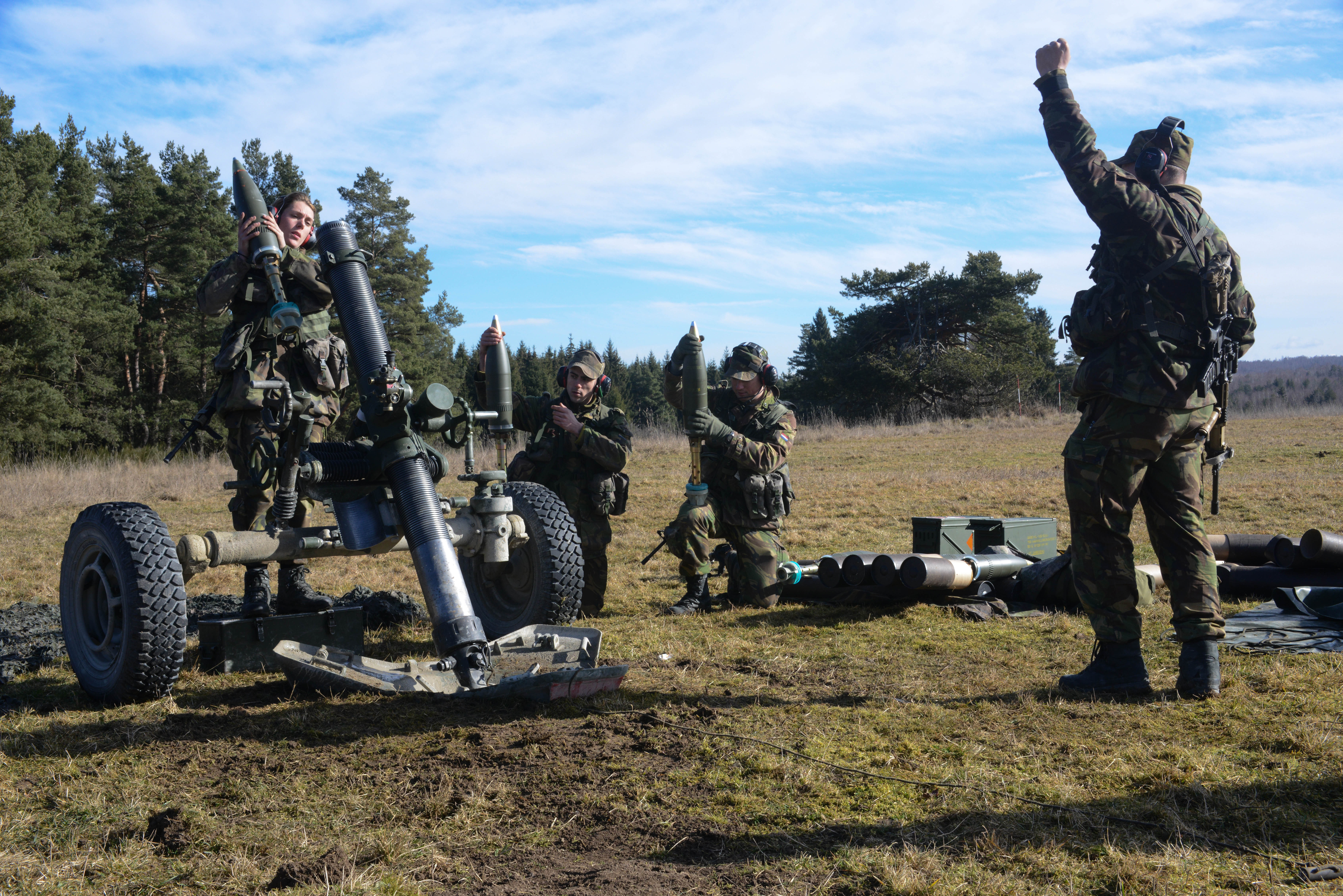
Dutch artillery exercise in Grafenwoehr, Germany, 2014

In 2008, the EU Battlegroup conducted wargames to protect the first-ever free elections in the imaginary country of Vontinalys. In June 2014, EUBG 2014 II with 3,000 troops from Belgium, Germany, Luxembourg, North Macedonia, the Netherlands and Spain conducted a training exercise in the Ardennes, codenamed 'Quick Lion', to prevent ethnic violence between the "Greys" and the "Whites" in the imaginary country of "Blueland".

== See also ==
- Combined Joint Expeditionary Force (CJEF)
- EUFOR
- European Union Military Staff
