= Czech–Slovak Battlegroup =

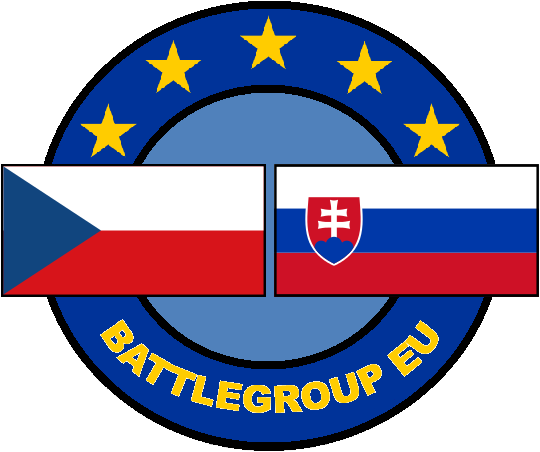
- Active: 1 July – 31 December 2009
- Country: Czech Republic; Slovakia
- Allegiance: European Union
- Branch: EU Battlegroup
- Type: Regiment
- Size: 2,600
- Part of: European Union Military Staff

The Czech–Slovak Battlegroup also, incorrectly, called the Czech–Slovak Battle Group is an EU Battlegroup, led by the Czech Republic, in which Slovakia also participates.

== History ==
The decision to form the CSB (Czech-Slovak Battlegroup), was made in 2005, and developed in 2006. Between 2006 and 2008, the details of the chain of command were negotiated. The group was active in 2009, and was at full preparedness from 1 July 2009 until 31 December 2009.

== Structure ==
The CSB consists of 2,600 soldiers, 2,200 of which are Czechs, and 400 Slovaks. When at full preparedness, the CSB is capable of rapid deployment to anywhere within 6,000 kilometres (3,700 mi) of Brussels.

== See also ==
- Visegrád Battlegroup
