= Battlegroup I-2010 =

Battlegroup I-2010 (BG I-2010)
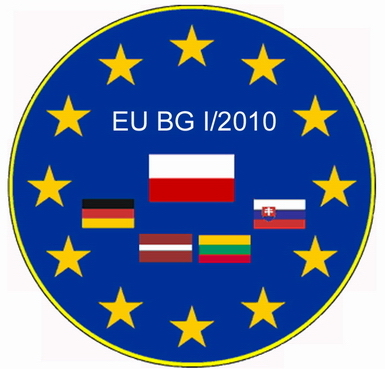
- Emblem of Battlegroup I-2010
- Active: 1 January 2010 – 30 June 2010
- Country: Poland; Germany; Lithuania; Latvia; Slovakia
- Allegiance: European Union
- Branch: EU Battlegroup
- Size: 2500
- Garrison/HQ: Warsaw, Poland
- Nickname(s): Polish-led Battlegroup

Commanders
- Current commander: Brigade general Slawomir Wojciechowski

Battlegroup I-2010 or BG I-2010 is an EU Battlegroup led by Poland (therefore also known as the Polish-led Battlegroup), in which Germany, Lithuania, Latvia and Slovakia also participate. It was on standby during the first half of 2010.
