= Visegrád Battlegroup =

Visegrád Battlegroup V4 EU Battlegroup
- Active: 1 January 2016 – 30 June 2016; 1 July 2019 – 31 December 2019
- Country: Poland; Czech Republic; Slovakia; Hungary
- Allegiance: European Union
- Branch: EU Battlegroup
- Type: Regiment
- Size: 3700
- Part of: European Union Military Staff

The Visegrád Battlegroup or V4 EU Battlegroup is an EU Battlegroup led by Poland, in which the other fellow Visegrád Group countries – the Czech Republic, Slovakia and Hungary participate. It was on standby from 1 January until 30 June 2016 and from 1 July until 31 December 2019. It's scheduled to go on standby in the first half of 2023.

== History ==
On 12 May 2011, Polish Defence Minister Bogdan Klich said that Poland would lead a new EU Battlegroup of the Visegrád Group. The decision was made at the V4 defence ministers' meeting in Levoča, Slovakia, and the battlegroup became operational and was placed on standby in the first half of 2016. The ministers also agreed that the V4 militaries should hold regular exercises under the auspices of the NATO Response Force, with the first such exercise to be held in Poland in 2013. The battlegroup included the members of V4 and Ukraine.

To become a strategic success, the battlegroup experience needs to be seized upon to open the door for more permanent forms of collaboration in the region.

— DAV4 II Report (Central European Policy Institute)

On 14 March 2014, a pact was signed on a joint military body within the European Union, in response to the 2014 Russian military intervention in Ukraine. The deal involves joint military exercises, coordinated defence procurement and joint defence development of the four central European countries. In the Bratislava Declaration of 9 December 2014, the V4 stated that, considering "Russia’s aggressive actions against Ukraine (...) V4 countries will coordinate their national positions to maximise the efforts to support Ukraine", confirming Ukraine's participation in the Visegrád Battlegroup in the first half of 2016. On Polish suggestion, the V4 agreed "to form another V4 EU Battlegroup in the second semester of 2019". The V4 are considering to keep the Battlegroup as a permanent unit after 2016, which would set a precedent. The Battlegroup is deemed the 'flagship' of intensified future "systemic and systematic defence planning, exercises and perhaps even procurement and maintenance" amongst the V4.

The V4 EU BG was reinforced by Ukraine in 2016 and by Croatia in 2019. In 2023, the V4 EU BG will be reinforced by Croatia, Latvia and Lithuania.

== Composition and equipment ==
The Battlegroup in 2016 consisted of around 3,700 troops:

Poland	1 870	main manoeuvre combat forces
Czech Republic	728	logisticians, helicopter unit, electronic combat team, medical unit
Hungary	640	combat engineers, civil-military cooperation unit
Slovakia	460	unit for protection against weapons of mass destruction
Ukraine	19	

== See also ==
- Czech–Slovak Battlegroup
- Czech Republic–Russia relations
- Hungary–Russia relations
- Poland–Russia relations
- Russia–Slovakia relations
- Russia–Ukraine relations
- Ukraine–European Union relations
- War in Donbas
- Warsaw Pact
- NATO
