= Battlegroup 107 =

Battlegroup 107 (BG-107) – (EUBG 2011/1)
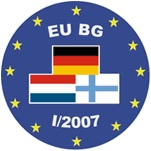
- 2007 emblem.
- Active: 1 January 2007 – 30 June 2007; 1 January 2011 – 30 June 2011
- Country: Germany; Netherlands; Finland; Austria (since 2010); Lithuania (since 2010)
- Allegiance: European Union
- Branch: EU Battlegroup
- Type: Rapid reaction force
- Size: 1720 (2007) c. 2350 (2011)
- Part of: European Union Military Staff
- Garrison/HQ: Potsdam, Germany

Commanders
- Current commander: Brigadier General Michiel van der Laan (2011)

Battlegroup 107 or BG-107 is an EU Battlegroup. It originally consisted of military elements from the Netherlands (720 soldiers), Germany (800 soldiers), and Finland (200 soldiers). From 1 January 2007 until 30 June 2007, it was on standby under German leadership. In preparation for its second standby period in the first half of 2011, when it was also known as EUBG 2011/1, its composition changed; Austrian and Lithuanian troops were added, the Netherlands took over command.

== History ==
Dutch minister of Defence Henk Kamp and his EU colleagues agreed upon the formation of the Dutch–German–Finnish battlegroup on 22 November 2004 in Brussels. Because the Finnish were assigned to intelligence work, they were informally known as the "Nokia brigade".

The final exercise took place at the German air base at Leipheim in late 2006. Following the exercise, lieutenant-general Hans Sonneveld, second-in-command of the Dutch forces, commented that the EU Battlegroups are a new step towards the "rising self-awareness of Europe".

== Composition and equipment ==
Battlegroup 107 originally consisted of 720 Dutch soldiers, 800 German soldiers and 200 Finnish soldiers. The Netherlands provided an infantry company, a medical taskforce, a logistics battalion, headquarters personnel and an intelligence unit. Germany provided many infantry troops, Finland provided armoured vehicles for camp security. Besides armoured vehicles, anti-tank weapons and light machine guns, the battlegroup has a German frigate and German destroyers at its disposal. The Netherlands also provide a frigate and fighter aircraft and attack helicopters if necessary.

== Exercises ==
From 30 September to 8 October 2010, the Battlegroup conducted training exercises in the Dutch–Belgian triangle Oirschot, Brasschaat and Maasmechelen. The operation, codenamed "European Rhino 1", centred on supporting the government of the fictitious country of 'Blueland' in restoring and maintaining order after ethnic tensions between the minority in power and other groups within the population erupted. From 30 November until 12 December 2010, operation "European Rhino 2" was carried out in Budel, Netherlands, where the 300 members of staff were trained.
