= Baltic Sea underwater infrastructure incidents =

The Baltic Sea is traversed by many means of communication and power distribution and by pipelines. These are vulnerable to incidents which might damage them, in particular involving anchoring. There have been multiple incidents which have caused disruption to undersea infrastructure.

== Summary table ==
Baltic Sea Underwater Infrastructure Events
Date	Facility	Type	Between	And	Nature of event	Suspects	Notes
10 October 2004	Bornholm Cable	power cable	Sweden	Denmark	severed	possibly Tuc Merkur	tug and barge with coal to the Avedøre Power Station
January 2010	Bornholm Cable	power cable	Sweden	Denmark	severed	Timberland	
15 January 2013	Bornholm Cable	power cable	Sweden	Denmark	severed	not named	compensation paid
28 February 2022	Bornholm Cable	power cable	Sweden	Denmark	severed	tanker Samus Swan	tanker's anchor fouled the cable
26 September 2022	Nord Stream 1 & 2	gas pipelines	Russia	Germany	explosion	unknown	Danish and German investigations
7 October 2023	EE-S1	fiberoptic communications cable	Sweden	Estonia	partly severed	cargo ships Sevmorput and Newnew Polar Bear	investigation concluded cable was damaged by external force
8 October 2023	Balticconnector	gas pipeline	Finland	Estonia	physical	container ship Newnew Polar Bear	Chinese government later admitted the ship was at fault
18 November 2024	BCS East-West Interlink	data cable	Sweden	Lithuania	severed	bulk carrier Yi Peng 3	investigation ongoing
18 November 2024	C-Lion1	data cable	Finland	Germany	severed	bulk carrier Yi Peng 3	investigation ongoing
25 December 2024	Estlink 2	power cable	Finland	Estonia	severed	oil tanker Eagle S	investigation ongoing
26 January 2025	TV & Radio	fiberoptic TV & radio cable	Sweden	Latvia	severed	Vezhen or Silver Dania?	suspicions of deliberate sabotage later dropped - deemed an accident
26 January 2025 (detected February)	C-Lion1 submarine cable	telecommunications	Finland	Germany	data disturbance	?	investigation ongoing
31 December 2025	Elisa data cable	data cable	Finland	Estonia	data disruption	freighter Fitburg	investigation ongoing; anchor dragged 10s of km

== See also ==
- 2024 Baltic Sea submarine cable disruptions
- Cable landing point
- List of international submarine communications cables
- Nordic Warden
- Russian hybrid warfare
- Russian sabotage operations in Europe
- Russian shadow fleet
- Severing of the Svalbard undersea cable
