= Nordic Warden =

Operation Nordic Warden is a naval operation started in 2025 by ten Joint Expeditionary Force countries in the Baltic Sea. The purpose is to monitor ships of the Russian shadow fleet that carry petroleum products such as petrol and liquified natural gas. It is NATO and JEF countries’ response to several alleged incidents of damaging Baltic undersea cables and pipelines (including Baltic Connector, EE-S1, C-Lion1, and Estlink 2) by ships Newnew Polar Bear, Yi Peng 3 and Eagle S during 2023 and 2024.

The operation makes use of artificial intelligence to inspect vessels' tracks, as reported via AIS, to select suspicious cases where it might be worth dispatching JEF assets to inspect the vessel and check against anchor-dragging.
