= 2024 Baltic Sea submarine cable disruptions =

Dual telecommunication cable faults

- Date: 17–18 November
- Location: Baltic Sea
- Cause: Under investigation

On 17–18 November 2024, two submarine telecommunication cables, the BCS East-West Interlink and C-Lion1 fibre-optic cables, were disrupted in the Baltic Sea. The incidents involving both cables occurred in close proximity to each other and near-simultaneously, which prompted accusations from European government officials and NATO member states of hybrid warfare and sabotage as the cause of the damage. Currently, the damage to those undersea cables has not been conclusively attributed to any specific party. Investigations are ongoing and since 19 November, the Chinese cargo ship Yi Peng 3 has been under scrutiny due to its presence near the cables at the time of the incidents. Western intelligence officials believe the ship's anchor may have caused the damage, either accidentally or under the influence of Russian intelligence.

== Background ==
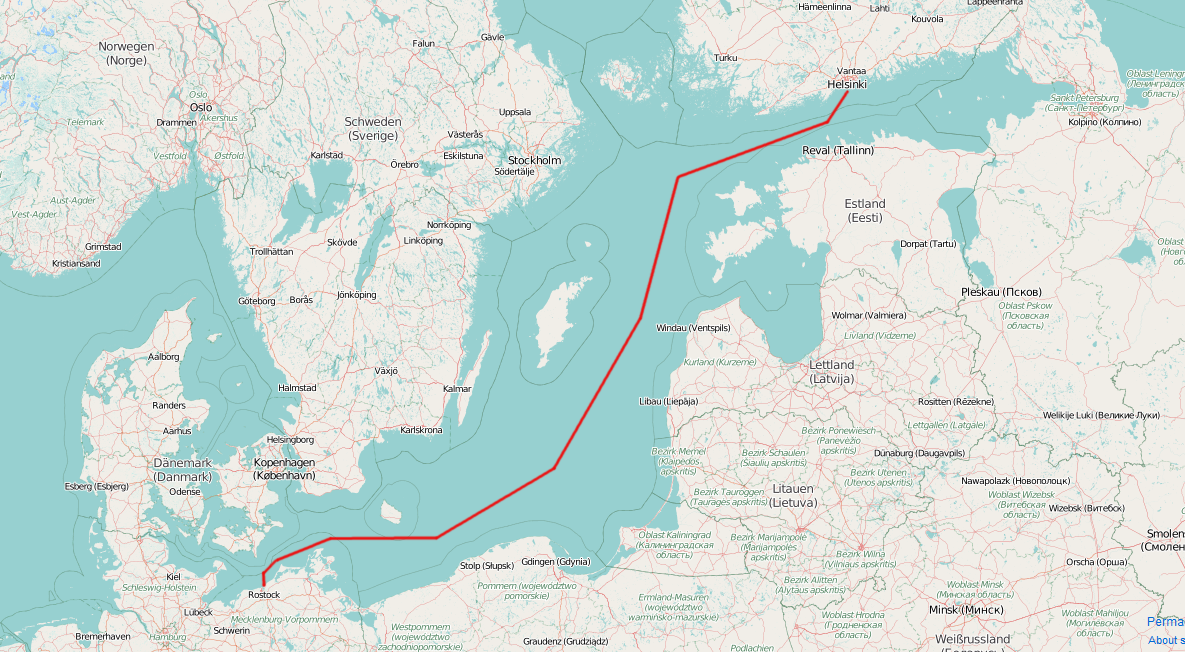
Location of C-Lion1

The BCS East West Interlink is a 218 km (135 mi) long submarine data communication cable that runs through the Baltic Sea, built in 1997 by Alcatel and owned by Arelion. It connects Sventoji in Lithuania to Katthammarsvik on the east coast of the Swedish island of Gotland. From Gotland another cable passes data to the Swedish mainland. The C-Lion1 is a submarine communications cable between Finland and Germany. The cable is owned and operated by Finnish telecommunications and IT services company Cinia Oy; it is the first direct communications cable between Finland and Central Europe, and has operated since May 2016.

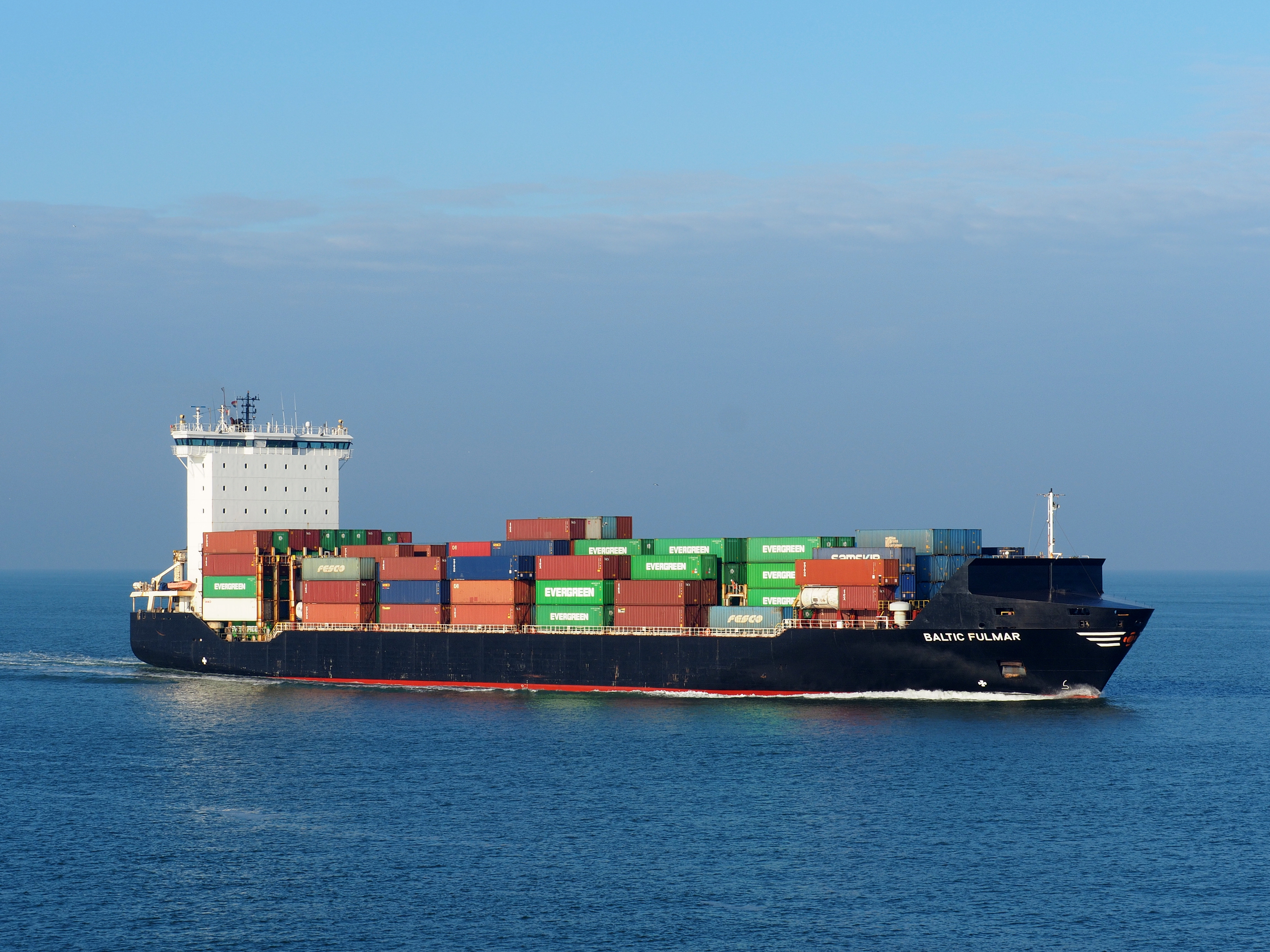
Chinese ship Newnew Polar Bear (IMO 9313204) is suspected of causing the Balticconnector incident

A year before, a similar undersea infrastructure disruption event, the Balticconnector incident, occurred when the Chinese ship Newnew Polar Bear dragged its anchor across the seabed, damaging a pipeline and submarine cables between Sweden and Estonia.

Worldwide, about 200 undersea cables have been cut or disrupted annually as of 2024, due most frequently to unintentional damage from fishing equipment or the anchors of ships.

== Disruptions from 18 November 2024 ==
On Monday, 18 November 2024, the telecommunications company Telia Lithuania announced that the BCS East-West Interlink submarine cable between Lithuania and Sweden had been "cut" on Sunday morning at around 10 a.m. local time. At around the same time, the submarine cable C-Lion1 for data communication between Finland and Germany was cut in the same region of the Baltic Sea. As a result, both of their telecom services were disrupted. The C-Lion1 fault was discovered off the coast of the Swedish island of Öland. The two faults were detected about 97–105 kilometres (60–65 mi) apart from each other. The BCS East-West cable is at a depth of 100–150 metres (330–490 ft) and C-Lion at 20–40 metres (66–131 ft) deep.

An Arelion spokesperson described the damage to the BCS East-West Interlink cable as "...not a partial damage. It's full damage." At the time of the incident, the cable provided about 1/3rd of the internet capacity of Lithuania.

According to C-Lion1 operator Cinia Oy, the cable was severed by an outside force. Cinia chief executive Ari-Jussi Knaapila stated that the company was in the process of conducting physical inspections at the site of the fault.

BCS East-West Interlink and C-Lion1 were restored on 28 November 2024.

The Swedish authorities deemed the 2025 January Vezhen incident as an accident, not deliberate.

On 8 February 2025, a Russian cable was inoperable and being repaired by Russian ships in Finnish waters in the Gulf of Finland, while being monitored by the Finnish Coast Guard Turva.

On 21 February 2025, Cinia announced there had been damage to a data cable between Germany and Finland, with sabotage suspected at a location east of Gotland.

== Reactions ==
On 18 November, the Foreign Ministers of Germany and Finland issued a joint statement expressing "deep concern" over the C-Lion1 cable's disruption, and expressed suspicion over possible hybrid warfare conducted by Russia, causing the disruptions in the midst of the Russian invasion of Ukraine and elevated tension against NATO member states. German Federal Defense Minister Boris Pistorius called the incident an act of sabotage. He further stated that "no one" believed that the cables were cut accidentally. The Lithuanian Naval Force announced increased surveillance of its waters in response to the damage and would discuss further measures with Lithuania its allies. The Lithuanian Armed Forces stated that NATO members corresponded with one another to determine the cause of the disruptions.

European governments accused Russia of escalating hybrid attacks on Ukraine's Western allies, but not directly accusing Russia of destroying the seacables.

Kremlin spokesman Dmitry Peskov rejected suspicions and called it "absurd", accusing Russia without evidence.

On 26 November 2024, Chinese Foreign Affairs Ministry issued a statement of "no knowledge" regarding the incident.

== Suspicious ships ==
The Yi Peng 3 came under investigation for the 2024 Baltic Sea submarine cable disruptions. It was identified at both scenes, and by the time it reached the Great Belt strait, the Royal Danish Navy started following the ship.

=== Yi Peng 3 ===
History
- Name: Leda (2001–2007); Avra (2007–2016); Yi Peng 3 (2016–present)
- Port of registry: Majuro, Marshall Islands (2001–2007); Piraeus, Greece (2007–2015); Monrovia, Liberia (2015–2016); Ningbo, China (2016–present)
- Ordered: January 2000
- Builder: Samho Heavy Industries (Samho, Yeongam, South Korea)
- Yard number: 1084
- Laid down: 14 February 2001
- Launched: 18 May 2001
- Completed: 5 July 2001
- Identification: IMO number: 9224984; MMSI number: 414270000; Call sign: BLBK9
- Status: In service

General characteristics
- Type: Bulk carrier
- Tonnage: 40,622 GT; 24,975 NT; 75,121 DWT
- Displacement: 86,760 tonnes (85,390 long tons; 95,640 short tons)
- Length: 225 m (738 ft 2 in)
- Beam: 32.3 m (106 ft 0 in)
- Draught: 14.167 m (46 ft 5.8 in)
- Installed power: MAN-B&W 6S60MC (11,160 kW)
- Propulsion: Single shaft with fixed pitch propeller
- Speed: 14.8 knots (27.4 km/h; 17.0 mph)
- Capacity: 7 cargo holds, 90,124 m^{3} (3,182,700 cu ft)
- Crew: 24

Yi Peng 3 (Chinese: 伊鹏3; pinyin: Yī Péng Sān), originally named Leda and later Avra, was built in 2001 in South Korea by Samho Heavy Industries. It has been owned since 2016 by Ningbo Yipeng Shipping Co., Ltd., in Ningbo, Zhejiang and was renamed Yi Peng 3.

==== Baltic Sea voyage, November 2024 ====
The Yi Peng 3 left the port of Ust-Luga, Russia, on 15 November with a load of fertilizer, a week prior to the cables being damaged. Information about the ship's destination offered by media outlets has varied, the most frequently mentioned being Port Said, Egypt, while analysis provider MarineTraffic said the destination was unknown upon departure.

On 17 November, between 1:30 a.m. (UTC) and 11:19 a.m. the ship passed the Swedish island of Gotland. Yi Peng 3 crossed BCS East-West. At around 10 a.m., the Lithuanian telecom provider Telia in Vilnius received a fault report: the connection between Šventoji, Lithuania, and Gotland, Sweden had been severed. The ship crossed several times over the position of damage of the two cables. Yi Peng 3 continued its journey south. After Gotland, the freighter switched off its automatic identification system (AIS) signal for 7.5 hours. At 22:41 (UTC) the ship switched AIS back on and was located south of the Swedish island of Öland.

At 2 a.m. (UTC) on 18 November, the Finnish network provider Cinia reported a loss of data traffic via C-Lion1. It became clear that the cable between Gotland and Öland was damaged. In this area Yi Peng 3 was traveling without an AIS signal. The Danish public broadcaster DR sent a drone to survey the ship, showing images of how one of Yi Peng 3's anchors had become mangled – according to NZZ an indication that the freighter could have destroyed the cables.

Investigators, quoted by The Wall Street Journal, suspected the crew of the ship had dropped one of its anchors while the engines still propelled the vessel forward, resulting in the anchor ploughing through the seabed over 100 miles (160 km) and cutting the cables. An anchor of the ship showed damage consistent with this idea. The report also stated that, though Chinese authorities were cooperating, investigators believe that Russian intelligence had induced the vessel's Chinese captain to drag its anchor in order to cut the cable, referencing encrypted communication relayed to Yi Peng 3 by Russian vessels on 21 November.

As a response to the theory published in The Wall Street Journal, naval journalist Tom Sharpe argued in The Daily Telegraph that this scenario was unlikely, since a normal anchor was too heavy and offered too much resistance to be dragged around at the seven knots speed Yi Peng 3 was travelling at the time, according to the AIS data. He suggested a falsification of the AIS data, the use of a different device to cut the cables or a scenario in which the Yi Peng 3 had nothing to do with the destroyed cables.

On 19 November 2024, after passing the Øresund, the ship contacted Danish authorities and requested to anchor in the Kattegat at the position, where it stayed for the next weeks, outside Denmark's Territorial waters but inside Denmark's economic zone. It was suspected of being involved in the sabotage. Therefore, investigators could have only boarded the vessel with Chinese approval. If Yi Peng 3 had continued its voyage, a Danish navy expert explained in an interview on 6 December, there would have been no legal basis for stopping it.

The detention of the Chinese vessel was the first enforcement action under the Convention for the Protection of Submarine Telegraph Cables since the Transatlantic cables incident of 1959.

From 20 November 2024, Yi Peng 3 was stationed at a sea position 56.41165°N 11.653553°E in the Kattegat off anchor and has been guarded by the Royal Danish Navy.

On 22 November, the German Coast Guard sent Bad Düben and the Swedish Coast Guard also sent Poseidon, one of its largest ships, joining the Danish patrol vessel HDMS Hvidbjørnen in monitoring Yi Peng 3 in Kattegat.

On 22 November, a ship from the Finnish Coast Guard, the Turva, a Swedish Coast Guard vessel and Bamberg from the German Federal Police arrived at the damaged site of the C-Lion1 undersea data cable to examine it using remotely operated vehicles from the Swedish military.

Press requests for updates with Danish, German and Swedish authorities did not produce any new findings, nor information was given with reference to ongoing investigations, as late as 15 December 2024, while Yi Peng 3 remained at the same position.

On 17 December 2024 the Russian Navy Sea rescue tug Yevgeniy Churov was reported to have approached the anchored Yi Peng 3, passing it at very low speed and with its own AIS transmitter turned off.

On 18 December 2024 Chinese authorities allowed German and Swedish investigators to board Yi Peng 3, but the mission was postponed due to bad weather. Finally, on 19 December 14 Chinese, 9 Germans, 6 Swedes, 3 investigators from Finland and one Dane boarded the vessel. The Chinese investigation team, accompanied by the western observers, questioned the crew, inspected relevant pieces of equipment and reviewed documents. The operation lasted for five hours. The Chinese representatives did not permit access for Henrik Söderman, the Swedish public prosecutor, according to the Swedish authorities. The Swedish government had put pressure on Chinese authorities for the ship to move from international waters into Swedish territory to allow a full investigation. The Swedish Police and Swedish Accident Investigation Authority participated, conducting interviews with crew members and technical examinations, including of the anchoring equipment. Jonas Bäckstrand, Deputy Director General of the Swedish Accident Investigation Authority, noted that significant observations were made, though details remain undisclosed. On 23 December, Swedish foreign minister Maria Malmer Stenergard said that China had refused to permit Swedish prosecutors to board the vessel.

On 21 December 2024 Danish authorities reported the ship had weighed anchor and continued its voyage. A Swedish Coast Guard statement said the Yi Peng 3 did so on its own initiative, with the given destination being Port Said in Egypt.

== Investigations ==
The Swedish Prosecution Authority opened an investigation into "sabotage" regarding the disruptions of the two BCS East-West Interlink and C-Lion1 cables. According to the Swedish Navy, it had an "almost 100% identification" of the ships that were in the area of the two cable breaks. The navy is using a remote-controlled submarine to investigate the southern site of the two cables to support the Swedish prosecutor and police with their investigations.

Lithuania's Prosecutor General's Office launched a pre-trial investigation into terrorism.

On 20 November, Keskusrikospoliisi (KRP), Finland's national bureau of investigation, opened a criminal investigation into the rupture of the C-Lion1 cable on suspicion of "aggravated criminal mischief and aggravated interference with communications." On 26 November, the three nations signed an agreement to proceed with a joint investigation, coordinated through the Eurojust.

Following the allegations of sabotage by Yi Peng 3, Sweden asked China to cooperate with the Swedish authorities on the case, according to Prime Minister Ulf Kristersson, who emphasized that there was no "accusation" of any sort. Under the flag state principle, China has jurisdiction over Yi Peng 3 and ultimately determines any necessary investigations or prosecutions. Despite the presence of Danish, Swedish, and German patrols observing the vessel since 19 November, maritime law requires China's consent for any significant legal actions to be taken. China agreed on 29 November 2024 to cooperate in the investigation. China was ready to "work with relevant countries to find out the truth," said Mao Ning, the Foreign Ministry spokeswoman. China and Sweden were in close contact on the matter, she added. On 19 December, representatives from Sweden, Germany, Finland, and Denmark were invited by Chinese authorities to board the vessel as observers during a Chinese-led investigation. While Swedish prosecutors leading a separate European investigation were not permitted to board, Sweden's accident investigation authorities were invited to board. Jonas Backstrand, chair of Sweden's accident investigation authority, stated: "We are content with the visit onboard, which was relatively open and transparent, and we had the possibility to see what we wanted to see and to talk to the crew members that we wanted to talk with."

European authorities have not ruled out sabotage while U.S. intelligence officials assessed that "the cables were not cut deliberately".

== See also ==
- 2008 submarine cable disruption
- 2011 submarine cable disruption
- Nord Stream pipelines sabotage
- 2023 EE-S1 cable damage
- 2023 Balticconnector damage incident
- 2024 C-Lion1 incident
- 2024 Estlink 2 incident
- 2024 Ursa Major incident
- 2025 Russian railway sabotage in Poland
- Nordic Warden
- Russian hybrid warfare
- Russian sabotage operations in Europe
- Russian shadow fleet
- Severing of the Svalbard undersea cable
