= Russian hybrid warfare =

Russian efforts to destabilize countries

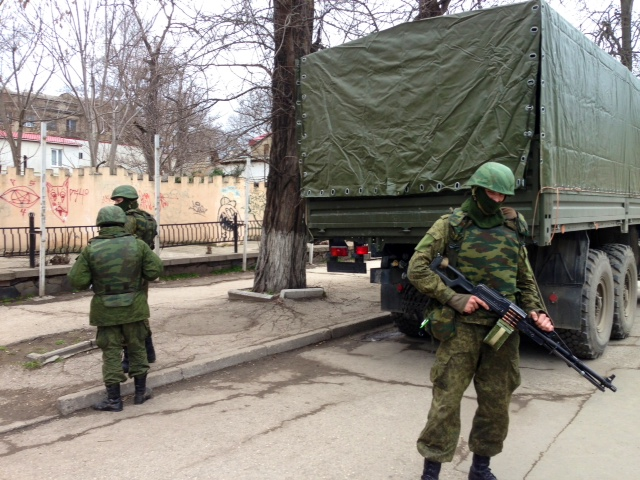
Soldiers without insignia in Crimea, 2014, referred to as "little green men"

Under president Vladimir Putin, Russia has used hybrid warfare to foster instability in other countries. Examples of Russian hybrid warfare include grey zone attacks, such as the use of unmarked soldiers, sabotage, assassinations, airspace incursions, and cyberattacks. It also involves disinformation campaigns, election interference, and fostering illegal immigration into the target countries. Following the 2022 Russian invasion of Ukraine, reports of Russian hybrid warfare against Europe have increased significantly, and there is reported to be ongoing campaign of Russian sabotage operations in Europe and assassination plots.

== 2014–2022 ==
Russian hybrid efforts preceding the full-scale 2022 Russian invasion of Ukraine include using soldiers without insignia called "little green men" to annex Crimea in 2014, and the broad disinformation campaigns targeting the 2016 US election and Brexit referendum. In October 2026, the British prime minister Andy Burnham confirmed there was Kremlin involvement in Brexit.

The passage of the Russian Northern Fleet, led by the aircraft carrier Admiral Kutznezov and the battlecruiser cruiser Piotr Veliky, on their way to support Syrian government forces around Aleppo on 21 October 2016 was part of Russia's "Heavy Metal Diplomacy" within the context of hybrid warfare.

== 2022–present ==
On 24 February 2022, Russian president Vladimir Putin ordered the beginning of a large-scale invasion of Ukraine. Since then, there have been many incidents in Europe linked to Russian hybrid warfare.

Western sources have accused Russia of being responsible for the Nord Stream pipelines sabotage in September 2022.

In May 2024, the Ministry of Foreign Affairs of Estonia summoned the Russian embassy chief after flights by a Finnish airline to eastern Estonia were paused due to GPS disturbances suspected to be caused by Russia. Since the beginning of the 2022 Russian invasion of Ukraine, almost all airlines flying over the Baltics have experienced navigation problems. Aside from signal jamming, other forms of Russian hybrid aggression against countries like Finland, Poland, and Sweden described are violations of territorial waters and airspace, and encouraging or permitting migrants from third countries to arrive at borders in large numbers through Russia and Belarus.

In October 2024, the head of MI5 Ken McCallum warned that Russian military intelligence were active in a campaign to "generate mayhem" on European and British streets using proxies that "further reduces the professionalism of their operations". The same month, Polish Prime Minister Donald Tusk accused Russia and Belarus of aiding illegal immigration into Europe in an effort to destabilize the European Union.

In October 2025, French intelligence services said that an instance of Holocaust Memorial vandalism committed in May 2024 in Paris by four Bulgarian nationals was linked to a long-term strategy by Russia to use paid proxies to sow division, spread false information and stoke social tensions.

In December 2025, Lithuania declared a state of emergency after several hundred balloons launched from Belarus as part of Russia's hybrid campaign caused both civil aviation disruptions and raised concern over national security, with senior Lithuanian officials reporting that they could be used to probe for air-defence gaps. In January 2026, Lithuanian prosecutors accused six foreign nationals of planning a terrorist attack in September 2024 targeting a private military supplier supporting Ukraine. The prosecutors said that their activities may have been coordinated from Russia by Colombian and Cuban nationals linked with the Russian GRU.

In February 2026, the Swedish Armed Forces identified a drone that was jammed after it was seen near the French aircraft carrier Charles de Gaulle as Russian, saying it had taken off from a nearby Russian spy ship. The carrier was docked in Malmö and due to take part in NATO exercises seen as a response to a long period of Russian hybrid warfare.

In March 2026, Petr Mlejnek, former head of the Security Information Service, said that he suspected Russia of being behind an arson that took place at a Pardubice arms factory.

On 10 August 2026, the Swedish Security Service (SÄPO) said it had shut down a Russian spying operation directed by Russia's Foreign Intelligence Service that had attempted to influence Swedish decision-making as well as discredit Sweden and its allies. SÄPO said that the operation involved three people working under the cover of diplomatic immunity. Also on 10 August, the Russian outlet Proekt reported that at least 21 out of the 117 Russian diplomats working at the Russian embassy in Vienna are linked with Russian intelligence.

On 13 August 2026, Tusk said that a Russian citizen had been detained in Poland after being accused of planning to assassinate a dual US-Ukrainian citizen on behalf of Russian intelligence. Tusk said it was the first case of Russia attacking an American citizen on NATO territory, and described the situation as part of Russia's broader hybrid campaign against western nations supporting Ukraine.

On 25 August 2026, Slovak police said it had arrested three foreign nationals whose identities have not been disclosed over a foiled plan to set a drone manufacturing plant on fire. According to TVP World, concerns were raised over possible Russian involvement due to a series of recent incidents targeting defense companies in Europe.

On 26 August 2026, ABC News reported that it had been told by a U.S. intelligence source that an explosive drone which was found on 5 August near a Ukrainian aircraft at Leipzig/Halle Airport, Germany, was similar to ones typically used by the Russian GRU, both in terms of explosives and the structure of the device. German authorities investigated and formally blamed Russia for the attack.

On 15 September 2026, the United States Department of Justice accused Russian agents of trying to recruit foreigners, including U.S.-based individuals, to assassinate individuals who are perceived to support Ukraine. Five men allegedly connected to Russia's Foreign Intelligence Service were charged with participating in a conspiracy to finance terrorism. On 23 September, the Polish military reported that a Russian military helicopter had violated NATO airspace north of Braniewo, close to Poland's border with the Russian Kaliningrad exclave. Tusk also warned against potential Russian ″hybrid drone and missile strikes″ against Poland and other NATO members, which Russia would portray as accidental.

In October 2026, it was reported that around 20 Finnish members of parliament had experienced break-ins into their homes, with one of them finding faeces left in their bathroom. According to senior MP Ben Zyskowicz, the incidents were part of a Russian plot to intimidate Finnish legislators. According to The Telegraph, breaking into homes have long been a tactic for Russian intelligence, with the United States Department of State also describing cases of moving personal items, setting alarms and opening windows to demoralize and intimidate targets.

On 28 October 2026, The Insider reported that members of ″The Daltonlar″, a Turkish criminal group, were suspected to be involved in carrying out sabotage in Europe on behalf of Russia. Polish authorities requested the detainment of two Turkish nationals in Germany connected to the gang, suspecting them to have been involved in the arson of a Starlink station in Poland.

In November 2026, the Polish newspaper Rzeczpospolita reported that the Russian GRU had plotted a false flag attack on the Polish border to Kaliningrad and a ″facility″ in the latter, drawing comparisons to Nazi Germany's Gleiwitz false flag attack. According to the report, the attack would have resulted in a ″large number″ of Russian casualties, while blame was going to be pinned on Ukraine to undermine NATO aid.

=== Baltic underwater cable sabotage ===
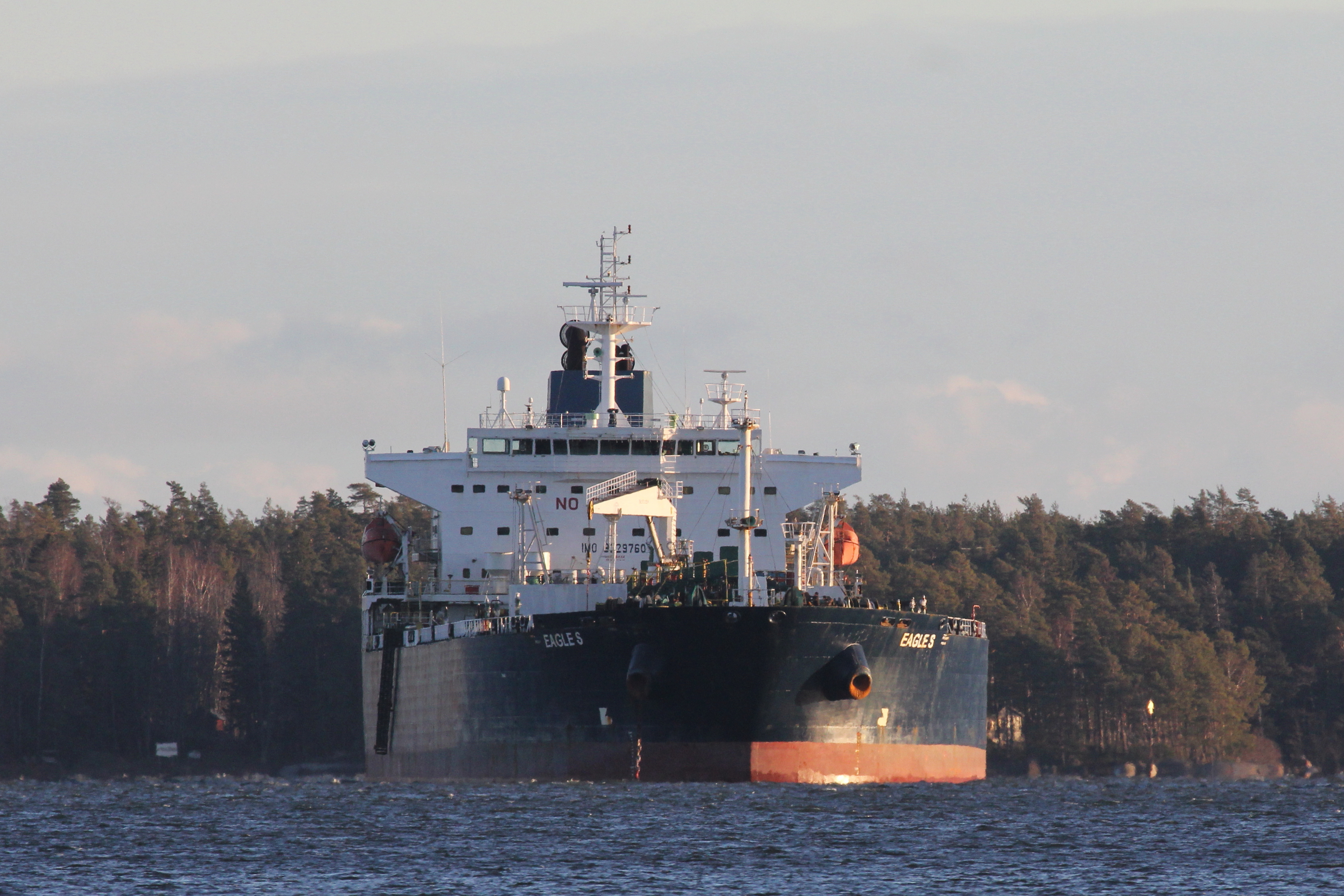
The crude oil tanker Eagle S, a ship connected with the Russian shadow fleet suspected of carrying out sabotage in the Baltic Sea

In November 2024, amidst intensifying Russian hybrid warfare efforts in Europe, two Submarine communications cables in the Baltic Sea were damaged in another instance of suspected Russian sabotage. The Chinese-flagged ship Yi Peng 3 was allegedly captained by a Russian as it passed the two cables at approximately the same time as each was cut. The deputy head of NATO's Allied Maritime Command had earlier in the year said that Russia and other malicious actors were targeting the vulnerable and extensive piped and underwater cables connecting Europe's energy and communications networks.

In December 2024, an underwater power cable between Estonia and Finland was damaged on Christmas Day in Finnish waters. Finnish authorities placed a tanker ship named Eagle S at the center of its investigation into the incident being sabotage. The Finnish Customs Service said that the ship is part of the Russian shadow fleet. According to MarineTraffic, the ship was on its way from Saint Petersburg to Egypt, but slowed in the vicinity of the underwater cables. The Finnish Border Guard inspected the ship and said that the ship's anchors were missing, the suspicion being that the ship cut the cables by dragging its anchors over them.

=== Use of religious institutions ===
The Russian Orthodox Church has been described as one strand in Russian covert operational activity against European states that support Ukraine. In 2024, the Swedish Security Service concluded that a recently consecrated Russian Orthodox church built in Västerås was linked to Russian intelligence operations, adding that the Putin regime uses the Russian Orthodox Church in Sweden as a platform for such operations. The church is located near critical national infrastructure and an airport used for Swedish military exercises.

In January 2026, according to Swedish media, several churches in Sweden may have been used to host fundraisers linked to the Belarusian St. Elizabeth Monastery, suspected of having ties to Russian military intelligence and supporting Russia's invasion of Ukraine. Women from the convent were allowed to set up a sales table at the parish of Täby with approval from the local priest, and the Church of Sweden later issued an official warning, saying that the collected funds could be used to support Russia's military aggression against Ukraine. The women were dubbed ″Z-nuns″ because of images of them displaying the pro-war Russian ″Z″ symbol, and visiting Russian-occupied territories in Ukraine. The Church of Sweden said that the case fits into a broader Russian pattern of attempting to influence public institutions and religious organizations across Europe, and also noted the Russian Orthodox Church seeking access to premises located near military facilities and airports.

=== Space and satellite activities ===
European security officials and independent satellite-tracking analysts have reported suspected Russian intelligence operations involving spacecraft conducting close-proximity manoeuvres near European geostationary communications satellites. Since the early 2020s, Russian satellites identified as part of the Russian Luch programme have repeatedly approached and remained near commercial and government satellites serving Europe, the Middle East and Africa. Analysts assess that these manoeuvres are consistent with signals intelligence collection, as the spacecraft position themselves within the transmission beams linking satellites to ground stations.

Officials have warned that such activity could expose unencrypted command or telemetry data used by older satellites, potentially enabling future interference. While the Russian spacecraft are not believed to possess the capability to directly disable or destroy satellites, experts caution that the intelligence gathered could support electronic warfare, spoofing of satellite commands, or coordinated cyber and ground-based jamming operations.

In June 2026, Gizmodo said a team of researchers noticed a pattern that had been occurring over the past seven years where a sudden drop in signal strength occurred simultaneously throughout Europe, the team had documented 75 days where this had occurred. After investigating, the researchers traced the disruptions to a constellation of Russian satellites that may be jamming the signals on purpose.

A specific case of interference was confirmed in October 2026, when Major General Michael Traut, chief of the German Space Command, disclosed that back in May a cluster of four Russian spacecraft, identified as Cosmos 2610 through 2613, had shadowed and closed in on a radar-imaging satellite operated by Finland-based ICEYE. This Finnish satellite provided critical battlefield intelligence and data to the United States and its allies, including support for Ukraine. Out of this group of six Russian satellites (Cosmos 2609, 2610, 2611, 2612, 2613 and 2614), which had been launched into Low Earth Orbit in April 2026, Cosmos 2612 initiated a set of maneuvers, beginning on 30 September 2026, which brought it into coplanar alignment with ICEYE-X36 and to a distance closer than 2000 meters by 19 October.

=== Sabotage and provocation campaign in the UK ===
In June 2026, the BBC said it had identified evidence that Evgeny Lyukshin, the son of a senior Russian official, had acted as the handler directing crimes in the UK, where individuals were recruited on Telegram to perform criminal acts in exchange for payment. The orders included arson attacks on Prime Minister Keir Starmer's house, for which one Ukrainian national and one Ukrainian-born Romanian national were convicted of conspiring to commit arson. Messages sent by Lyukshin showed him glorifying Vladimir Putin and offering Russian citizenship in return for more attacks.

The BBC also said it found that Russian operatives were responsible for setting up fake online UK far-right and Muslim groups, used to organize vandalism and stir up fear and division. Russia-based accounts were used to post lies about the motive for the arson attacks, which were further promoted by far-right figures such as Tommy Robinson.

=== Cyberattacks on European infrastructure ===
Also in February 2026, a denial-of-service attack was conducted on the Swedish forum Flashback, which Bahnhof CEO Jon Karlung said had been launched by the Russian hacker group ″No names″. Karlung called it ″an attack on democracy″ and a matter of national security. In April 2026, Swedish Civil Defense Minister Carl-Oskar Bohlin said that Russia-linked hackers were increasing cyberattacks on critical European infrastructure, saying pro-Russian groups were switching from denial-of-service attacks to more aggressive and destructive attacks. He said a group linked to Russian intelligence targeted a Swedish heating plant in spring 2025, which was stopped by the security systems at the facility, adding that Norway and Denmark have faced similar challenges. A group tied to Russian intelligence was also accused of carrying out a large attempted attack on Poland's power grid in December 2025.

In July 2026, France published a report documenting the cyber targeting of French entities by the Russian FSB, formally accusing Russia of espionage. According to the report, Russia has operated a modus operandi called ″Turla″ since at least 2004, targeting France since the 2010s, and has compromised numerous entities, including the French embassy in Moscow, email accounts of high ranking military personnel, and the justice sector. The same month, The Telegraph said that Russia recruited criminal groups and proxies are believed to be involved in cyberattacks across the UK.

In September 2026, Ukrainian authorities said pro Russian hackers were behind a cyberattack on Norway, which disrupted services for several days. Norway did not confirm the perpetrators of the attack, while the Russian hacker group ″Server Killers″ said it had declared ″cyber war″ on Norway for supporting Ukraine.

In November 2026, officials throughout Europe reported a new wave of bomb threats against several planes and media outlets, and schools with European governments and officials pointing to a possible Russian-backed hybrid operation.

== International reactions ==
On 2 May 2024, the North Atlantic Council of NATO said that members of the alliance were "deeply concerned" by activities attributed to Russia on NATO territory, citing investigations resulting in the charging of multiple individuals connected to "hostile state activity". NATO Secretary General Jens Stoltenberg said that actions such as sabotage, disinformation, acts of violence, and cyber and electronic interference would not "deter us from supporting Ukraine".

German intelligence chief Bruno Kahl said in November 2024 that Russia's extensive use of hybrid warfare "increases the risk that NATO will eventually consider invoking its Article 5 mutual defence clause".

The Baltic States have been among the biggest advocates in NATO for the alliance taking steps to counter the Russian threat, with many believing that with the increased Russian hybrid attacks, NATO's eastern flank will be the next to be targeted if Russia wins in Ukraine. Following damage to underwater cables between Estonia and Finland in December 2024 suspected to have been caused by a ship part of the Russian shadow fleet, Estonian Foreign Minister Margus Tsahkna said that the incident must be regarded as an attack against "vital infrastructure", adding that the shadow fleet is a threat to security in the Baltic.

On 22 October 2024, the Polish Minister of Foreign Affairs, Radosław Sikorski, withdrew consent to the functioning of the Russian consulate in Poznań, citing Russian hybrid warfare targeting Poland and its allies, including cyberattacks and assaults at Poland's eastern border, which is also the border of the Schengen Area.

In March 2025, UK officials at a Defence Committee evidence session urged for stronger deterrence against hybrid threats, with the Director General of Security Policy at the Ministry of Defence, Paul Wyatt, noting adversaries seeking to do harm in a "manner they judge is below the Article 5 threshold". The annual NATO Hybrid Symposium convened in Bucharest, Romania, on October 15-16, 2026, bringing together delegates from NATO member states, partner nations, the European Union, and the industrial sector to address ongoing security challenges. The agenda centered on reviewing recent hybrid incidents attributed to Russia, such as cyber operations, infrastructure disruptions, and airspace incursions, and evaluating coordinated defensive measures. Sessions emphasized safeguarding critical energy infrastructure, exchanging operational insights, and expanding public-private partnerships.

During the opening address, NATO Assistant Secretary General Jean Charles Ellermann-Kingombe outlined the Alliance's preparedness and strategic resolve in maintaining deterrence and sustaining support for Ukraine. Additional perspectives and strategic frameworks were presented by delegations from the European Union, Ukraine, and Moldova. Co-hosted by the Romanian Ministry of Foreign Affairs and NATO's Cyber and Digital Transformation Division, alongside Romanian security and interior agencies, the event presented broader institutional initiatives focused on collective resilience and security preparedness.

== Russia's view on hybrid warfare ==
According to the Institute for the Study of War, Russia defines the concept of hybrid wars precisely as a type of war, rather than a set of means to conduct state policy. The Russian Armed Forces openly discuss ongoing conflicts as hybrid wars, and Russia sees hybrid wars as the future of military development.

== See also ==
- 2024 Baltic Sea submarine cable disruptions
- 2025 European drone sightings
- 2025 Russian drone incursion into Poland
- 2025 Russian railway sabotage in Poland
- 2026 drone incidents in Romania
- Øresund drone incident
- Russian disinformation
- Diplomatic expulsions during the Russo-Ukrainian War
- Russian interference in the 2024 United States elections
- Russian shadow fleet
- Russia–European Union relations
- Severing of the Svalbard undersea cable
- Transnational repression by Russia
- Violations of non-combatant airspaces during the Russian invasion of Ukraine
