= 2024 Estlink 2 incident =

Failure of Estlink 2 cable

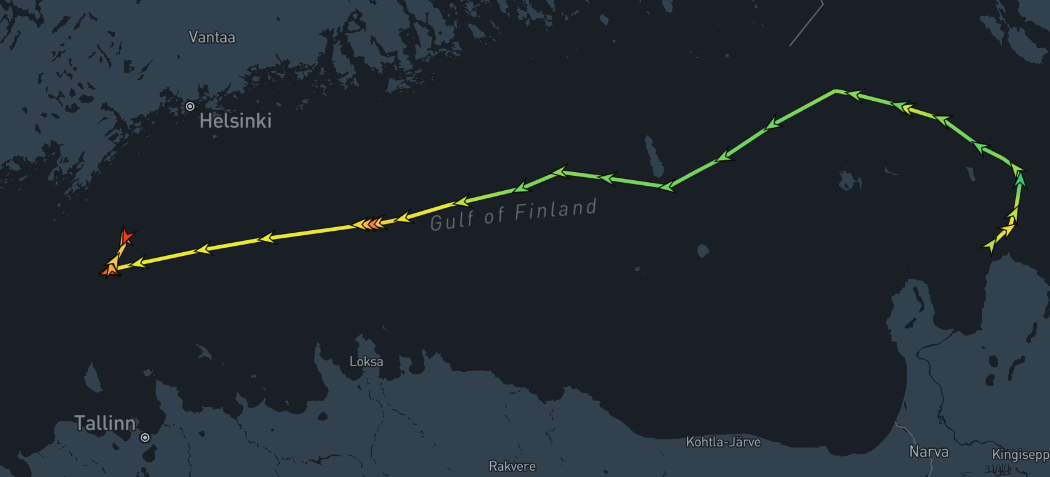
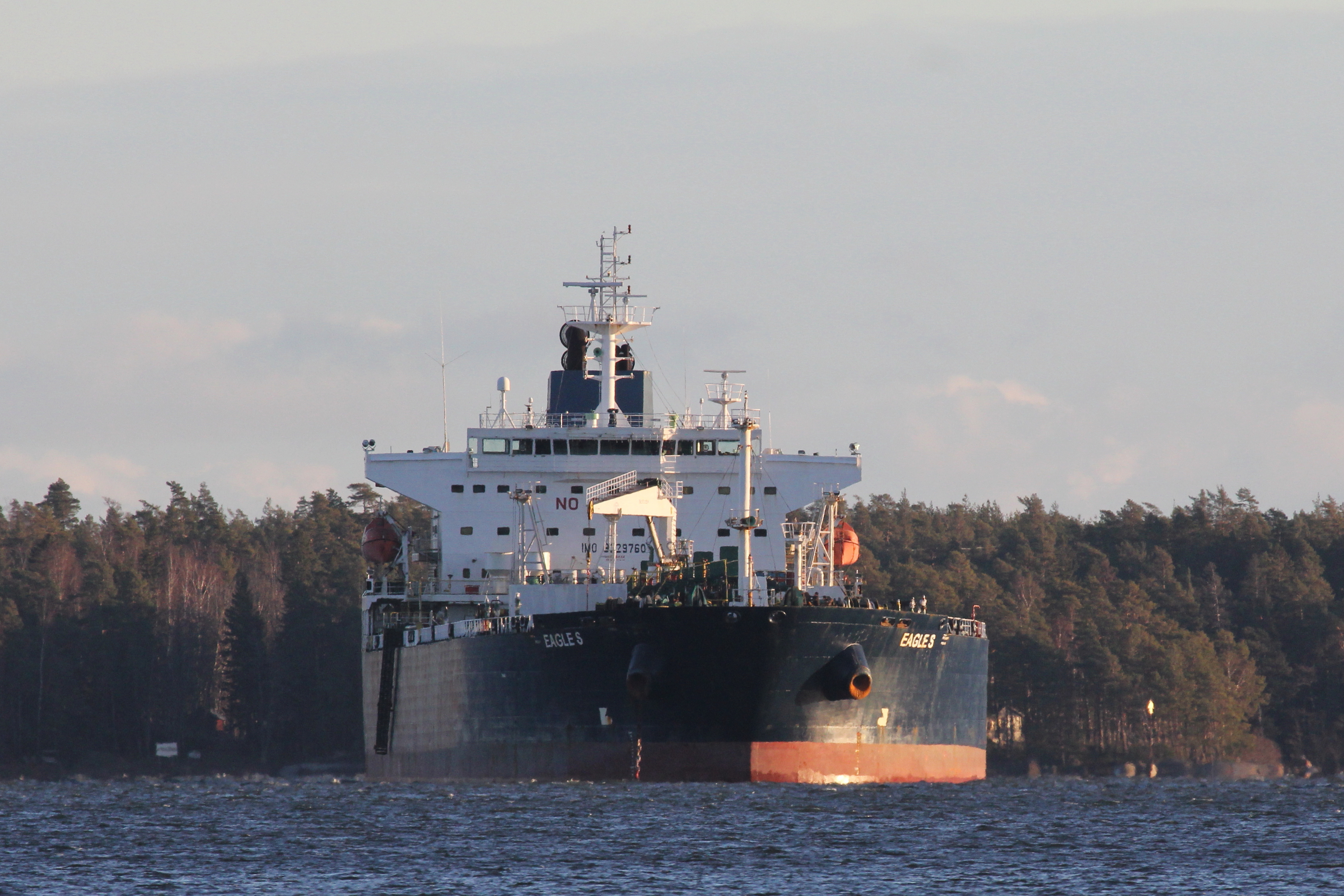
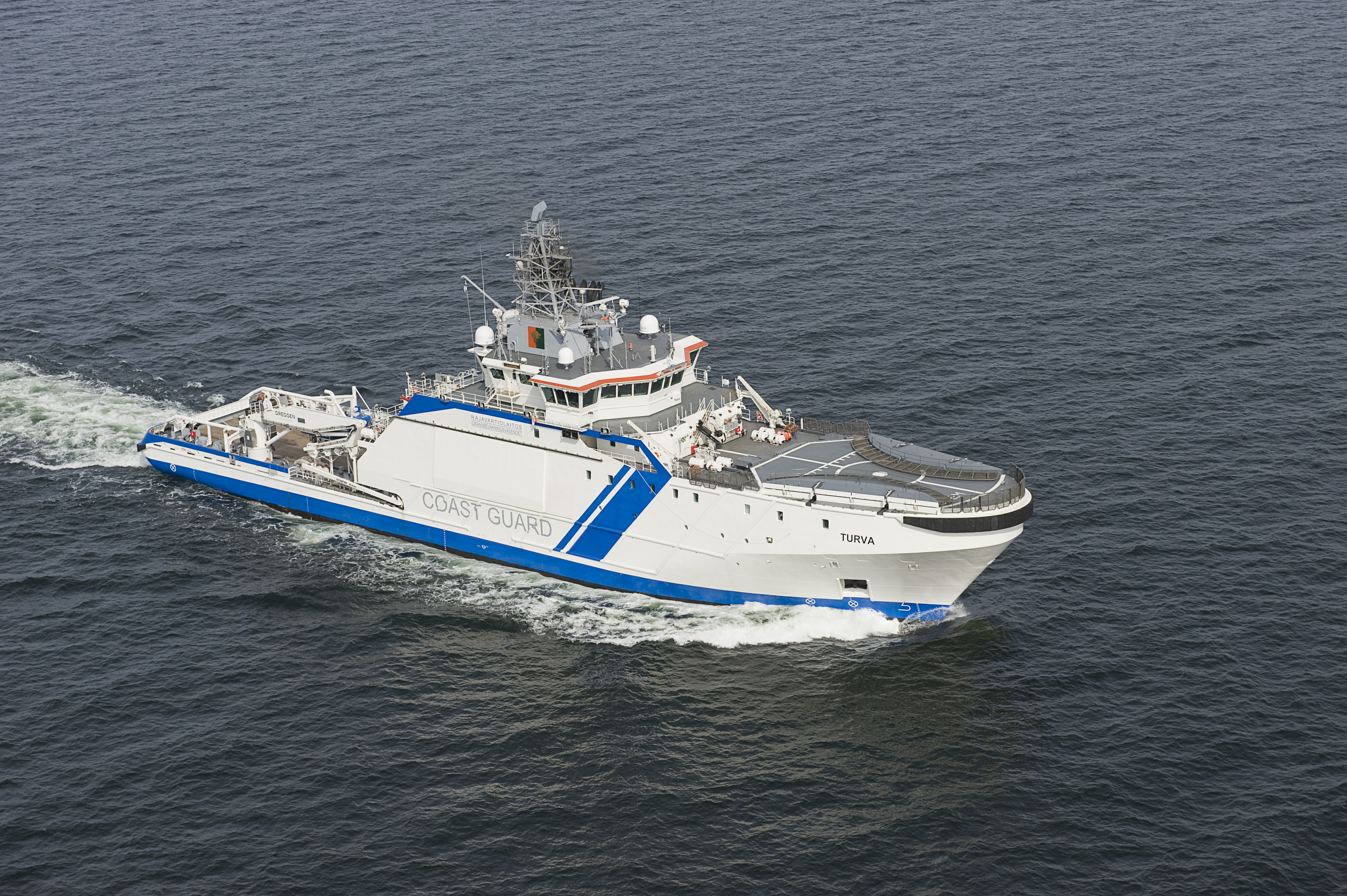
- Eagle S slowed significantly while passing Estlink 2. Eagle S Patrol vessel Turva
- Date: 25 December 2024
- Time: 12.26 (Eastern European Time)
- Location: Gulf of Finland, Baltic Sea
- Type: Maritime incident
- Cause: Under investigation; suspected sabotage
- Suspects: 8 crew members placed on travel bans

On 25 December 2024 at 12:26 EET, the Estlink 2 submarine power cable had an unplanned failure, reducing the Estonia–Finland cross-border capacity from 1,016 to 358 MW. Concerns about potential sabotage immediately arose due to other recent outages in the Baltic Sea region.

On the evening of the same day authorities were informed of disruptions to four telecommunications cables. Two cables belonging to the Finnish telecommunications company Elisa had been completely severed until Elisa finished their repairs on 6 January 2025. Repairs to the power cable itself are expected to take months and cost tens of millions of euros.

Finnish authorities are investigating the incident and suspect that the oil tanker Eagle S, believed to be part of the Russian shadow fleet, had intentionally caused the cable ruptures by dragging its anchor. The ship is being suspected of aggravated vandalism, an aggravated regulatory offense and aggravated communication interference.

== Incident ==
On the early morning of 25 December 2024, the oil tanker Eagle S managed by Peninsular Maritime India left the port of Ust-Luga in Russia with a load of unleaded gasoline. It was destined for Aliağa, Turkey. (Other sources say Port Said, Egypt.) The captain was a 39-year-old Georgian national, who had joined the crew in October.

At 10:26 GMT, Eagle S crossed the Estlink 2 submarine cable under the Gulf of Finland. A power outage on the cable was reported by the Finnish electricity transmission grid operator Fingrid at the same time.

At 1:50 p.m. local time the Eagle S made a U-turn back towards Russia, approximately half an hour after having crossed over EST 2; she returned to her original course at approximately 2:20 p.m.

== Seizure ==
By early evening of 25 December, the Finnish Border Guard's offshore patrol vessel Turva was escorting Eagle S to the Porkkalanniemi peninsula. The anchors were not in place on the vessel, and at 00:28 on the 26th, the Police Rapid Response Unit Karhu and the Special Intervention Unit of the Gulf of Finland Coast Guard District boarded the ship in Finnish territorial waters using two helicopters provided by the Finnish Defence Forces and the Finnish Border Guard. The authorities were armed and prepared for resistance, but there was none and the authorities quickly took control of the vessel. The authorities asked Eagle S to raise her anchor, but only the anchor chain rose to the surface. The police took the ship into their possession.

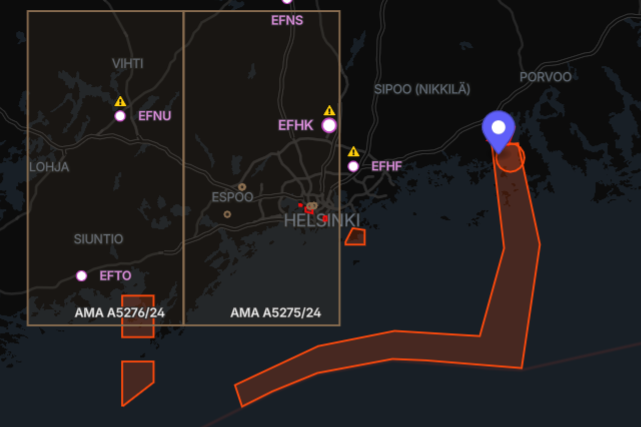
Flight bans were instated to the route from Porkkalanniemi to Porvoo. Svartbäck highlighted with blue and bans with red.

On 27 December, Eagle S and Turva were still near Porkkalanniemi. On the morning of 28 December, Turva left Eagle S and the Finnish tugboat M/S Ukko arrived. According to the police, the ship will be moved to the Svartbäck inner anchorage, near the Port of Kilpilahti in Porvoo. Flight bans have been instated to the route and Svartbäck. The tugboat is a few hundred meters away from the tanker, monitoring the situation. Before 17:00 it was reported that the transfer had gone according to plan.

On 30 December, an application was filed to the Helsinki District Court, in which the Eagle S's shipping company, Caravella, seeks to overturn the seizure by the Finnish authorities. Lawyer Herman Ljungberg, representing the entire crew of the ship, strongly criticised the actions of the authorities to Helsingin Sanomat based on his conversation with the ship's captain. Ljungberg claims that, according to the captain, the situation is stressful and the crew is starving. (Note: Nähdä nälkää, literally "see hunger") He said that "the crew has been interrogated without legal assistance, kept hungry and in one room, and not allowed to sleep”. The allegations have been denied by the police. Ljunberg's application will be heard on an oral hearing on the 3rd of January.

On 2 January the Finnish newspaper Helsingin Sanomat reached the ship's captain via telephone. When asked whether the crew members were okay, he responded with "yes, yes. This is just a normal marine incident. Nothing more, nothing special. We are cooperating well with the police".

== Investigation ==
Eagle S, registered in the Cook Islands, was not on the list of 79 ships sanctioned by the EU at the time of the incident; it was however believed to be part of the Russian shadow fleet. It is now under investigation, with Finnish authorities suspecting that her anchor was the cause of the cable's rupture.

The ship's crew of 24 comprises Georgian and Indian nationals. The nationality of her officers has not been announced. According to Sami Paila, Head of Investigation at the National Bureau of Investigation (NBI), some of the crew are suspects and some are witnesses, and no arrests have been made. According to Sami Rakshit head of the Finnish Customs, the case is also being investigated for a serious regulatory offense of evasion of sanctions imposed on Russia following its invasion of Ukraine, as the vessel was carrying 35,000 tons of unleaded gasoline. Furthermore, investigators found no valid insurance for the ship at the time of incident in the Indian Register of Shipping, with her last policy, with Ingosstrakh, having expired in August 2024. Finnish Custom will not pursue investigating possible charges on evading sanctions as the crew did not intentionally bring the sanctioned cargo into Finnish jurisdiction.

The police confirmed that the tanker is suspected of having caused the failure and that the incident is being investigated as an act of gross sabotage (criminal code fin. törkeä tuhotyö, swe. grovt sabotage) with a flight ban of three kilometers instated around the area to support the preliminary investigation. Chief of Police of Finland Ilkka Koskimäki said that there had not been any contact with Russia and there were no plans to do so.

On 29 December, the Helsinki Police Department reported that investigations are continuing, but adverse weather conditions at the anchorage have slowed down operations. A technical investigation and crew interrogations are still underway. Criminal inspector Sami Paila from the NBI said that "underwater investigations have so far mapped the drag track on the seabed from start to finish. The track is several tens of kilometers long. At that point of time the anchor was not found yet. The third criminal offence on the case is aggravated communication interference.

On 31 December, the NBI placed seven crew members suspected of crime to a travel ban - a "less severe measure of restraint than arrest and detention, imposed because the police have an interest in securing the preliminary investigation and ensuring that the parties involved remain reachable during the investigation". On 2 January it was reported that, an eighth member has been added to the list.

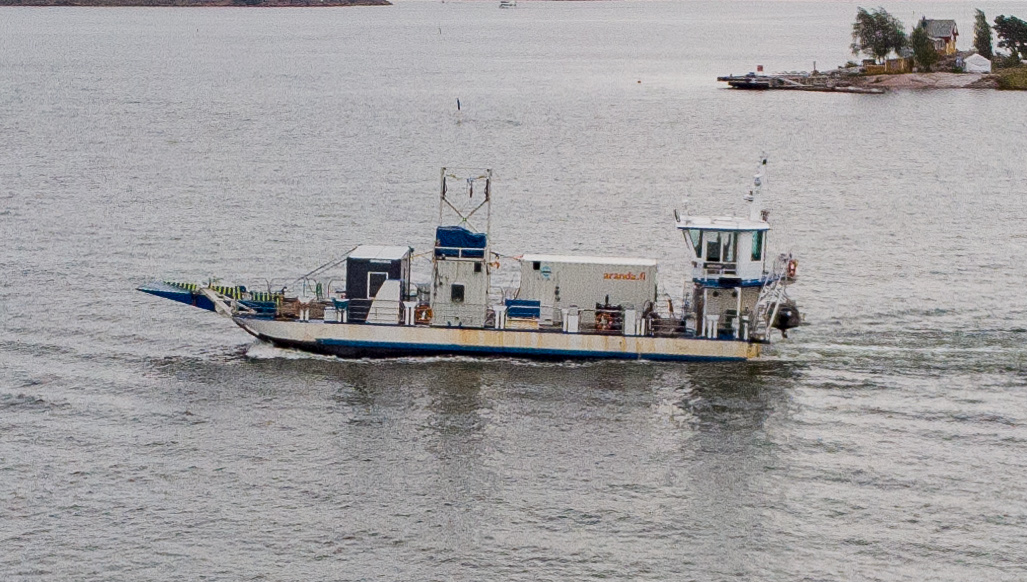
MS Hessu

On 2 January, authorities started a port state inspection on the tanker. Maintenance was also performed, with vessel MS Hessu collecting waste water and trash.

As of 3 January the Eagle S not only remained under detention by the criminal investigation (a court ruled) and port inspection, but civil litigation brought by Fingrid for the cost of repair of their submarine power cable.

The anchor of the ship was located near the end of the drag mark on the seafloor during the night between 5 and 6 January and was recovered on 7 January by the Swedish military vessel HSwMS Belos from a depth of about 80 metres (260 ft).

On 20 January 2025 the Washington Post cited anonymous US intelligence sources and equally anonymous sources from two unnamed European security services, who claimed that the recent cable cutting incidents were accidents, not deliberate acts ordered by Russian officials. The NBI lead investigator for the Eagle S case stated that he leaves the information in foreign newspapers to them, and that the NBI is investigating the crimes. Pekka Toveri, retired general and Member of the European Parliament, called the statements made in the Washington Post "total rubbish". On January 22, Sweden's SVT reported that most Nordic government branches dismiss the claims by Washington Post, with a Swedish consensus that it is too early to draw a conclusion while investigation proceeds. Jukka Savolainen, network director of the European Centre of Excellence for Countering Hybrid Threats, claimed that Washington Post spread pro-Russian fake news.

=== Alleged spying equipment ===
On 27 December, Lloyd's List reported that in June, they received over 60 documents about Eagle S from a source that wishes to remain anonymous. The source has since provided additional information, claiming that an unauthorised person has been identified on board during a prior voyage, "listening and recording equipment was brought on to the 20-year-old tanker via 'huge portable suitcases'" and that "the transmitting and receiving devices were used to record all radio frequencies, and upon reaching Russia were offloaded for analysis".

Author and historian Mikko Porvali considered the allegations about intelligence systems to be possible, although he pointed out that ships built for signals intelligence often have satellite antennas on their decks enclosed by what look like large golf balls which are easily noticeable rather than suitcases.

The NBI denied that equipment described by Lloyd's List were on board during its last voyage.

=== Charges and litigation ===
In August 2025, the captain and two officers from the Eagle S were charged in Finland for aggravated criminal damage and aggravated interference with telecommunications, as well as other charges. They pled not guilty and disputed Finland's jurisdiction. On 3 October 2025, the Helsinki District Court ruled that due to the circumstances of the crime and the provisions international law jurisdiction in this case belongs to the country where the ship is flagged or the home country of a defendant. As a result, the court dismissed the case. The deputy prosecutor general appealed the ruling to Helsinki Court of Appeals, which took the case up in January 2026 after granting leave for appeal.

== Impact ==
The Estonia–Finland cross-border capacity was reduced from 1,016 MW to 358 MW. Because electricity was flowing from Finland to Estonia at the time of the incident, and Estonia is a smaller country, prices were expected to drop slightly in Finland and rise significantly in Estonia. Eesti Energia is prepared to increase the prices of fixed electricity packages.

The damage was repaired in June 2025 and was estimated to have cost tens of millions of euros.

== Reactions ==
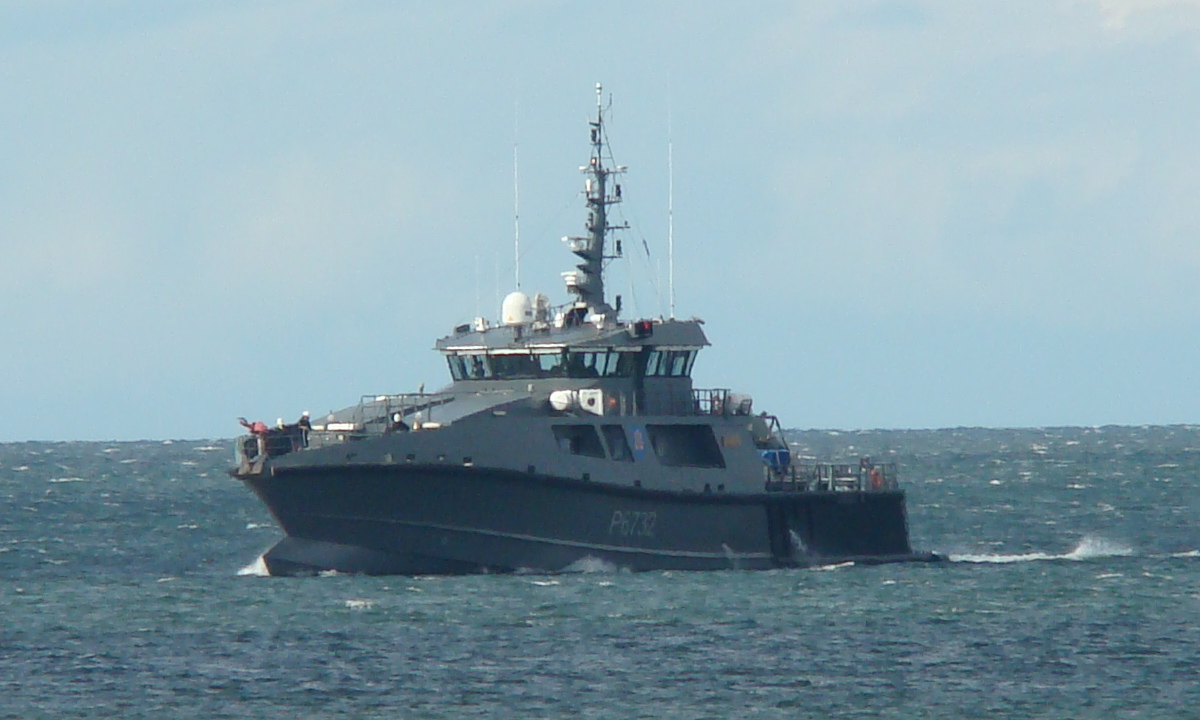
EML Raju

=== Estonia ===
Estonia's president Alar Karis said on X that "repeated damage to Baltic Sea infrastructure signals a systemic threat, not mere accidents." Prime minister Kristen Michal said at a news conference that the shadow tankers "are helping Russia to earn funds that will aid Russian hybrid attacks, and Defence Minister Hanno Pevkur announced on public radio that the patrol ship Raju had set sail on Tuesday (24 December) to protect Estlink 1.

=== Finland ===
Professor of criminal law Sakari Melander told Helsingin Sanomat, that "here it seems justified to consider the use of coercive measures. Arrest and imprisonment may be an option." Matti Tolvanen, professor emeritus of criminal and procedural law, said that if the ship is allowed to leave, there is little chance of the matter being taken to court or even investigated. A prosecutor has been assigned to handle the case.

=== European Union and NATO ===
Kaja Kallas, the foreign EU minister, stated that the incident was "the latest in a series of suspected attacks on critical infrastructure" and thanked Finnish authorities "for their swift action in boarding the suspected vessel".

Mark Rutte, the secretary general of NATO, discussed the incident with Finnish president Alexander Stubb and stated that NATO intends to increase its military presence in the Baltic Sea as a result of the incident.

Sweden sent its recovery vessel Belos to support the investigations.

=== Russia ===
The Kremlin did not comment on the issue. "I can't say anything for sure, it's a very narrow-profile question, which is hardly the prerogative of the presidential administration," Kremlin spokesman Dmitry Peskov said when asked by a Reuters journalist to comment on the actions of the Finnish authorities.

=== New Zealand ===
On 28 December 2024, New Zealand's Ministry of Foreign Affairs and Trade (MFAT) issued a statement that New Zealand was not responsible for the Cook Islands-registered Eagle S. The Cook Islands is an associated state of New Zealand; managing its own internal affairs while New Zealand manages its foreign affairs, disasters relief and defence. MFAT also stated that the New Zealand government had raised concerns with the Cook Islands government about its shipping registry being used to help Russia's shadow fleet circumvent international sanctions and aid its war on Ukraine. Following the Russian invasion of Ukraine in 2022, New Zealand had imposed sanctions on Russia. In late November 2024, Australia and New Zealand had endorsed a joint Call to Action against Russian and North Korean shadow fleet activity.

On 29 December, University of Waikato law professor Al Gillespie expressed concern that the alleged ship sabotage incident would create a "bad look" for New Zealand due to the association between the Cook Islands and New Zealand.

== See also ==
- 2024 Baltic Sea submarine cable disruptions
- 2025 Elisa data cable incident
- Balticconnector § 2023 damage incident — natural gas pipeline between Finland and Estonia damaged a year earlier
- Russian shadow fleet
