= 2025 Elisa data cable incident =

Baltic Sea submarine cable disruption

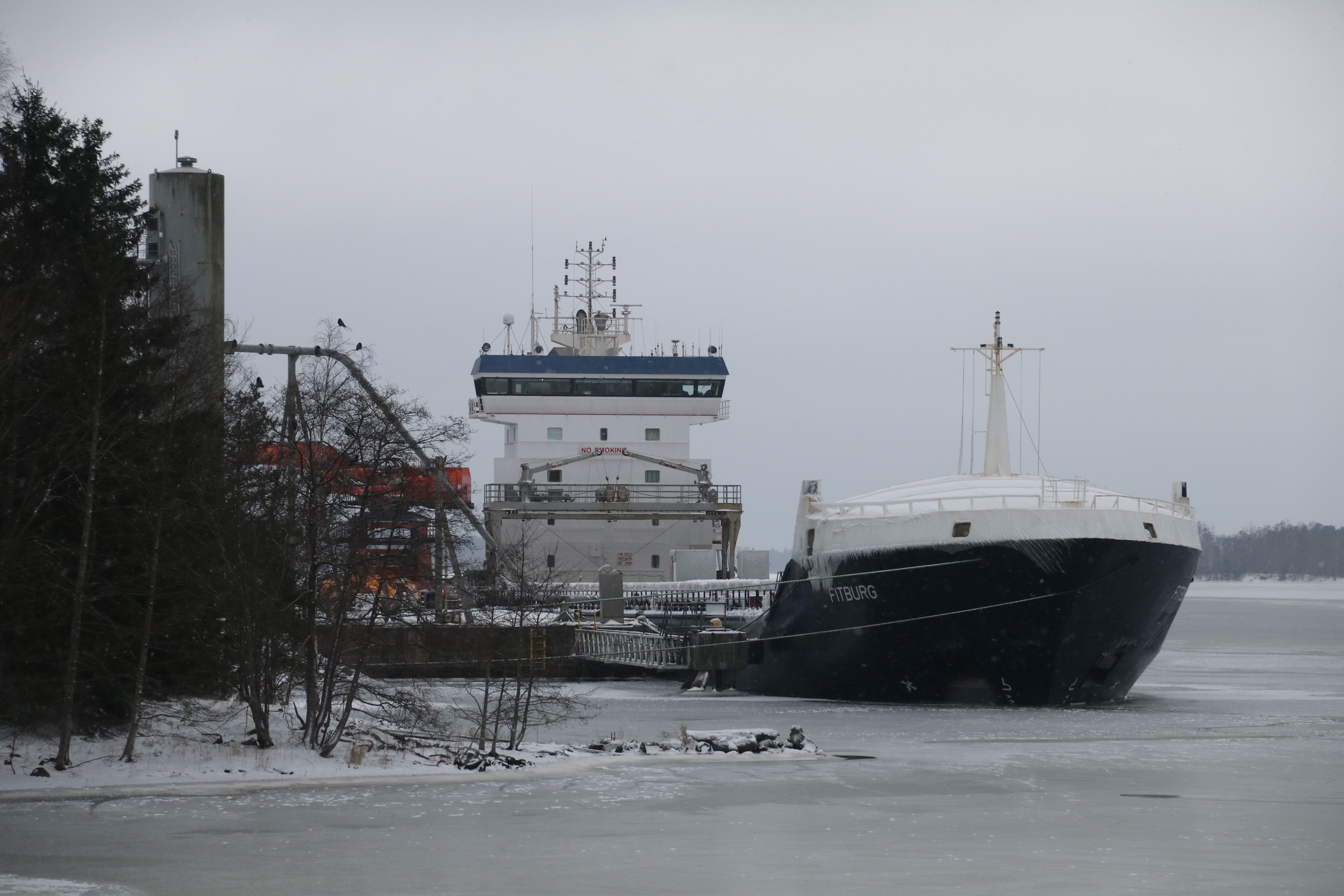
- Fitburg arrested in Kantvik harbour
- Date: 31 December 2025
- Time: 4:53 (Eastern European Time)
- Location: Gulf of Finland, Baltic Sea
- Type: Maritime incident
- Cause: Under investigation; suspected sabotage
- Arrests: 2 crew members
- Suspects: 14 crew members detained, of which 2 arrested and 2 travel banned
- Convicted: Andrei Maksimenko (captain); Vusal Majidov (boatswain)
- Convictions: Aggravated criminal sabotage
- Sentence: 3 years and 6 months' imprisonment (Maksimenko); 2 years and 10 months' imprisonment (Majidov)

On 31 December 2025 at 4:53 EET, Finnish telecommunication company Elisa noticed a disruption in a data cable connecting Finland and Estonia. Finnish police and coastguard approached the location in the Finnish exclusive economic zone and boarded the freighter Fitburg, which was found with its anchor lowered. The ship was traveling under the flag of Saint Vincent and the Grenadines and was, according to marine traffic website, en route from Saint Petersburg, Russia, to Haifa, Israel. The crew was detained and the ship was brought to the Finnish port of Kantvik, where it arrived at 17:00 EET. It was released on 12 January 2026. Four crewmembers had to stay in Finland while investigations continued.

On 5 November 2026, the captain and boatswain of the ship were jailed for 3 years and 6 months and 2 years and 10 months, respectively, by the Helsinki District Court.

== Incident ==
Finnish telecommuncation company Elisa noticed a problem with a cable by 4:53 EET. On the same day Finland's authorities were informed of disruptions in other telecommunications cables operated by telecommunication company Arelion in Estonia's economic zone.

== Seizure ==
At 07:34, authorities determined that a vessel's anchor chain was in the sea and the vessel was moving. Coastguard vessel Turva and a helicopter approached the location in the Finnish exclusive economic zone and boarded the 132-metre freighter Fitburg. 14 crew members were detained. The crew was composed of nationals from Russia, Georgia, Kazakhstan and Azerbaijan. The Finnish police did initially not comment on the nationality of the captain.

== Investigation ==
Deputy Prosecutor General Jukka Rappe told journalists on 31 December 2025 that he had ordered Finlands National Bureau of Investigation (NBI) to open a preliminary probe. The offences under investigation were reported on 1 January 2026 as aggravated interference with telecommunications, aggravated criminal damage and attempted aggravated criminal damage.

According to investigators, a Turkish company operated the Fitburg at the time of the incident. While searching the vessel, Finnish Customs officers found a load of Russian structural steel, a product sanctioned by the European Union. Customs initiated a preliminary inquiry into potential sanctions violation. On 1 January 2026, two crew members were arrested and two others were forbidden from leaving Finland. An underwater investigation of the site was also launched.

Der lachende Sägefisch – "The laughing Sawfish", a Nazi Germany emblem created by cartoonist Hans Kossatz.

On 2 January 2026, NBI announced that they had established a Joint Investigation Team with Estonia. At the same time, it was reported that the symbol of Nazi Germany's 9th U-boat Flotilla, a laughing sawfish, is painted to the ship's bridge for unclear reasons.

An initial investigation of the seabed had been done by 4 January. According to police sources a drag track was found, indicating that an anchor had been pulled over the bed for tens of kilometers.

By 7 January, the customs prosecutors had decided to drop the case of sanction violations, stating that the Fitburg was brought into Finnish waters at the request of Finnish authorities and did not intentionally bring the sanctioned goods into Finland.

On 12 January 2026, the investigations had reached a point where the Fitburg was allowed to leave Finland. From the 14 crew, four had to remain in Finland: one in custody, three restricted by a travel ban.

NBI stated in March 2026 that the cable was clearly damaged by the anchor of Fitburg in Estonia's exclusive economic zone.

On 5 November 2026, the Helsinki District Court sentenced the Russian captain of Fitburg, Andrei Maksimenko, to 3 years and 6 months in prison and the Azerbaijani boatswain, Vusal Majidov, to 2 years and 10 months in prison for aggravated criminal sabotage. The pair were also ordered to pay for the repairs to the cables. The court ruled that the captain and boatswain must have been aware that the anchor was lowered but continued sailing nonetheless. Both were ordered to be imprisoned immediately.

== See also ==
- 2024 Baltic Sea submarine cable disruptions
- 2024 Estlink 2 incident
- Baltic Sea Underwater Infrastructure Events
- Russian sabotage operations in Europe
