= C-Lion1 =

Submarine communications cable between Finland and Germany

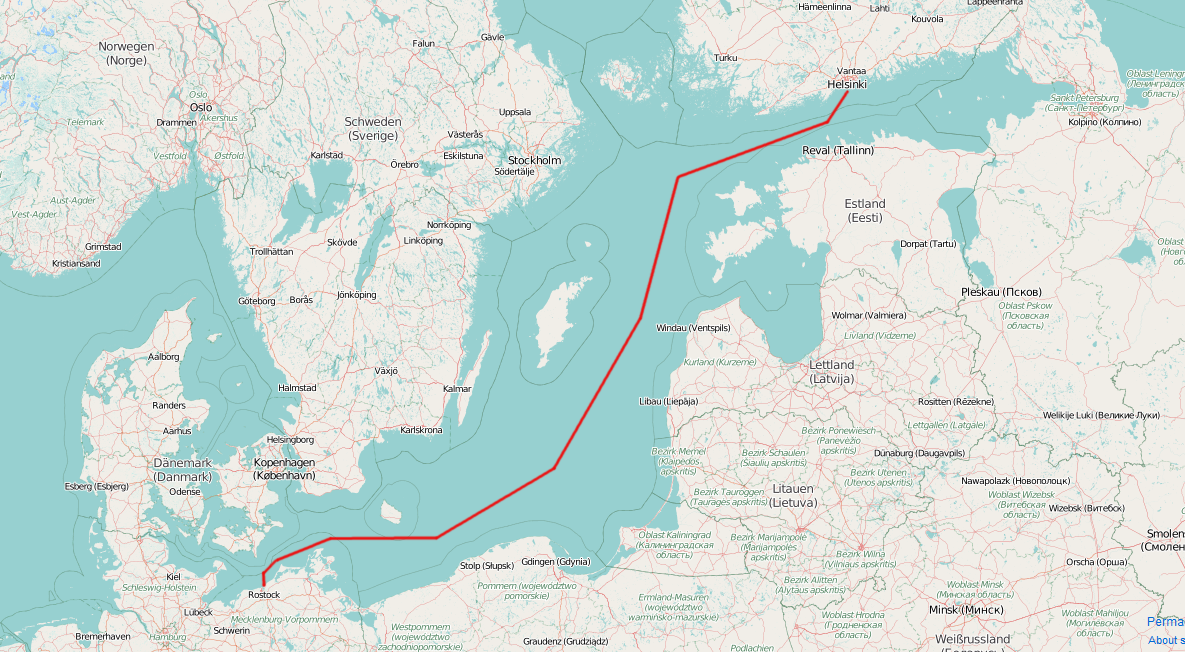
- Owners: Cinia Oy
- Landing points: 1. Hanko, Finland; 2. Helsinki, Finland; 3. Rostock, Germany
- Total length: 1,173 kilometres (729 mi)
- Design capacity: 120 Tbit/s
- Currently lit capacity: 144 Tbit/s

C-Lion1 is a submarine communications cable between Finland and Germany. The cable is owned and operated by the Finnish telecommunications and IT services company Cinia Oy. It is the first direct communications cable between Finland and Central Europe; previous connections have been through Sweden and Denmark.

The cable was damaged in November 2024, taking the cable offline between November 18 and November 28. Some officials suspect the damaging was an act of sabotage. The connection was offline again between December 25, 2024 and January 6, 2025 in connection with the 2024 Estlink 2 incident.

The cable is 1,173 kilometres (729 mi) long and has eight fiber pairs with a design capacity of 120 Tbit/s and a maximum capacity of 144 Tbit/s.

== History ==
Alcatel Submarine Networks commenced the installation of the cable in October 2015, completing the process in January 2016. The cable entered commercial operation in May 2016.

In October 2017, a network switch was installed to the Finnish port city of Hanko.

== Faults in 2024–2025 ==
A fault was detected in the cable on 18 November 2024, after which the services provided over the cable went down. According to the Finnish operating company 'Cinia Oy', the cable service was interrupted by a subsea physical force . The fault was discovered off the coast of the Swedish island of Öland.

German Federal Defense Minister Boris Pistorius called the incident an act of sabotage. As of 19 November 2024, the cause of the fault was being investigated.

The Lithuanian Naval Force announced increased surveillance of its waters in response to the damage and would discuss further measures with Lithuania's allies.

On 29 November 2024, the operator Cinia Oy announced that the cable had been completely repaired.

The cable was went offline again on December 25, 2024. The probable cause of the fault is considered to be a cable cut in the Gulf of Finland. The damage was repaired on January 6, 2025. Cinia Oy is demanding the seizure of the vessel Eagle S linked with the incident to secure its claims for compensation.

== Landings points ==
C-Lion1 has landing points in:

- Helsinki, Finland, at Santahamina
- Hanko, Finland
- Rostock, Germany

== See also ==
- Balticconnector § 2023 damage incident – a natural gas pipeline between Finland and Estonia that was damaged a year earlier
- Baltic Sea Underwater Infrastructure Events
