= Turva =

Finnish offshore patrol vessel

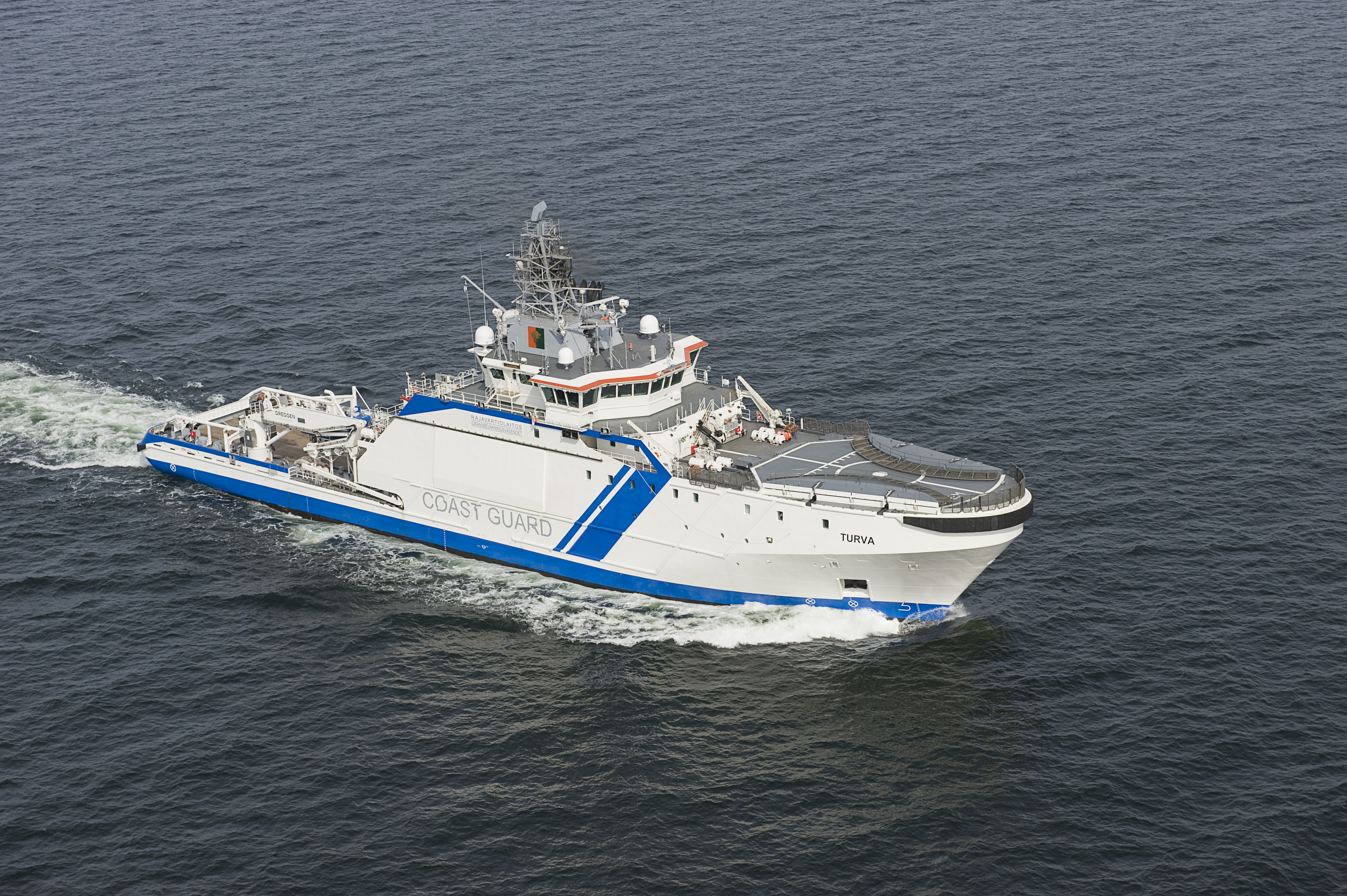

History

Finland
- Name: Turva
- Namesake: Finnish for "protection" or "security"
- Owner: Finnish Border Guard
- Ordered: 21 December 2011
- Builder: STX Finland Rauma shipyard, Finland
- Cost: € 97 million (US$135 million; FY 2011)
- Yard number: 1385
- Laid down: 25 February 2013
- Launched: 2 August 2013
- Sponsored by: Päivi Räsänen
- Completed: 9 May 2014
- Identification: IMO number: 9650377; Call sign: OJEM; MMSI number: 230018000
- Status: In service

General characteristics
- Type: Offshore patrol vessel
- Tonnage: 660 DWT (design draught); 1,800 DWT (maximum)
- Displacement: 4,000 tons
- Length: 95.9 m (314 ft 8 in)
- Beam: 17.4 m (57 ft 1 in)
- Draft: 5.0 m (16 ft 5 in)
- Ice class: E4 (equivalent to 1A Super)
- Installed power: 1 × Wärtsilä 12V34DF (6,400 kW); 2 × Wärtsilä 6L34DF (2 × 3,000 kW)
- Propulsion: Combined diesel-electric and diesel (CODLAD); one Rolls-Royce controllable-pitch propeller and two azimuth thrusters
- Speed: 18 knots (33 km/h; 21 mph)
- Boats & landing craft carried: Covered patrol boat; Rigid-hulled inflatable boat Workboat
- Complement: ~30
- Sensors & processing systems: Cassidian TRS-3D 3D radar
- Armament: 2 × Kongsberg Protector RWS
- Aviation facilities: Helipad

Turva is a Finnish offshore patrol vessel. Built in 2014 by STX Finland Rauma shipyard for the Finnish Border Guard, she is the largest vessel of the fleet as well as the first patrol vessel in Finland powered by liquefied natural gas (LNG).

== Development and construction ==
In the second supplemental budget of 2009, the Government of Finland reserved 57 million euro for the procurement of a new offshore patrol vessel for the Finnish Border Guard. In addition, a further 10.4 million euro was reserved for the design and development of the new vessel in 2009–2010. However, it was found out that the allocated funds would not be enough to purchase a vessel that would fulfill the requirements, so in the third supplemental budget of 2011 the funding was increased by 70 percent, bringing the price of the vessel to 97 million euro and making her the most expensive patrol vessel ever constructed in Finland.

The development of the new offshore patrol vessel was carried out in close co-operation with the Finnish Environment Institute and STX Finland Rauma shipyard which presented the UVL10 (Ulkovartiolaiva 2010, Finnish for "offshore patrol vessel 2010") concept to the public in October 2011. As part of the design process, model tests were carried out by VTT Technical Research Centre of Finland and Aker Arctic. On 21 December 2011, the Finnish Border Guard officially awarded the contract for the construction of the new offshore patrol vessel, which would provide over 400 man-years of work to the builder and had a domestic content of about 90 percent, to STX Finland Rauma shipyard with the initial delivery date set in November 2013. The shipyard had an option for a sister vessel, but no funding was secured for the second offshore patrol ship.

The steel cutting ceremony, which marks the official start of production, was held in Rauma on 22 October 2012 and the keel of vessel, identified by its yard number as "newbuilding 1385", was laid on 25 February 2013. A naming contest was also announced by the Finnish Border Guard. On 2 August 2013, the ship was launched and her sponsor, Minister of the Interior Päivi Räsänen, gave her the name Turva, Finnish for "protection" or "security". The name was chosen out of 1,358 proposals and has previously been used for a 1977-built patrol vessel that was sold to a private owner in 2007. The construction of the new offshore patrol vessel was slightly delayed and Turva began her first sea trials on 25 February 2014. About a month later, on 21 March, the vessel left for the second sea trials. Turva was completed and handed over to the Finnish Border Guard on 9 May 2014. However, her departure from Rauma was slightly delayed due to damage to one of her tanks during commissioning.

Turva replaced three smaller vessels: 1999-built Telkkä (sold to Norwegian interest), 2002-built Tavi (sold to UK Border Force and renamed HMC Protector) and 2004-built Tiira (sold together with Telkkä). The old vessels were not strengthened for navigation in ice and their oil spill prevention and response capability was not deemed adequate for dealing with the increased traffic in the Gulf of Finland.

On 16 September 2013, STX Finland decided to close the shipyard in June 2014 and for a while it looked like Turva would be the last new vessel built in Rauma where ships have been constructed for over 300 years. However, a new shipbuilding company, Rauma Marine Constructions, took over the shipyard in the summer of 2014.

In December 2020, the Finnish Government authorized the Border Guard to order two new offshore patrol vessels. The new vessels will be similar in size to Turva and enter service by 2025. On 16 August 2021, the Border Guard signed a letter of intent with Meyer Turku for the construction of the new vessels.

== Design ==
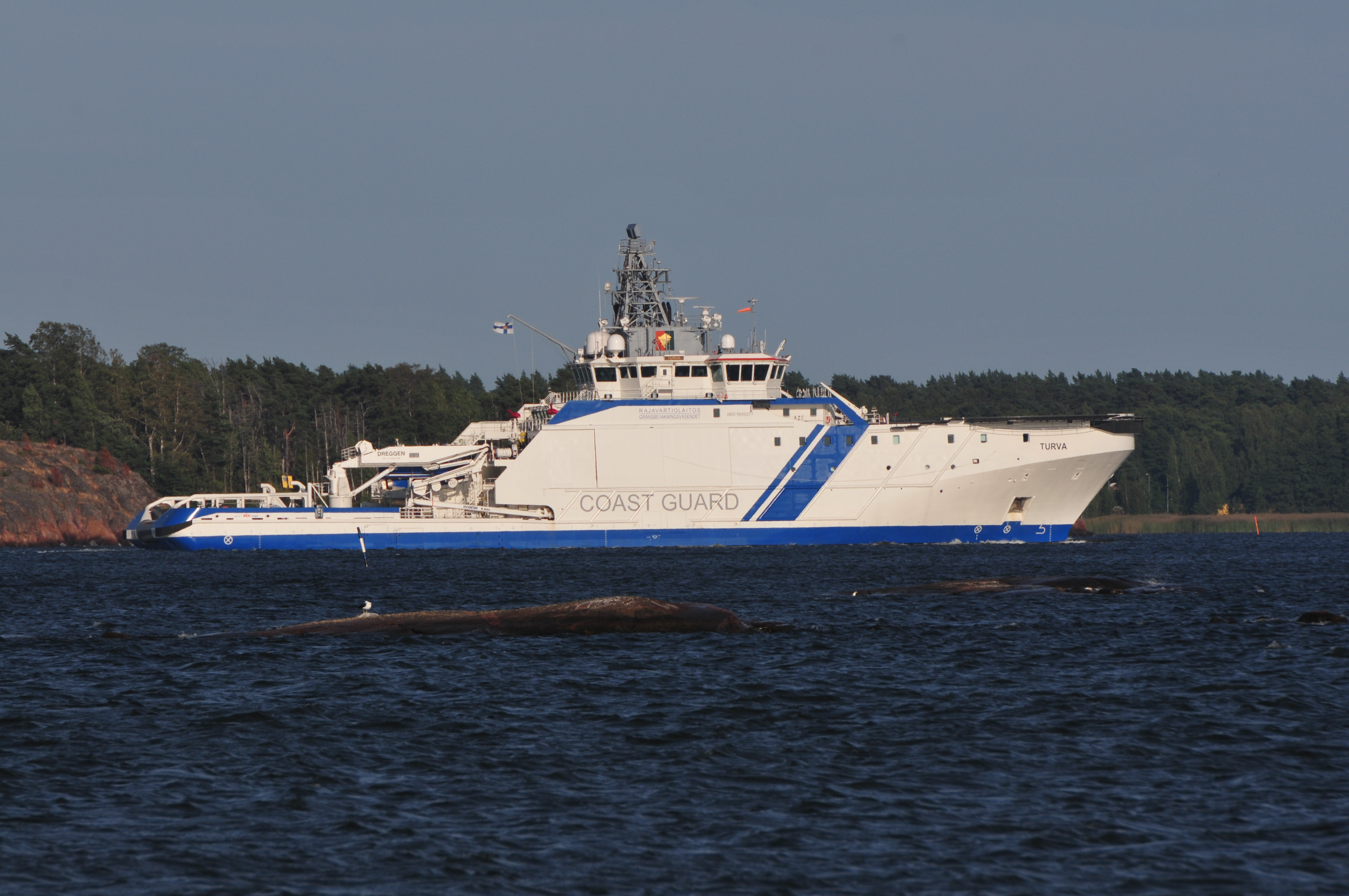
Starboard side view of Turva. Compared to the other photograph, the helipad can be seen folded open in this picture.

=== General characteristics ===
Turva is 95.9 metres (314 ft 8 in) long and 17.4 metres (57 ft 1 in) wide, making her the largest vessel ever commissioned by the Finnish Border Guard as well as longer than any existing or past vessel commissioned by the Finnish Navy. Fully laden, she draws 5 metres (16 ft) of water. At design draught, the vessel has a deadweight tonnage of 660 tonnes while her maximum deadweight is around 1,800 tonnes. Her complement will be approximately 30.

The main purposes of the new offshore patrol vessel are open sea patrol and ensuring border safety. Turva carries a rigid-hulled inflatable boat and a larger patrol boat, both stowed in covered recesses, that can be used to carry a vessel inspection teams to intercepted ships. While the vessel does not have a hangar, the forward helipad with folding "wings" is large enough for receiving and refueling a Eurocopter AS332 Super Puma, the largest type of helicopter operated by the Finnish Border Guard, during search-and-rescue operations at sea. Turva is the first Finnish patrol vessel fitted with such capability. For surveillance, Turva has a Cassidian TRS-3D radar—the same used in the Hamina-class missile boats and Hämeenmaa-class minelayers of the Finnish Navy—and extensive command and control systems which allow the ship to direct large rescue operations both in the air and on the surface. Although no details have been released, the vessel is also fitted with underwater surveillance systems.

Turva is also equipped for rescue operations, firefighting, emergency towing and demanding environmental duties. She can perform mechanical recovery of spilled oil with built-in recovery systems in open water, either by using conventional outriggers and booms in calm seas or a stiff steel boom and a special wave-dampening channel in heavy weather. The oil recovery system has been manufactured by the Finnish company Mobimar which has also provided equipment for other Finnish patrol vessels. Furthermore, the vessel is also fitted for but not with equipment capable of recovering oil in ice conditions. The internal storage tanks are dimensioned for 1,000 cubic metres (35,000 cu ft) of recovered oil and 200 cubic metres (7,100 cu ft) of recovered chemicals. The 350 square metres (3,800 sq ft) open aft deck is covered with tropical hardwood, Iroko. For diving support and oil recovery tasks, Turva carries a small workboat.

Like all Finnish offshore patrol vessels, Turva can be armed and used for national defense purposes in a crisis. However, during peacetime the vessels carry only small arms.

The blue-and-white colouring, inspired by the flag of Finland, is a departure from the traditional green hull utilized by Finnish Border Guard. Following the construction of Turva, it became the standard for all Finnish patrol vessels.

=== Power and propulsion ===
Turva is powered by three environmentally friendly Wärtsilä 34DF series dual-fuel engines capable of burning both diesel fuel as well as liquified natural gas (LNG). For redundancy and safe return to port, the engines are arranged in two independent engine rooms divided by a watertight bulkhead. In the aft engine room, a 12-cylinder Wärtsilä 12V34DF producing 6,400 kW (8,600 hp) is mechanically coupled to a controllable-pitch propeller. In the forward engine room, two 6-cylinder 6L34DF generating sets with an output of 3,000 kW (4,000 hp) each produce power for two electrically driven Rolls-Royce Azipull AZP120CP Z-drive azimuth thrusters. If the forward engine room is damaged, the shaft generator coupled to the bigger engine can be used to produce electricity for the azimuth thrusters, which are required for steering the vessel as she has no separate rudders, and other onboard systems. Since the azimuth thrusters are powered by electric motors and the centerline shaft is mechanically coupled to the main engine, the propulsion system as a whole could be referred to as "combined diesel-electric and diesel" (CODLAD). Turva is the first ship fitted with this type of propulsion arrangement—two azimuth thrusters and a centerline shaft—which was originally developed for icebreakers and icegoing LNG carriers. For maneuvering and DP2 class dynamic positioning, the ship has a transverse bow thruster and a retractable azimuth thruster in the bow.

Turva is the first LNG-powered offshore patrol vessel as well as only the second LNG-powered ship (after Viking Grace) to enter service in Finland. Unlike in the ferry, which has two deck-mounted LNG storage tanks, the single fuel tank in Turva is built inside the vessel.

The service speed of the vessel will be 18 knots (33 km/h; 21 mph) and despite her bulbous bow she will also be capable of breaking level ice up to 80 centimetres (31 in) in thickness. With a bollard pull of approximately 100 tonnes, Turva is capable of towing even the largest tankers regularly sailing in the Baltic Sea.

=== Armament ===
Turva is equipped with two Kongsberg Protector RWS atop the corners of the bridge, which can be equipped with a variety of weapons.

== Service history ==
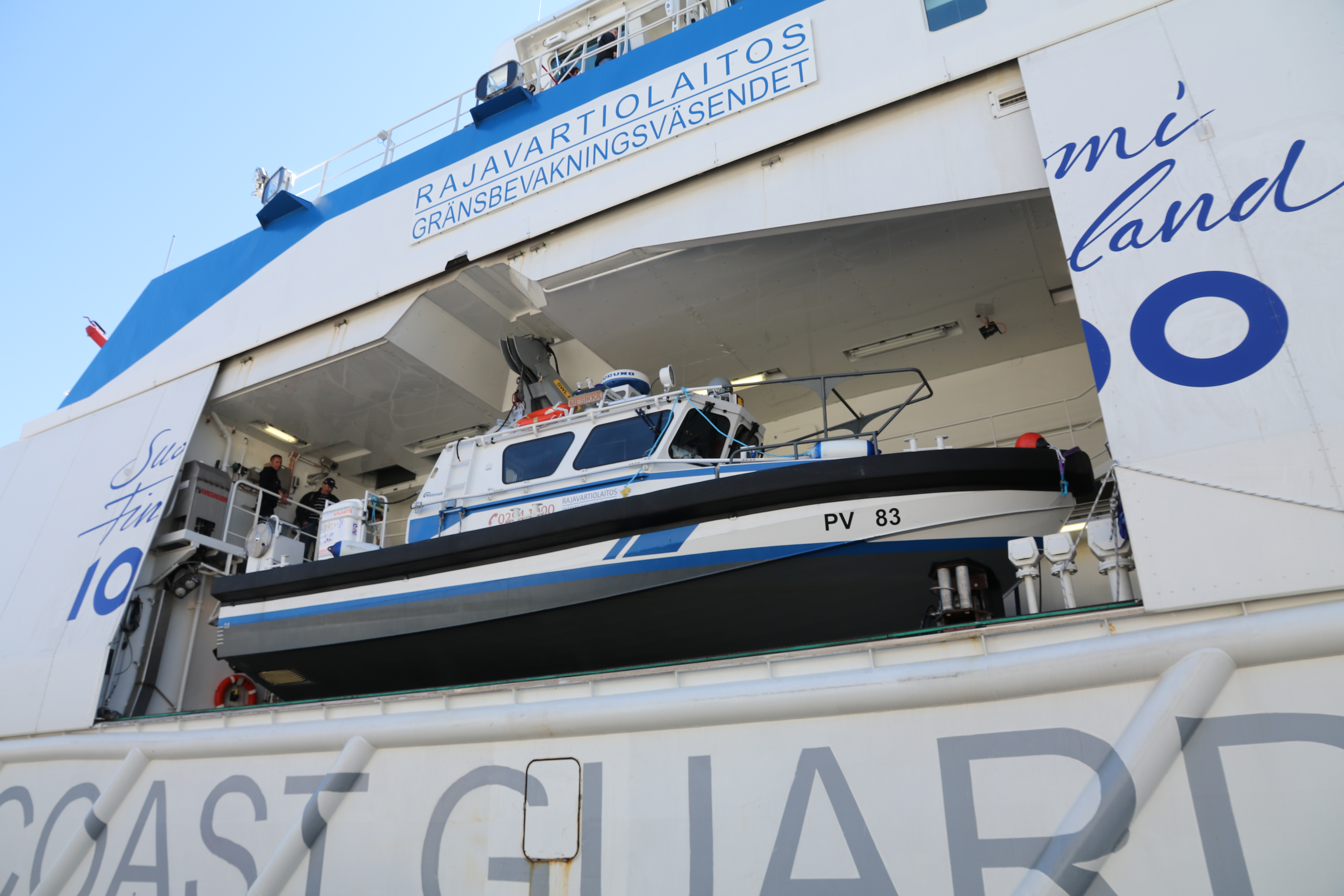
Turva's Watercat 1000 Patrol daughter craft that sank on 20 June 2020.

On 20 June 2020, Turva's Watercat 1000 Patrol daughter craft sank after running aground off Loviisa on the Midsummer Day evening. Two members of the three-strong crew managed to escape the rapidly sinking boat while the third person was trapped in the cabin and later died in the hospital. According to initial reports, the boat took a shortcut on the wrong side of a fairway mark and hit an underwater rock at high speed.

On 25 December 2024, Turva intercepted the oil tanker Eagle S in the Gulf of Finland. Eagle S was eventually seized as it was suspected of sabotaging the Estlink 2 submarine cable.

On 31 December 2025, Turva intercepted the freighter Fitburg in the Gulf of Finland. Fitburg was suspected of sabotage in the 2025 Elisa data cable incident.
