= Mikko Porvali =

Finnish author, historian, lawyer and police inspector (born 1980)

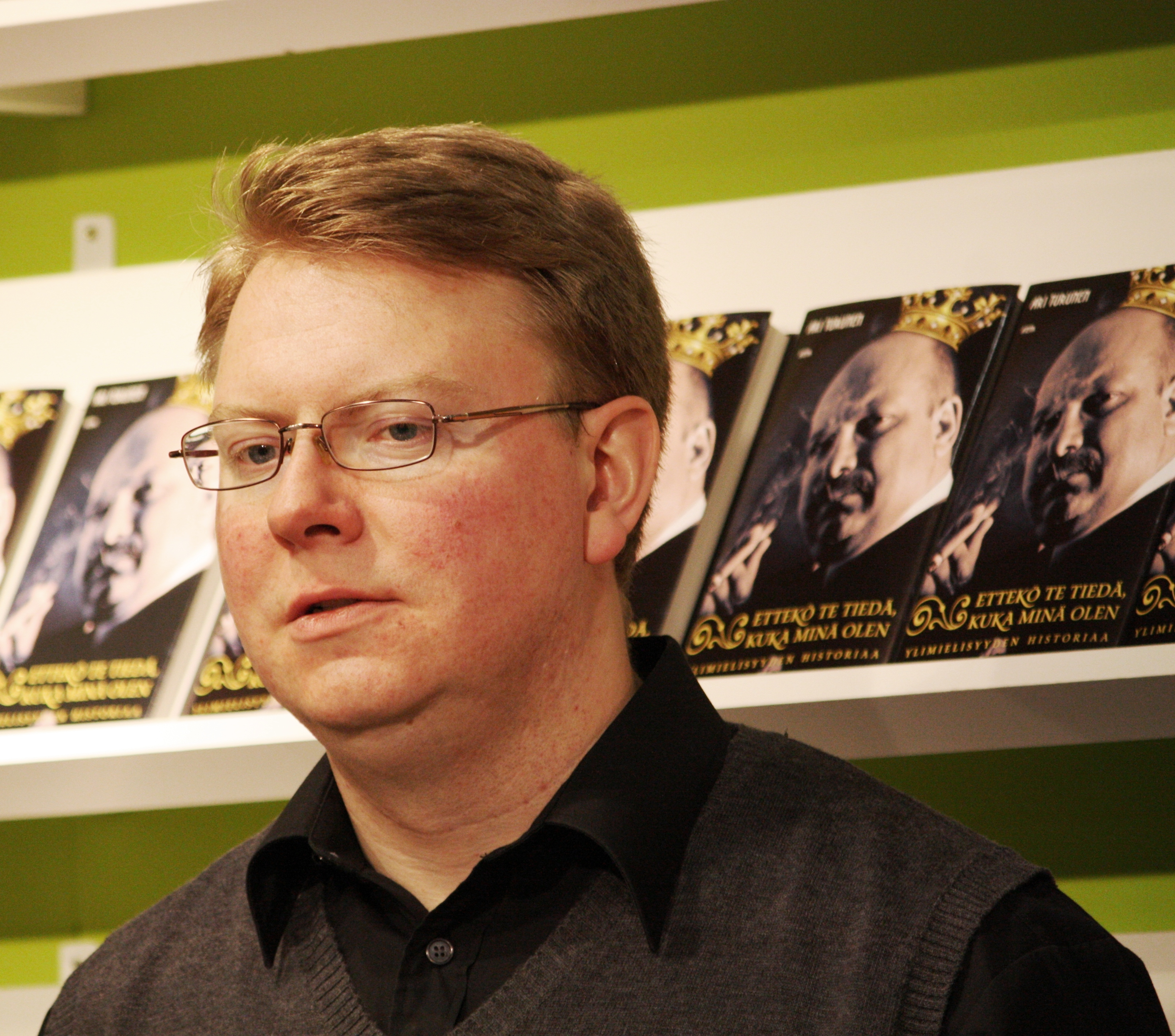
Mikko Porvali in 2010.

Mikko Pietari Porvali (born 15 April 1980) is a Finnish author, historian, lawyer and a Detective Chief Inspector of the Finnish Police.

Porvali has published several books on historical themes, mostly dealing with topics such as military history and intelligence, as well as the history of the Finnish Police. His books have been published in Finland by Atena Publishing and in Sweden by Lind & Co.

== Life ==
Born in Petäjävesi, Porvali is a son of a policeman and a grandson of a family of Karelian evacuees. His family roots are in Kuokkala, Terijoki (presently Repino, Zelenogorsk, St. Petersburg), and many of his books are based on this setting and the lives of his elder relatives. This includes especially his grandfather, a Finnish soldier and a border guard on the Russian border of the Karelian Isthmus.

Porvali has served in the Finnish Police since 2001, proceeding from a rural area constable to higher ranks of the detective branch. He has graduated from the Finnish Police College and the Faculty of Law of the University of Lapland. Porvali served the Finnish Defence Forces both domestically and on crisis management missions abroad reaching the rank of Major.

== Books ==
=== An author of fact and fiction ===
Porvali has published five non-fiction books about the Finnish military intelligence during World War II. His books describe the development of the Finnish military long range patrolling as well as the Finnish efforts on espionage during the war. His book Operaatio Hokki was nominated for the Finlandia Prize for non-fiction in 2011.

Two of Porvali's books depict colorful personal stories of the wartime era. The first, Kaatunut Normandiassa (Killed in action, Normandy) narrates the story of his relative killed as a member of the Canadian troops during the Normandy Campaign, and the second, Rautasormus (An Iron Ring) is a collection of exceptional wartime love stories.

In addition to non-fiction books, Porvali has written two crime fiction novels based on true stories stemming from the history of the Finnish police force. The first of these books, Sinisen kuoleman kuva (Face of the Blue Death), was published in 2015. The second, Veri ei vaikene (Blood never remains silent), published in 2016, was awarded as the year's best crime fiction book in Finland.

=== Bibliography ===
==== Non-fiction ====
- Vakoojakoulu: Päämajan asiamieskoulutus jatkosodassa, Jyväskylä: Atena, 2010. ISBN 978-951-796-655-9
- Kaatunut Normandiassa: Suomalaissotilaan tarina, Jyväskylä: Atena, 2011. ISBN 978-951-796-701-3
- Operaatio Hokki: Päämajan vaiettu kaukopartio, Jyväskylä: Atena, 2011. ISBN 978-951-796-760-0
- Salainen tiedustelija: Suomalaisen vakoojaupseerin kirjeet 1940–44, Jyväskylä: Atena, 2012. ISBN 978-951-796-849-2
- Rautasormus ja muita sota-ajan rakkaustarinoita, Jyväskylä: Atena, 2013. ISBN 978-951-796-890-4
- Hyökkäyksen edellä: Kaukopartio Kannaksella kesällä 1941, Jyväskylä: Atena, 2013. ISBN 978-951-796-945-1
- Vanki, vakooja, sissi, Jyväskylä: Atena, 2015. ISBN 978-952-300-121-3
- Tiedustelun näkymätön historia - Antiikista maailmansotiin, Atena, 2018. ISBN 978-952-300-401-6
- Kohti itää - Päämajan kaukopartio-osasto Vehniäinen 1941, Atena, 2021. ISBN 978-952-300-842-7
- Syvärin takana - Päämajan kaukopartio-osasto Vehniäinen 1941-43, Atena, 2022. ISBN 978-951-142-333-1

==== Novels ====
- Sinisen kuoleman kuva. Karelia Noir I, Jyväskylä: Atena, 2015. ISBN 978-952-300-158-9
- Veri ei vaikene. Karelia Noir II, Jyväskylä: Atena, 2016. ISBN 978-952-300-244-9
- Kadonneen kaupungin varjo. Karelia Noir III, Jyväskylä: Atena, 2018. ISBN 978-952-300-448-1

==== Translated into Swedish ====
- Bakom Röda arméns linjer: Finska fjärrpatrullens sista uppdrag Stockholm: Lind & Co, 2012. ISBN 978-91-86597-34-4
- Bakom fiendens linjer: Den första finska fjärrpatrullen på Karelska näset Stockholm: Lind & Co, 2015. ISBN 978-91-86597-83-2
- Fånge, spion, partisan Stockholm: Lind & Co, 2016. ISBN 978-91-88243-03-4
- Spionskolan: Finlands hemliga agentverksamhet under andra världskriget Stockholm: Lind & Co, 2017. ISBN 978-91-88243-25-6
- En blå död, Karelia noir I Stockholm: Lind & Co, 2017. ISBN 978-91-74618-08-2
- Blod döljer inget. Lind & Co, 2018. ISBN 978-91-7779-650-3
