= Russian shadow fleet =

Russian vessels evading sanctions

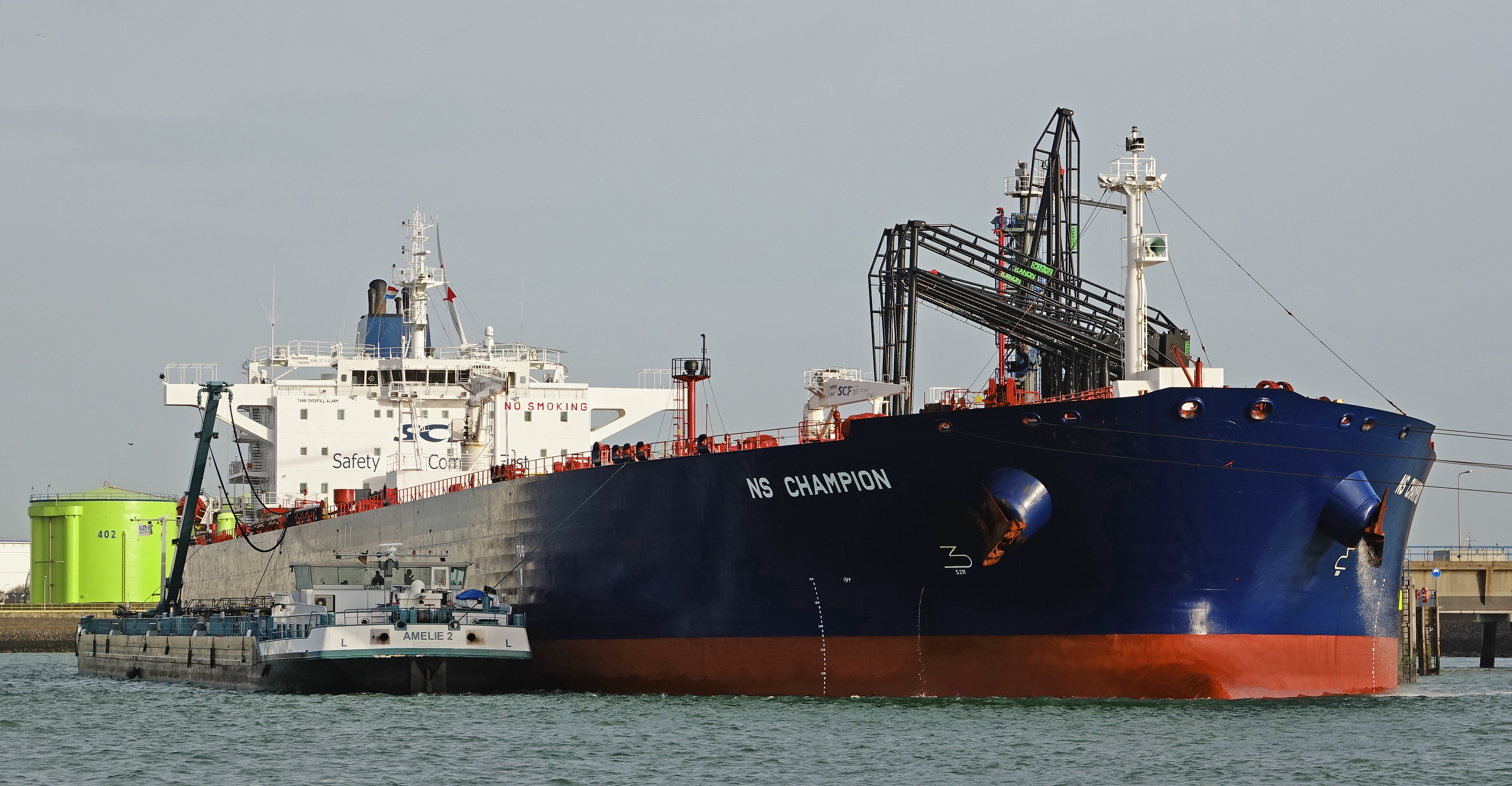
The tanker NS Champion, considered by the US Office of Foreign Assets Control to be one of the vessels in the Russian shadow fleet

The Russian shadow fleet is a clandestine network of hundreds of vessels operated by Russia to evade sanctions, following the enactment of 2022 Russian crude oil price cap sanctions by the G7 countries and European Union (EU), in response to the 2022 Russian invasion of Ukraine.

To circumvent these restrictions, vessels use complex ownership and corporate management structures, flags of convenience, and frequently change their names. Various tactics are also used to obscure the origin of their cargo, including ship-to-ship transshipment, disabling transponders, transmitting false data, and other deceptive or even illegal methods.

== Background ==
According to a November 2024 briefing by the European Parliamentary Research Service, the terms shadow fleet, dark fleet, and grey fleet do not have a consistent definition and are used interchangeably by journalists and politicians, making it difficult to assess the scale of the phenomenon. In December 2023, the International Maritime Organization (IMO) agreed on a precise definition, stating that dark fleet or shadow fleet are "ships that are engaged in illegal operations for the purposes of circumventing sanctions, evading compliance with safety or environmental regulations, avoiding insurance costs, or engaging in other illegal activities".

Shadow fleets have been used by Iran and Venezuela to avoid international economic sanctions. Russia was aware that sanctions against their country would result in a need to control oil tankers to export crude and processed oil. Tankers approaching their end of life were purchased by Russia for Russian oil companies or opportunists to rent out for a large fee to maintain the flow of oil exports. The price of such old tankers rose, with vendors making large profits from their sales. By the end of 2022 there were over 600 ships in the Russian shadow fleet, 400 of which were crude oil tankers; the fleet consisted of 1,100–1,400 ships by December 2023. Of these ships, 118 have been sanctioned by the United States, the European Union (EU), or the UK. In 2025, the shadow fleet was reported as having more than tripled in size since 2022.

A major issue with the Russian shadow fleet is marine insurance: Western countries have minimum criteria for insurance, which includes verification of the condition of the ship. Two thirds of ships carrying Russian oil have insurers classed as "unknown"—with the vessels therefore lacking proper insurance. Being old, they are more prone to breakdown or leakage. in January 2024 the 18-year-old sanctioned Peria became stranded because of an anchor malfunction, which caused the closure of the Bosphorus to shipping. Shadow ship operators disguise the true owners and do not feel obliged to maintain the ships to a high standard. Turning off automatic identification systems and undertaking open sea ship-to-ship transfers of oil increase the risk of collisions and spillages.

Certain flags of convenience are favored. Gabon more than doubled its ships registry in 2023, with an estimated 98% of its tankers considered to be high risk and with no identifiable owner. The number of incidents affecting these tankers has increased to around two a month, with groundings, collisions, fire and engine failures, recovering the cost of rescuing these ships is doubtful due to the unknown owner and the unknown insurance, if any.

The Ukrainian government oversees a catalog of ships operating as part of the shadow fleet, listing 1337 ships as of February 2026. Various tactics are adopted to make it harder to track such vessels. These include the renaming of ships, changing their country of registration, sailing under false flags, switching off tracking signals, and broadcasting false locations. In one instance, the Arcusat, previously named the Tia, changed its IMO identification number.

== Sanctioning ==
From the autumn of 2023, companies involved in breaching the Russia Oil Price Cap Regime were investigated and sanctioned further by the U.S government. On 10 January 2025, the U.S. Dept of the Treasury added about 180 vessels, as well as traders, major oil companies, and senior Russian oil executives to the sanctioned list. In June 2025, the Australian Government placed sanctions on 60 vessels it deemed part of Russia's shadow fleet.

In July 2025, the United Kingdom sanctioned 135 oil tankers, along with the Russian companies Intershipping Services LLC and Litasco Middle East DMCC.

Finnish Customs declared the tanker Eagle S to be one of the shadow fleet, after an investigation was launched into the sabotage by Russia of the power cables linking Estonia and Finland. The vessel was seized by the Finns, and the Estonian Navy launched an operation to protect undersea cables in the Baltic Sea.

=== Insurance of tankers ===
Sanctions imposed by the G7, the EU, and allied jurisdictions prohibit P&I insurers and other maritime service providers under their jurisdiction from covering shipments of Russian-origin crude oil and petroleum products sold above the agreed price cap. As a result, a large portion of Russia's shadow fleet operates outside the international insurance system. Many of these tankers rely on Russian or offshore insurers, such as Ingosstrakh. Investigations have repeatedly documented cases of vessels presenting falsified or expired insurance certificates, creating a gap in reliable coverage. The absence of dependable P&I insurance heightens risks for coastal states and the environment, as unreliable insurers may refuse to cover damages in the event of an accident. Despite efforts by international regulators and port authorities to tighten verification of insurance documentation, ships in the Russian shadow fleet can manipulate the system. The post-sanctions expansion of the fleet has increased the number of vessels lacking adequate international insurance, causing a considerable safety and environmental risk.

Any suspected breaches of sanctions by insurance companies are investigated. Sometimes when an application for insurance is made, the company receives false information about the cargo's source, price and destination, and sometimes the ship's name and IMO number.

Ro Marine, an insurance company based in Oslo, cancelled insurance on three tankers in December 2023 which were identified as non-compliant with oil price cap regulations. Fake insurance documents from Ro Marine have been used to deceive NATO countries and support Russia's shadow fleet. Following exposés by Danwatch and the Norwegian broadcaster NRK, flag states have detained ships and revoked Ro Marine's approval. NATO has since tightened controls and investigated the company.

=== Oil traders ===
On 20 December 2023 the US Department of the Treasury announced sanctions against three companies that traded Russian oil at a price that did not comply with price cap rules, Voliton DMCC from the UAE, and the Hong Kong companies Bellatrix Energy Limited and Covart Energy Limited. Covart owns the oil products tanker Sanar 15 (IMO 9777670), which is also sanctioned.

=== Partial easing of sanctions ===
On 12 March 2026, amid the war with Iran, U.S. Secretary of the Treasury Scott Bessent announced the temporary lifting of restrictions on the sale of Russian oil held on detained shadow fleet tankers. The decision was intended to achieve "stability in global energy markets" and remained in effect until 11 April 2026.

== Legislation ==
Despite causing tangible harm, targeted countries face significant legal hurdles in blocking the fleet. In accordance with the United Nations Convention on the Law of the Sea (UNCLOS), ships are granted the right of innocent passage through territorial waters, including the 12 nautical miles (22 km; 14 mi) adjacent to a country's coastline. The convention also contains articles that provide for restrictions on navigation that poses a serious threat to the environment. Vessels must also obey the laws of the country it is traversing, including having proper insurance and being in good repair.

The shadow fleet uses the Danish Straits for passage. Despite the country facing an environmental threat from the barely insured vessels in poor condition that often pass the straits without local navigational assistance and proper paperwork, merchant vessels are guaranteed the right of peaceful passage through the Danish Straits under the Copenhagen Convention of 1857.

== Reactions ==
The EU published a brief titled "Russia's 'shadow fleet': Bringing the threat to light", in October 2024, outlining Russia's tactics to evade sanctions. On 14 November, the EU voted to adopt a resolution ensuring full enforcement of sanctions against Russia.

Two ships caused an oil spill with severe environmental damage in the Black Sea in December 2024 due to negligence by their Russian operators. According to Mykhailo Podolyak, an advisor to the head of the Office of the President of Ukraine, these tankers are part of Russia's shadow fleet. Following the major environmental crisis caused by the ships, the worst this century in the Black Sea region, Ukraine called for the international community to take action to deter the fleet. Latvia also called for the ships to be banned from EU territorial waters.

On 16 December 2024, twelve countries consisting of Britain, Germany, Poland, the Netherlands, the Nordic countries (Denmark, Finland, Iceland, Norway, and Sweden) and the three Baltic states (Estonia, Latvia and Lithuania) agreed to cooperate to "disrupt and deter" Russia's shadow fleet to prevent sanctions breaches. The UK announced additional sanctions against the shadow fleet the following day.

== Maritime incidents ==
=== Attacks on vessels ===
In late November 2025, Ukraine's Security Service (SBU) conducted drone strikes on the shadow fleet tankers Virat and Kairos off the Turkish Black Sea coast, and later claimed responsibility. This was followed by an attack on the EU-sanctioned tanker Dashan in the Black Sea. A Turkish company halted Russian-related operations after its vessel Mersin was damaged. In December 2025, the SBU executed its first long-range strike in the Mediterranean Sea, targeting a tanker that had recently delivered oil to India.

According to a report by The Atlantic citing U.S. and Ukrainian officials in December 2025, the Trump administration did not object to the Ukrainian strikes on the shadow fleet and approved assistance for them, considering them an "important tool" to put pressure on the Russian government to negotiate peace.

=== Enforcement actions ===
On 26 December 2024, the Finnish Police Rapid Response Unit Karhu, assisted by Gulf of Finland Coast Guard District, two helicopters from the Finnish Navy and the Finnish Coast Guard, and the patrol vessel Turva, boarded the Cook Islands-registered tanker Eagle S, suspected of dragging its anchor and tearing off two submarine communication cables belonging to the Finnish company Elisa the day before.

On 21 March 2025, German authorities detained the tanker Eventin. The ship, under the flag of Panama, had left the Russian port of Ust-Luga and was heading for Egypt. The ship, which had been placed on a list of sanctioned ships by the EU in February, had lost engine power and drifted into German waters. After determining that the Eventin carried some 100,000 tons of sanctioned crude oil from Russia, German customs seized the ship and, in an unprecedented step, confiscated the cargo, theoretically transferring ownership to the German state. That decision was contested in a Munich court, which ruled in December 2025 that ships in distress that entered German waters, were not to be seized. The court suspended the measure, but did not decide the fate of the oil.

On 11 April 2025, the Estonian Navy minehunter EML Admiral Cowan seized the flagless tanker Kiwala in the Baltic Sea. The ship, which claimed it was registered in Djibouti, had been sanctioned by the EU and the UK, and was on its way to load oil in Ust-Luga. It was released on 28 April.

On 10 May, after unidentified drones were spotted over a military site in Kiel, German authorities asked the Netherlands Coastguard to look out for the Antigua and Barbuda-flagged freighter Dolphin, manned by an all-Russian crew. The vessel was searched by the Dutch, who found no evidence that drones were operated from it.

On 13 May, the Estonian Navy's patrol vessel EML Raju escorted the Gabonese-flagged tanker Jaguar out of Estonia's territorial waters. The Raju was supported by AgustaWestland AW139 helicopters, M-28 Skytruck aircraft, and a Polish MiG 29. A Russian Sukhoi Su-35 fighter violated Estonia´s airspace the same day. Portuguese F-16s from NATO's Baltic Air Policing Mission responded to the incident with a reconnaissance flight.

On 17 May, while shadowing the Russian-crewed freighter Luga in the German Exclusive Economic Zone, unidentified drones overflew the German Federal Coast Guard patrol boat Potsdam for three hours before entering Dutch waters. The Luga was eventually searched by Belgian authorities; no traces of drone activity were found.

On 21 May, a shadow fleet tanker, the Sun, waving the Antigua and Barbuda flag, was spotted sailing around an undersea 600-megawatt power line linking Sweden and Poland. The vessel was scared off by a Polish aerial patrol, and later the area was swept by the Polish research ship ORP Heweliusz.

On 16 June, for the first time, the Russian Navy began to escort shadow fleet tankers in convoys, when it accompanied the Selva and the Sierra, both of which were under UK and EU sanctions. The ships, guarded by the Project 20380 Steregushchiy–class missile corvette Boykiy, were tracked heading to load oil at Russian ports. The convoy passed through the English Channel on 22 June.

On 7 September, German Special Police forces seized and searched the Russian-crewed coaster Scanlark in the Kiel Canal. The vessel was suspected of operating a spy drone that overflew a German Navy warship on 26 August. The ship was owned by the Estonian company Vista Shipping Agency and registered under the flag of Saint Vincent and the Grenadines.

On 30 September, French naval forces seized the sanctioned Russian shadow fleet tanker Boracay, hoisting the flag of Benin by Saint-Nazaire. The ship was suspected of being one of three tankers which launched drones over Denmark between 22 and 28 September, disrupting Copenhagen Airport operations. Russian President Vladimir Putin called the incident "an act of piracy". French authorities later determined that the tanker was the Kiwala, seized by the Estonian Navy in April. Two Chinese sailors—the captain and his first mate—were arrested. The tanker was released five days later along with the crewmembers.

On 20 November, the American destroyer USS Stockdale intercepted the Comorian-flagged tanker Seahorse, a sanctioned Russian shadow fleet ship sailing in the Caribbean Sea towards Venezuela. The Russian vessel was forced to shift course to Cuba.

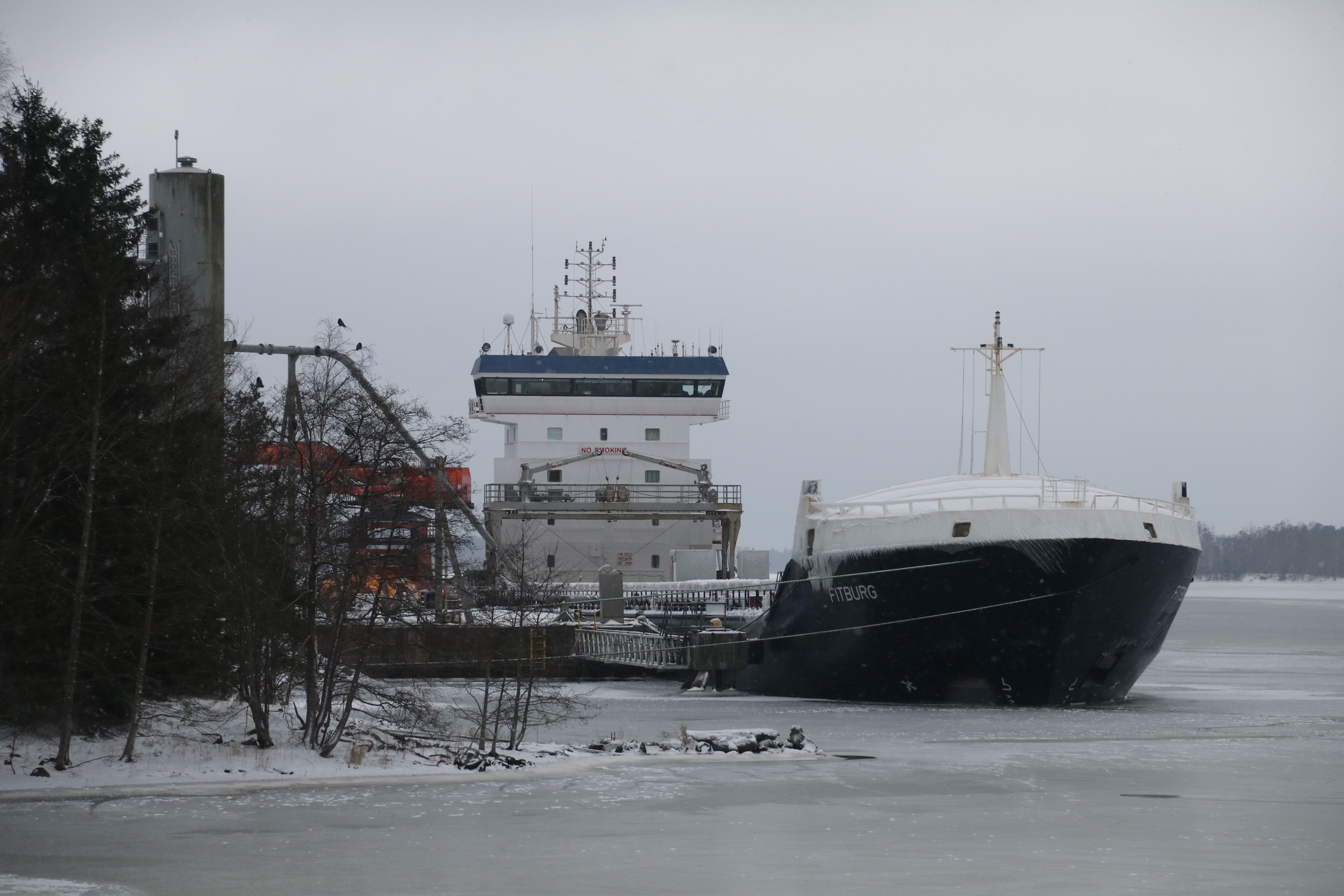
Shadow fleet tanker Fitburg, seized by the Finnish Coast Guard in January 2026

On 31 December, a Finnish coastguard vessel, supported by helicopters and special troops, captured the freighter Fitburg, which was registered with St. Vincent and the Grenadines, and was en route to Haifa from St. Petersburg. Fitburg was carrying structural steel, whose importation is sanctioned by the EU, and was suspected of damaging two undersea cables linking Estonia and Finland. Two crewmembers were arrested by the Finnish police.

On 7 January 2026, the US Navy and the US Coast Guard seized the Russian-flagged tanker Marinera in the North Atlantic, after it had been shadowed by the patrol vessel USCGC Munro for several weeks. The tanker has previously bore the name Bella I and hoisted the flag of Guyana.

On 22 January, the French Navy seized the UK-sanctioned and Comorian-flagged tanker Grinch in the Alboran Sea, during an operation led by a Horizon-class frigate and monitored by the British patrol boat HMS Dagger. Naval commandos transported by two NH90 helicopters boarded the ship, despite previous Russian warnings against boarding. The tanker had departed from Murmansk on 5 January. French president Emmanuel Macron said that "We will not tolerate any violation,"(...) "The activities of the 'shadow fleet' contribute to financing the war of aggression against Ukraine". Ukrainian president Volodomyr Zelensky thanked Emmanuel Macron, and declared that "This is exactly the kind of resolve needed to ensure that Russian oil no longer finances Russia's war". The tanker was eventually released on 17 February after "paying several million euros and three weeks of costly immobilisation", in the words of French Foreign Minister Jean-Noël Barrot.

On 14 February, the Veronica III, a Panama-flagged tanker known to transport Russian oil, was boarded by the US Navy in the Indian Ocean.

On 28 February, the Guinea-registered tanker Ethera was seized in a part of the North Sea inside Belgium's exclusive economic zone by Belgian special forces assisted by French helicopters. The ship was returning to Russia and suspected by authorities of being a part of the Russian shadow fleet. The Russian captain was questioned, and a criminal investigation was launched. The tanker was escorted to Zeebrugge. The Belgian Federal Public Service Mobility and Transport later determined that the ship had been sailing under a false flag and had not been registered since August 2025, and the owner of the vessel lost his case before a Belgian court on 14 April 2026.

On 8 March, Sweden detained a crew member of the Russian "shadow fleet" cargo ship Caffa 17, which was seized on 7 March due to suspicion of transporting stolen Ukrainian grain. The Swedish Coast Guard said the ship is on Ukraine's sanctions list, and was sailing under a false Guinean flag. The crew member detained is suspected of violations of the maritime code, the ship safety act and the use of a forged document. In August 2026, Swedish Court documents obtained by Agence France-Presse indicated that the ship would be handed over to Ukraine, with the Supreme Court rejecting Caffa Shipping Ltd's appeal to block the transfer.

On 12 March, the Swedish Coast Guard said it had seized the false-flagged tanker Sea Owl II, belonging to the Russian shadow fleet and sailing under a Comorian flag. It added that the ship is on an EU sanctions list and has recently been transporting oil between Russia and Brazil. The Russian captain of the ship was arrested by the Swedish Prosecution Authority for the forgery of documents.

On 20 March, France seized the oil tanker Deyna in the Mediterranean, which had sailed from Russia and was suspected of being part of the Russian shadow fleet and flying a false Mozambican flag. The operation was carried out with support from the United Kingdom, whose armed forces, including HMS Cutlass based at Gibraltar, assisted in monitoring and tracking the vessel. On 16 April, France freed the tanker after its owner paid a fine and conceded that he had been unable to provide proof of the ship's nationality.

On 8 April, the Russian frigate Admiral Grigorovich convoyed two shadow fleet tankers, the Cameroon-registered Enigma and the Russian flagged Universal, through the English Channel, shadowed by the fleet replenishment ship RFA Tideforce. Universal had been outlawed in British waters in September 2025, while Enigma had been sanctioned by the United Kingdom. The following day, Russian spokesman Dmitry Peskov declared that "The Russian Federation considers itself entitled to, and will certainly take, measures to protect its interests", dubbing the recent boarding of Russian shadow fleet tankers "acts of piracy". The British government later admitted that 184 sanctioned vessels from the Russian shadow fleet transited through British waters from March to May.

The Swedish Coast Guard said it boarded and detained the Jin Hui sailing under a Syrian flag on 3 May 2026, with the captain of the ship, a Chinese citizen, being arrested suspected of offenses including using a false document. Swedish Civil Defense Minister Carl-Oskar Bohlin said the ship was under sanctions and suspected of being part of the Russian shadow fleet.

On 1 June French navy troops boarded the tanker Tagor in the Atlantic Ocean, 740 kilometres (460 mi) west of Brittany, after the ship had left the port of Murmansk earlier. After confirming that it was sailing under a wrong flag, it was seized and diverted.

On 14 June, Royal Marine Commandos seized the Cameroon-flagged tanker Smyrtos, supported by the Royal Navy frigate HMS Sutherland, the minesweeper HMS Ledbury, the Maritime Air Group and an RAF P-8 Poseidon patrol aircraft. The tanker had departed Ust-Luga on 5 June bounded for Port Said.

On 30 August, the Italian offshore patrol ship Paolo Thaon di Revel intercepted and boarded the tanker MV Sun west of Pantelleria for flag verification as part of the European Union's Operation Irini. The oiler had departed from Cotonou, in Benin, and was bound to Istambul.

=== Russian military involvement and espionage ===
In August 2025, the Danish investigative media company Danwatch reported that it had obtained internal correspondence from the Danish state-owned pilotage company DanPilot speaking about reports of uniformed "extra crew members"—presumably Russian—photographing infrastructure such as bridges. Danish military sources suggested this was done so as to inform the Russian Federal Security Service (FSB). In December 2025, Sweden's Sveriges Television reported that the Swedish Amphibious Corps (Amf) had reported armed and uniformed personnel behaving in a similar way. The Amf believed they had been hired by private security companies. SVT quoted Swedish military officials who said that there was an increased Russian military presence in shadow fleet shipping lanes, supposedly to support the shadow fleet.

In February 2026, Agence France-Presse reported that two Russian security crew were aboard the Boracay when French authorities boarded the ship; one was a former member of the Wagner group. They were tasked with protection instructions, ensuring the ship followed orders in line with Russian interests, and gathering intelligence. Their presence was confirmed the captain's lawyer. The crew were reported to be part of a private security group called Moran Security Group, founded by retired FSB colonel Vyacheslav Kalashnikov.

In April, Russian warships began escorting "shadow fleet" vessels in British waters.

On 16 June 2026, in an apparent retaliation for the capture of the tanker Skyros, the Russian frigate Admiral Grigorovich fired warning shots at a British yacht in the English Channel off the Isle of Wight. The yacht, who suffered no injuries or damage, was assisted by the British patrol vessel HMS Tyne.

In July 2026, intelligence experts said that Russia had used the shadow fleet to launch drones to spy on nuclear weapons in Britain and bases across Europe. Analysts pinpointed the timing of drone sightings in 13 European countries, and on each occasion at least one Russian shadow fleet tanker was nearby.

== See also ==
- International sanctions during the Russo-Ukrainian war
- Russian sabotage operations in Europe
