= Eagle S =

Crude oil tanker detained in Finland

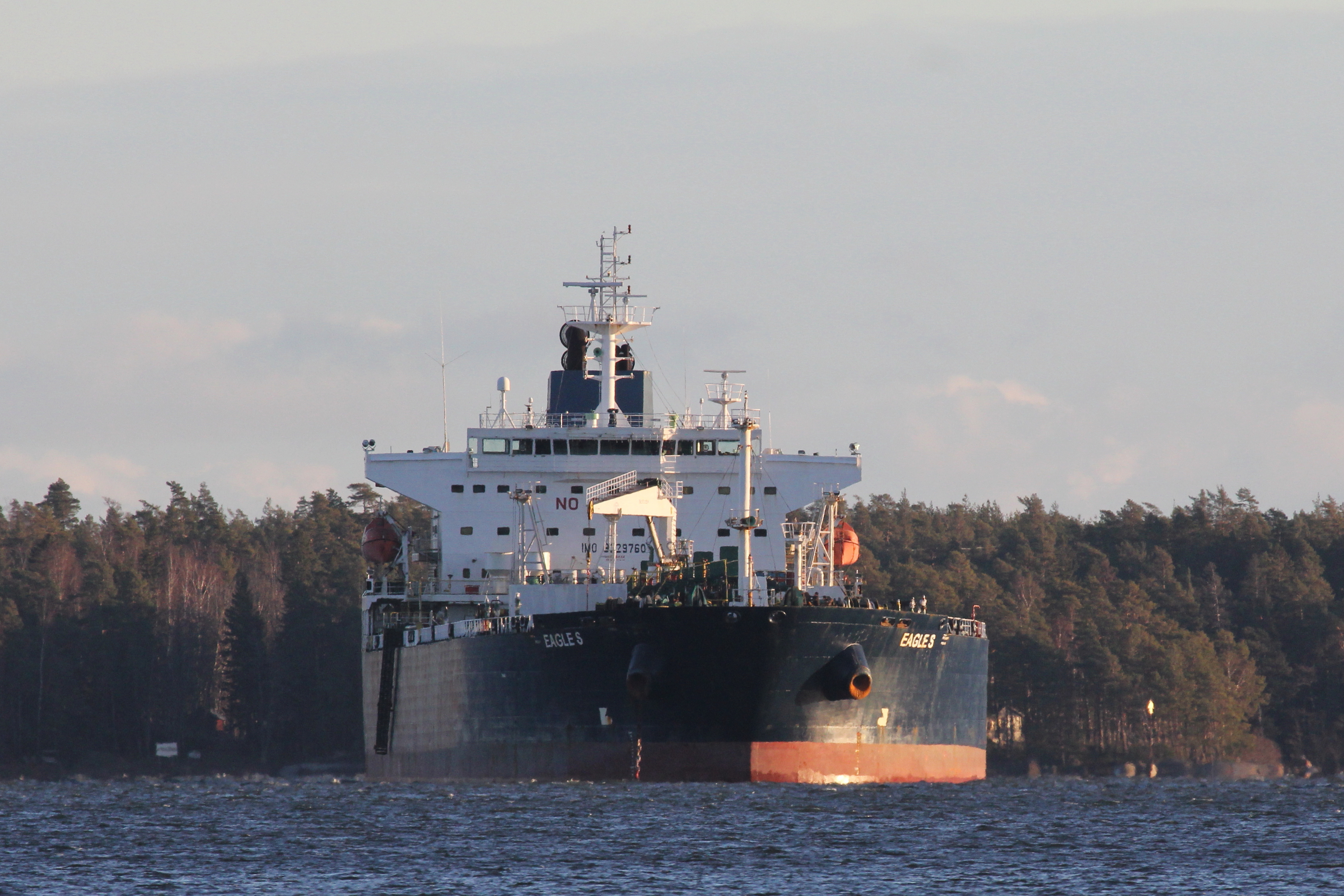
- Eagle S off Porvoo, Finland, on 31 December 2024

History
- Name: FR8 Pride (2006–2012); LR Mimosa (2012–2015); Norstar Intrepid (2015–2023); Eagle S (2023–present)
- Port of registry: Singapore (2006–2007); Majuro, Marshall Islands (2007–2023); Avatiu, Cook Islands (2023–present)
- Ordered: August 2004
- Builder: New Century Shipyard (Jingjiang, China)
- Yard number: 0307310
- Laid down: 20 December 2004
- Launched: 28 August 2005
- Completed: 16 March 2006
- Identification: IMO number: 9329760; MMSI number: 518998865; Call sign: E5U4845 (2023–present)
- Fate: Scrapped in 2025

General characteristics
- Type: Crude oil and oil products tanker
- Tonnage: 42,010 GT; 22,444 NT; 74,035 DWT
- Displacement: 89,381 t (87,969 long tons)
- Length: 228.6 m (750 ft 0 in)
- Beam: 32.3 m (106 ft 0 in)
- Draught: 14.5 m (47 ft 7 in)
- Installed power: MAN-B&W 5S60MC-C (11,300 kW)
- Propulsion: Single shaft with fixed pitch propeller
- Speed: 14.5 knots (26.9 km/h; 16.7 mph) (maximum); 12 knots (22 km/h; 14 mph) (service)
- Capacity: 12 cargo tanks; 81,320 m^{3} (511,500 bbl)
- Crew: 24

Eagle S was a crude oil and oil products tanker that sailed under the flag of the Cook Islands. It is the only ship operated by Caravella LLC-FZ, a company registered in the United Arab Emirates (UAE). It was originally built in China for the Singaporean company FR8 Holdings PTE Ltd in 2006, which operated it under the name FR8 Pride. Later the ship has also served under the names LR Mimosa and Norstar Intrepid.

== Description ==
Eagle S was a crude oil and oil products tanker with a deadweight tonnage of 74,035 tonnes (72,866 long tons) and 12 cargo tanks that have a combined volumetric capacity of 81,320 cubic metres (511,500 bbl) at 98% filling. The ship is 228.6 metres (750 ft 0 in) long, 32.3 metres (106 ft 0 in) wide, and has a displacement of 89,381 tonnes (87,969 long tons) when loaded to the maximum draught of 14.5 metres (47 ft 7 in). The ship has a crew of 24.

Like most oil tankers, Eagle S was powered by a single low-speed two-stroke crosshead diesel engine driving a fixed pitch propeller. The ship's five-cylinder MAN-B&W 5S60MC-C main engine, manufactured by Hudong Heavy Machinery under license, was rated at 11,300 kilowatts (15,200 hp) when running at 105 rpm. This propulsion system gave Eagle S a maximum speed of 14.5 knots (26.9 km/h; 16.7 mph). When running at a service speed of 12 knots (22 km/h; 14 mph), the ship burnt 35 tonnes (39 short tons) of fuel oil per day. In addition, the ship had three 900-kilowatt (1,200 hp) auxiliary diesel generators to produce electrical power.

The ship was built at New Century Shipyard in Jingjiang, China. It was laid down on 20 December 2004, launched on 28 August 2005, and delivered on 16 March 2006.

Eagle S began to be scrapped in Aliağa, Turkey in November 2025.

== Incidents ==
=== 2012 collision ===
On 2 May 2012, FR8 Pride collided with the mobile drill rig Rowan EXL I in the Aransas Pass after the tanker's engine had failed. The U.S. National Transportation Safety Board estimated the resulting damage to be 16–17 million US dollars.

=== 2014 oil spill ===
On 25 September 2014, the tanker, now under the name LR Mimosa and operated under charter by the Panamax International Shipping Corporation, cut connections to a Monobuoy terminal in Quintero Bay off Chile, causing an oil spill. An estimated 39 metric tons (38 long tons; 43 short tons) of crude oil entered Quintero Bay during the incident.

In late 2023, Eagle S was inspected at the Port of Tema in Ghana, two months after having been sold to Caravella LLC-FZ in the UAE. Survey inspectors listed 24 defects and shortcomings, which led to the ship's temporary detention. The vessel had to pass reinspection before a classification certificate could be issued.

=== 2024 cable-cutting incident ===
Early in the morning of 25 December 2024, Eagle S, now under management of the Peninsular Maritime India company and with an Indian safety management certificate from September 2024, left the Russian port of Ust-Luga with a load of unleaded gasoline, which was, according to press research, destined for Aliağa, Turkey. The captain was a 39-year-old Georgian national, who had joined the crew in October. At 10:26 GMT (12:26 Finland time), she crossed above the Estlink 2 submarine cable on the bed of the Gulf of Finland. At the same time, the Finnish electricity transmission grid operator, Fingrid, reported a power outage on the cable.

Early the next morning, the ship, which was believed to be part of the Russian shadow fleet, was ordered to enter Finnish territorial waters where it was boarded by Finnish police and border guards who took control of the vessel. She was then escorted to Porkkalanniemi, where she was found to be missing one of her anchors. On 28 December, Eagle S was moved to a position off Porvoo, near Helsinki, to help with the investigation.

Investigators checking the Indian Register of Shipping and found no valid insurance for the ship at the time of the incident, with the last policy (with Ingosstrakh) having expired in August 2024. Based on an anonymous source, Lloyd's List reported that Eagle S was, during a prior voyage, carrying additional electronic surveillance equipment to record information on NATO ships, equipment which had been removed upon arriving in Russia, and that an individual, who was not a seafarer, had been identified on board. On 31 December 2024, Detective Inspector Elina Katajamäki of the Central Criminal Police stated that the police had conducted an extensive investigation on board and found no surveillance equipment. The ship was not on the list of 79 vessels sanctioned by the European Union at the time.

By 29 December, Finnish investigators had documented the drag line on the seabed over "several tens of kilometers", but had to postpone the investigation due to bad weather. At this stage, they had not located the anchor missing from Eagle S.

On 30 December, an application was filed to the Helsinki District Court, in which the UAE-based shipping company of the Eagle S, Caravella, sought to overturn the seizure by the Finnish authorities. Maritime attorney Herman Ljungberg, representing the ship's crew, strongly criticised the actions of the authorities to Helsingin Sanomat based on his conversation with the ship's captain. Ljungberg claimed that, according to the captain, the situation was stressful and the crew were starving. He said that the crew had been interrogated without legal assistance, kept hungry and in one room, and not allowed to sleep. The allegations were denied by the police. The Helsinki District Court rejected the application on 3 January 2025.

On 31 December, out of a complement of 24 seamen, seven crewmembers suspected of criminal activities were forbidden to leave the country. Additionally, the police published pictures of the ship's hull below the waterline, showing chipped paint and bare metal. The damage is suspected to have been caused by the ship's own anchor chain. The number of crewmembers restricted by a travel ban was increased to eight by 2 January 2025, and a ninth crewmember was listed as a suspect by 13 January 2025.

In addition to the criminal case and port inspection detaining her, Fingrid initiated civil litigation for the cost of the submarine power cable repair. On 2 January, the company requested the seizure of Eagle S to secure its claims. The ship's cargo, 35,000 tonnes (34,000 long tons) of unleaded gasoline, was also seized to investigate a violation of sanctions. A Finnish customs enquiry judged by 16 January that the petrol and diesel carried on Eagle S were subject to the sanctions against Russia.

On 7 January 2025, the crew of a Swedish Armed Forces vessel, HSwMS Belos (A214), located the missing anchor of Eagle S at a depth of 80 metres (300 feet) towards the end of a 100 kilometres (62 mi) drag line on the course Eagle S had taken before. The 11,000 kg (24,251 lb) anchor was recovered and handed over to Finnish investigators. It showed damage, with one fluke missing.

A safety inspection report by Finnish authorities published on 8 January found 32 deficiencies with Eagle S. The report named several major shortcomings, like problems concerning fire safety, with doors not working properly, valves in the main firefighting pipelines stuck and errors in the alarm system. The tanker's S band radar did not work. The pump room for the ship's cargo had no working ventilation. Due to the poor condition of the tanker, the inspectors requested an ISM assessment, before the ship be allowed to leave.

On 13 January, Risto Lohi, head of the Finnish investigation, said that when the tanker was boarded the crew had been "poised to cut more cables".

An attempt by the proprietor, the company Caravella LLC-FZ, to get the recovered anchor back from investigators was dismissed by the Helsinki district court on 15 January. The company's Finnish attorney estimated the cost of running the tanker while sitting idle in Finnish waters to be €14,500 per day. He said his client should be reimbursed the money, and indicated that the company may be inclined to abandon the ship. On 22 January 2025, the courts ordered a further detention, this one indefinite, in response to damages claims by Elisa, Elering and Fingrid.

In late February 2025, Finland's authorities announced that Eagle S might soon be allowed to leave. According to press reports, some members of the Georgian and Indian crew might have to remain in Finland to stand trial.

On 11 August 2025, Finland filed charges of aggravated sabotage and aggravated interference with telecommunications against the captain, and the first and second officer of the Eagle S.

In 2025, Cook Islands authorities tracked the ownership of the vessel to a 42-year-old woman from Azerbaijan. Journalists suspected her to be a mere figurehead for the Russian Shadow Fleet.

== See also ==
- Nordic Warden
