= Vireši–Tallinn pipeline =

Gas pipeline interconnection between Latvia and Estonia

- Map of Vireši–Tallinn pipeline

Location
- Country: Estonia; Latvia
- Coordinates: 58°7′2″N 25°35′16″E
- Direction: south-north, north-south
- Start: Tallinn, Estonia
- Passes through: Estonian-Latvian boarder
- To: ?, Latvia

General information
- Type: Natural gas
- Partners: EG Võrguteenus; Latvijas Gāze
- Construction started: 1991/1992

Technical information
- Length: 290.4 km (180.4 mi)
- Maximum discharge: 7 million cubic metres per day (250 million cubic feet per day)
- Diameter: 700 mm (28 in)
- No. of compressor stations: 1
- Compressor stations: Vireši

Estonia–Latvia Interconnection (Vireši–Tallinn pipeline) is a natural gas pipeline interconnection between Estonia and Latvia. Its total length is 290.4 kilometres (180.4 mi), of which 202.4 kilometres (125.8 mi) is located in Estonia and 88 kilometres (55 mi) is located in Latvia. In Vireši, the pipeline is connected with Izborsk–Inčukalns pipeline, which provides for Estonia access to the Inčukalns underground gas storage. The pipeline has one compression station in Vireši and one metering station in Karksi.

The direction of gas flow is from Latvia to Estonia. There is a plan for upgrade to allow bidirectional gas flow.

== See also ==
- Energy in Estonia
