= Finngulf LNG =

Finngulf LNG was a liquefied natural gasterminal project in Ingå, Finland. It was an initiative by Finnish natural gas company Gasum. The project was on the list of projects submitted to be considered as potential EU projects of common interest in energy infrastructure. One of the criteria for the EU aid is that the terminal must service more than one EU Member State. This means that another prerequisite was the proposed Balticconnector pipeline, which would connect Estonian and Finnish gas grids.

From the terminal, gas would be injected into the Finnish natural gas network or transported in the form of LNG for use as vessel fuel or for industrial uses. The terminal area would also include a large LNG storage tank.

An environmental impact assessment report for the terminal was completed in spring 2013.

A full-scale terminal could be completed in 2018. In December 2013, the project management services contract was awarded to Neste Jacobs.

In October 2015, Gasum abandoned the project due to commercial viability. In 2023, the Inkoo LNG terminal began operating.

== See also ==
- Energy in Finland
