= Baltic LNG (disambiguation) =

Baltic LNG may refer to:

- Baltic LNG, a proposed LNG plant in Russia
- Finngulf LNG, a proposed LNG terminal in Finland
- Klaipėda LNG FSRU, an LNG terminal in Lithuania
- Świnoujście LNG terminal, an LNG terminal in Poland
