= Inkoo LNG terminal =

LNG terminal in Finland

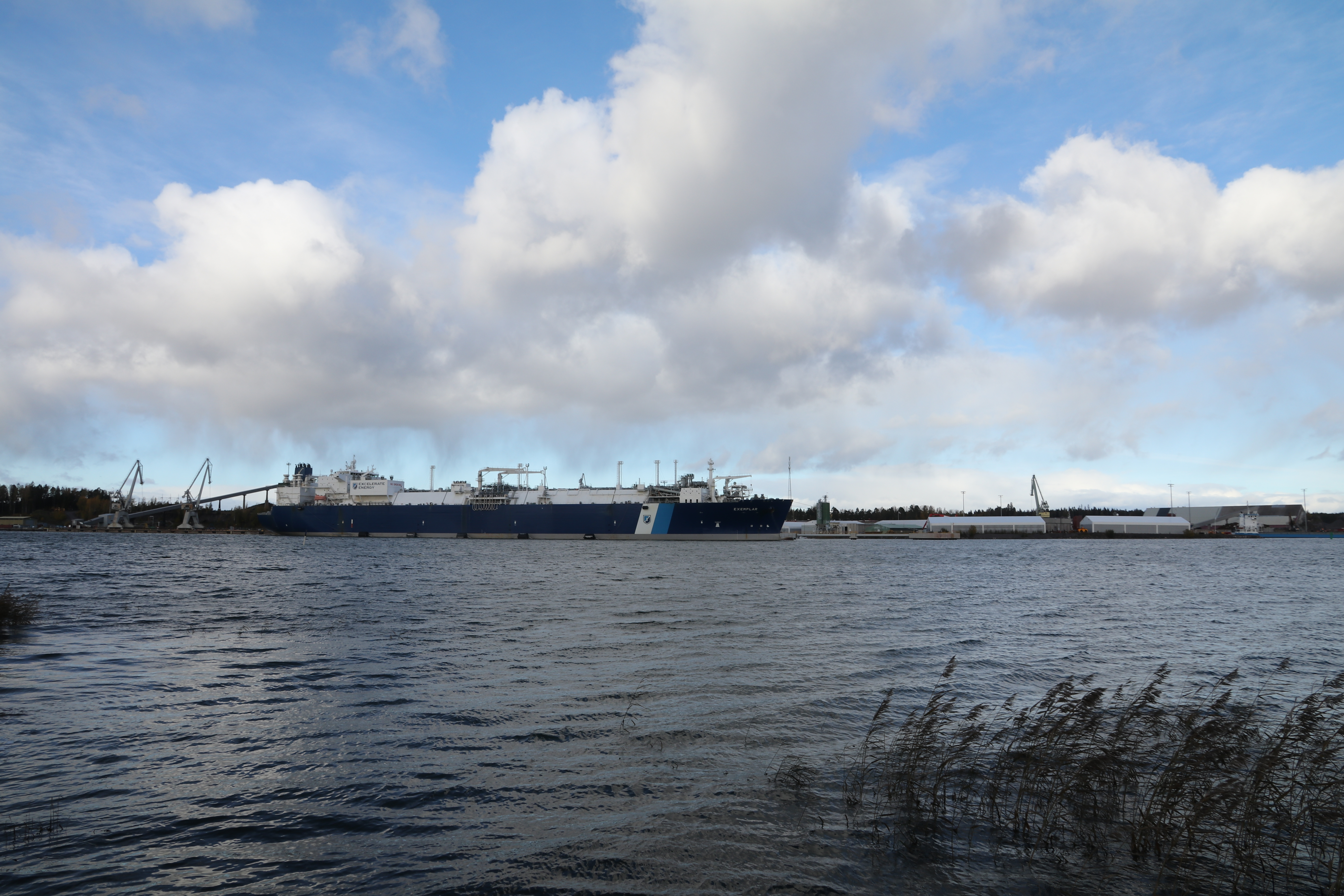
FSRU Exemplar at the port of Inkoo

Inkoo LNG terminal is a liquefied natural gas (LNG) shipping terminal, situated near Inkoo (Ingå), Finland on the Gulf of Finland. It became operational in January 2023, and received first gas in April 2023, with some shipments for Estonia. The floating regasification equipment and port facility was built to offload marine-shipped LNG to Finland following the cutoff of Russian pipeline gas in the aftermath of the 2022 Russian invasion of Ukraine, and will have the capability over time to supply gas to the Baltic countries as well.

Planning for an LNG port in Finland had been variously considered since the 2000s, but was accelerated following the global natural gas supply crisis. Inkoo LNG terminal is Finland's first LNG shipping terminal.

== History ==
The plans for building an LNG terminal in the deep-water port of Inkoo were finalized in June 2022, four months after the invasion of Ukraine by Russia, and the project began operation in January 2023. Previous attempts to build an LNG terminal for Finland were aborted before construction began.

An earlier proposed LNG project for Finland and Estonia was Finngulf LNG by the Finnish natural gas company Gasum. Conceived in the 2000s, with an environmental impact assessment completed in spring 2013, Gasum abandoned the project in October 2015 due to insufficient commercial viability.

After the Russian invasion of Ukraine in February 2022, the project rationale for building the Inkoo LNG terminal was principally to increase the security of natural gas supply to Finland. Reusing a particular property improved the project's economics on the port with an already-built pier—where a coal power plant had previously operated, which had been dismantled in 2020. Environmental impact assessments (EIA) had been completed on the property in 2014–2015. Still, the project was not built out due to reliance on Russian gas supplied by pipeline. Finland had begun importing gas from Russia in the 1970s during the Soviet era, utilizing two parallel Russia-Finland natural gas pipelines.

Construction of the port facility began in August 2022 and was completed in four months.

During 2022, Gasgrid Finland entered into a 10-year lease of approximately €460 million to utilize the regasification vessel FSRU Exemplar at Inkoo. FSRU Examplar is owned by the U.S. company Excelerate Energy.

== Description ==
The FSRU Exemplar regasification vessel is 291 m (955 ft) in length, 43 m (141 ft) in width, has a storage capacity of 68,000 t (75,000 tons) of LNG, with an energy content equivalence of 1050 GWh. Exemplar's evaporation capacity is 140 GWh/day and up to 40 TWh (5 billion cubic metres) per year, more than Finland's 25 TWh consumption per year.

The port is located less than 2 km (1.2 mi) from the Balticconnector bidirectional gas pipeline between Estonia and Finland that connects the two nations' gas grids.

== See also ==
- Klaipėda LNG terminal – LNG terminal in Lithuania
