= EE-S1 =

Submarine communications cable in Europe

- Owners: Arelion
- Landing points: 1. Kärdla (Estonia); 2. Tallinn (Estonia); 3. Stavsnäs (Sweden)
- Total length: 240 km
- Topology: Single path with 6 bidirectional lines
- Currently lit capacity: unknown
- Technology: Fibre Optic DWDM
- Date of first use: June of 1995

EE-S1 is a submarine communications cable between Sweden and Estonia. The cable is 240 km in length and it has three landing points – Kärdla (Estonia), Tallinn (Estonia) and Stavsnäs (Sweden). It became operational in June 1995. EE-S1 is owned by the Swedish pension fund AP-fonderna through its ownership in Arelion. Arelion was previously called Telia Carrier and was part of Telia Group.

== Cable damage ==
On the afternoon of 7 October 2023, the cable was damaged. Four of the total six fiberoptic cable pairs were totally destroyed and the remaining two were functional. The location of the damaged cables is 70–80 meters below the sea surface according to the Swedish Navy.

Just a few hours later, the Balticconnector gas pipeline between Estonia and Finland was ruptured. Another submarine communications cable between Finland and Estonia was damaged at approximately the same time. Politician Antti Kaikkonen was quoted saying "There are a bit too many coincidental coincidences for it to be coincidental".

On 17 October 2023, the damage was made public when the Swedish government reported the incident.

In Estonia, investigation is carried out by the Estonian Internal Security Service (KAPO), the Prosecutor's Office and Keskkriminaalpolitsei, and by the National Bureau of Investigation (Keskusrikospoliisi) in Finland. Swedish submarine rescue ship HSwMS Belos (A214) was assisting in the investigation which revealed that the damage was clearly man-made.

Russian cargo ship Sevmorput and Chinese cargo ship Newnew Polar Bear were suspected of involvement in the incident. Both ships travelled near EE-S1 at precisely the time the damage occurred. Sevmorput's owner Rosatom denied involvement.

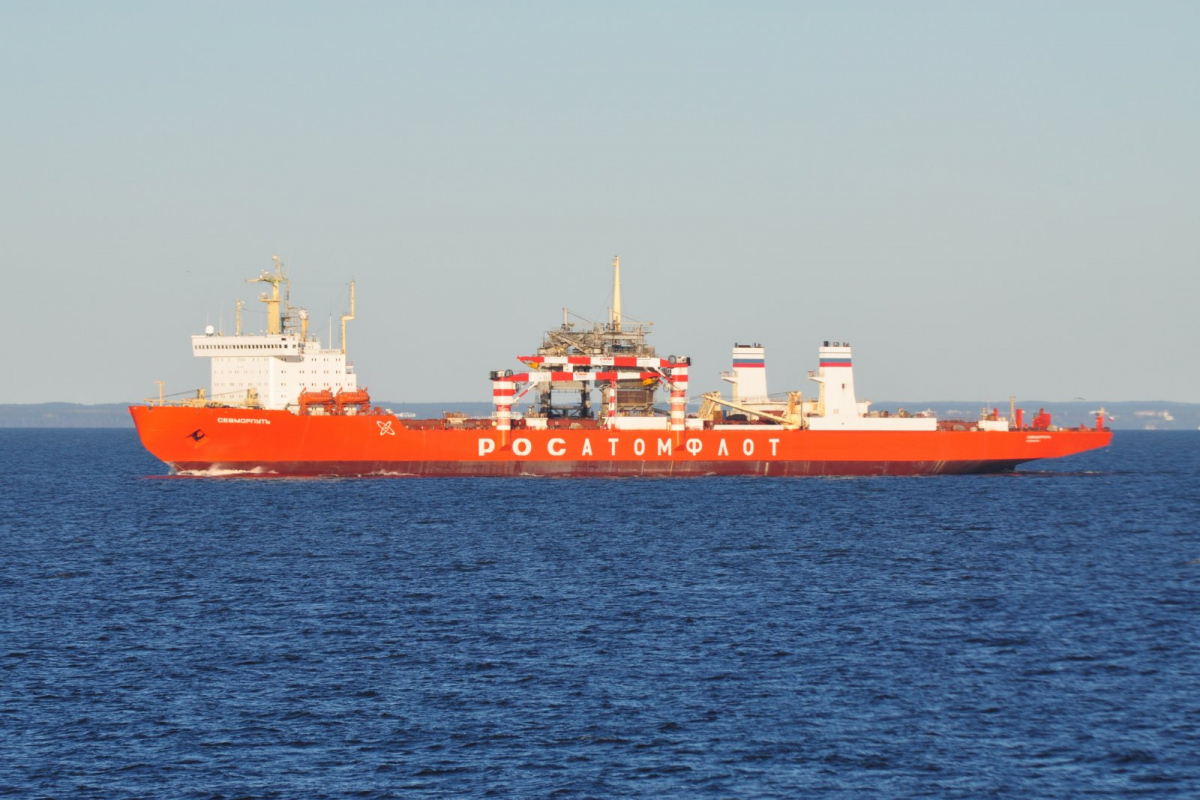
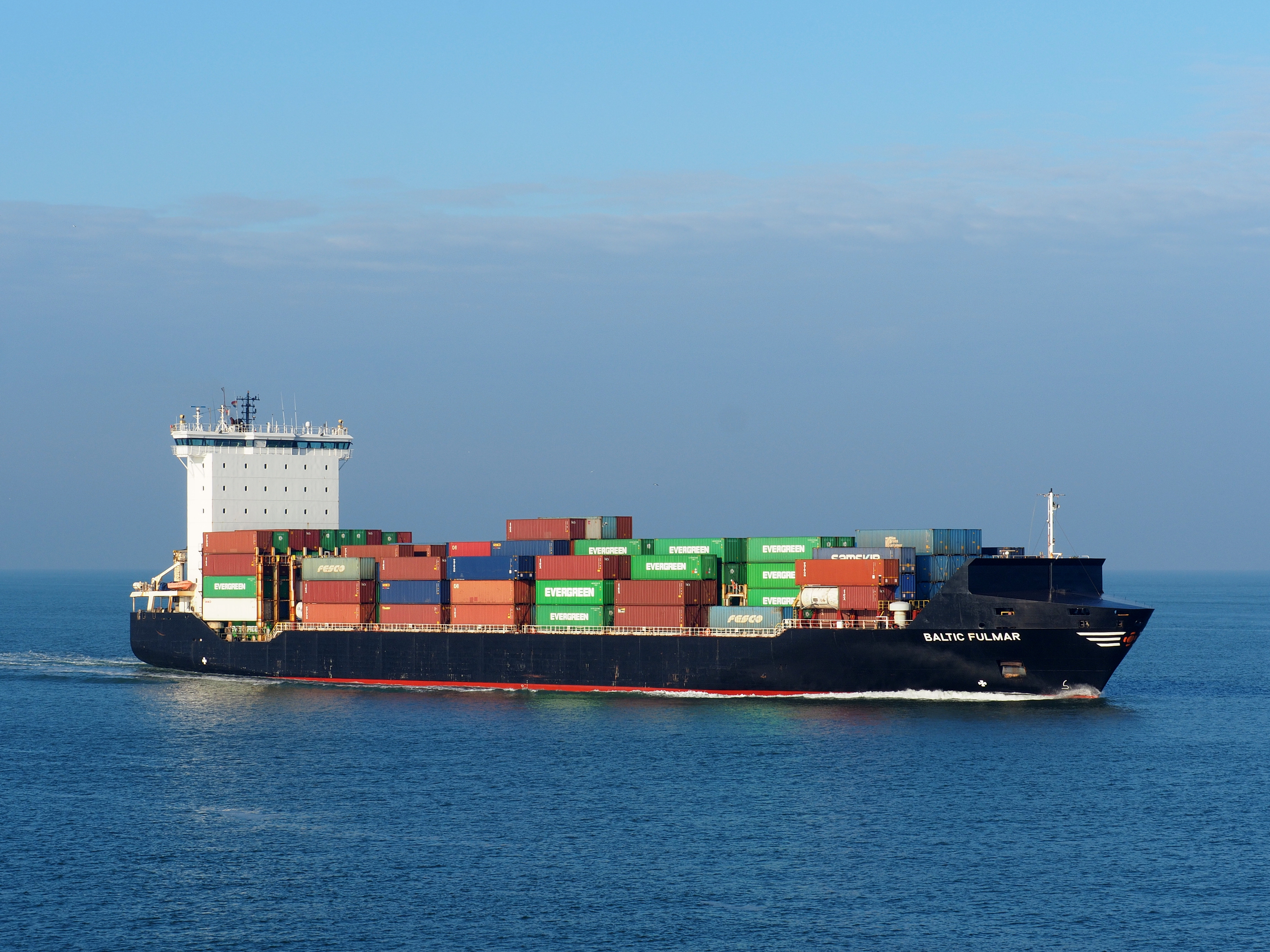
The two ships suspected of causing the damage, left to right: Sevmorput, Newnew Polar Bear

The same two ships also travelled near the Balticconnector precisely at the time of damage, when Norwegian seismic institute Norsar detected seismic waves. The same two ships also travelled near the other damaged portion of EE-S1 between Helsinki and Tallinn.

After the incidents, both ships travelled in pair to Northern Norway, an area dense with undersea cables and gas pipelines. Norwegian Armed Forces reprioritised part of its activities to maritime surveillance. The seas in Northern Norway are heavily patrolled, but the Norwegian Armed Forces declined to provide any comments to the media.

According to Rostelecom, during this incident, Russian optical cable, connecting Kaliningrad and St Petersburg, was also damaged.

== Conclusions ==
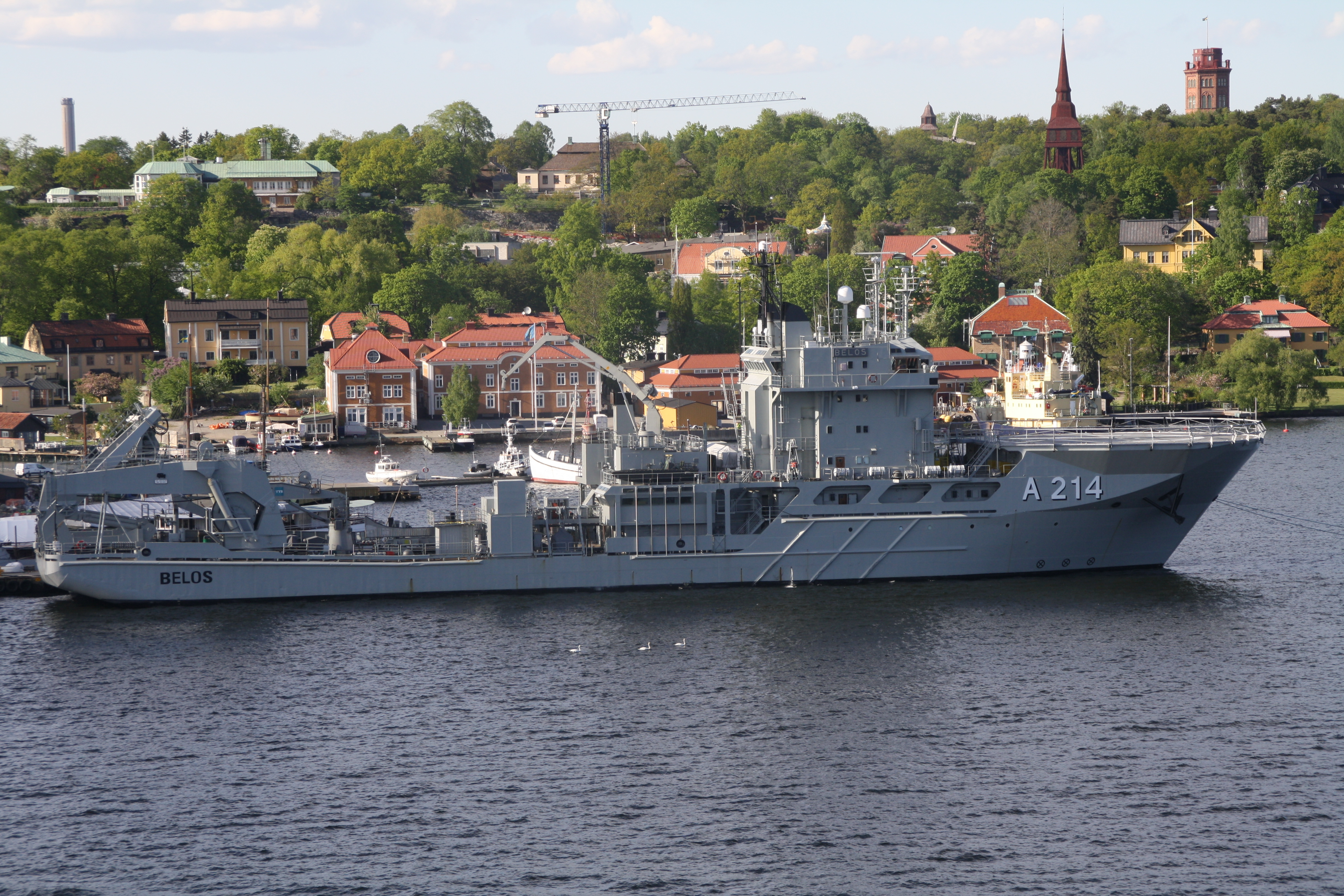
HSwMS Belos (A214) which assisted in the investigation

Investigation concluded that the cable was damaged by external force, with clear marks visible on the seafloor next to the cable.

== See also ==
- Cable landing point
- List of domestic submarine communications cables
- List of international submarine communications cables
- Loaded submarine cable
- 2024 Baltic Sea submarine cable disruptions
