= Estlink =

Submarine power cables between Estonia and Finland

Estlink 1
- Location of Estlink 1

Location
- Country: Estonia, Finland
- General direction: north–south
- From: Harku converter station, Estonia 59°23′5″N 24°33′37″E
- Passes through: Gulf of Finland
- To: Espoo converter station, Finland 60°12′14″N 24°33′06″E

Ownership information
- Partners: Elering; Fingrid

Construction information
- Cable manufacturer: ABB
- Cable installer: Global Marine Systems
- Cable layer: CS Sovereign
- Substation manufacturer: ABB
- Substation installer: ABB
- Construction started: 2006
- Commissioned: 2006

Technical information
- Type: Submarine power cable
- Current type: HVDC
- Total length: 105 km (65 mi)
- Capacity: 350 MW
- AC voltage: 330 kV (Estonia), 400 kV (Finland)
- DC voltage: ±150 kV
- No. of poles: 2

Estlink 2
- Location of Estlink 2

Location
- Country: Estonia, Finland
- General direction: south–north–south (bidirectional)
- From: Püssi converter station, Estonia 59°22′02″N 27°03′50″E
- Passes through: Gulf of Finland
- To: Anttila converter station, Finland 60°22′36″N 25°22′01″E

Ownership information
- Partners: Elering; Fingrid

Construction information
- Cable manufacturer: Nexans
- Cable installer: Nexans
- Cable layer: C/S Nexans Skagerrak
- Substation manufacturer: Siemens
- Substation installer: Siemens
- Contractors: Empower Oy
- Commissioned: 2014

Technical information
- Type: subsea cable, overhead line
- Current type: HVDC
- Total length: 171 km (106 mi)
- Capacity: 650 MW
- AC voltage: 330 kV (Estonia), 400 kV (Finland)
- DC voltage: 450 kV
- No. of poles: 1

Estlink is a set of HVDC submarine power cables between Estonia and Finland. Estlink 1 was the first interconnection between the Baltic and Nordic electricity markets followed by Estlink 2 in 2014. The main purpose of the Estlink connection is to secure power supply in both regions to integrate the Baltic and Nordic energy markets.

== Estlink 1 ==
=== History ===
First plans for a submarine power cable between the Baltic and the Nordic regions were proposed in 1990s. Negotiations between Eesti Energia, Pohjolan Voima, Helsingin Energia, Graninge (now E.ON Sverige), Latvenergo, Statkraft and TXE Nordic Energy, a subsidiary of TXU (now Energy Future Holdings Corporation) started In 1999, and on 9 October 2001 a contract was signed in Tallinn. However, only after the harsh winter of 2002–2003 which resulted in an increased demand for power, the project of the submarine cable between Estonia and Finland got a boost. The letter of intention for underwater sea cable was signed between Eesti Energia, Pohjolan Voima, Helsingin Energia and Latvenergo on 31 March 2003. In May 2004, the Lithuanian power company Lietuvos Energija agreed to participate in the project, shortly after which the project company AS Nordic Energy Link was established. On 29 April 2005, the Estlink project was launched. Construction of Harku converter station and land cable installation begins on 5 April 2006. The submarine cable was laid in September 2006. The Estlink cable was inaugurated on 4 December 2006 and it became fully operational on 5 January 2007.

The Estlink 1 cable was operated by AS Nordic Energy Link company, founded by Baltic and Finnish power companies. The main shareholder was Eesti Energia with 39.9% of the shares, Latvenergo and Lietuvos Energija had 25% each, and the remaining 10.1% was divided between Pohjolan Voima and Helsingin Energia (operating through their joint project company Finestlink). On 30 December 2013 the interconnector was sold to the transmission system operators Elering and Fingrid.

=== Description ===
The 105 kilometres (65 mi) long (including 74 kilometres (46 mi) under water) +/-150 kV, 350 MW HVDC link cable is connected to the Estonian electrical system at the Harku 330 kV converter station and to the Finnish transmission network at Espoo 400 kV converter station in Järvikylä using HVDC Light transmission technology. The installation of land cable began on 4 May 2006 in Harku. The submarine cable was laid on the seabed of the Gulf of Finland in the autumn of 2006. The cable's maximum depth on the seabed is 100 metres (330 ft).

The cable was manufactured by ABB. The submarine cable was laid by Global Marine Systems using the CS Sovereign. The project cost €110 million.

=== Sites ===
Name	Coordinates
Estonia – Harku	59°23′5″N 24°33′37″E
Finland – Espoo	60°12′14″N 24°33′06″E

== Estlink 2 ==
=== History ===
A preliminary agreement on EstLink 2 was signed between Elering and Fingrid on 15 February 2010 in Tallinn. Capital investment decision by Fingrid was made on 20 May 2010. A construction agreement was signed on 1 November 2010.

On 23 December 2010, the contract to manufacture and install the subsea and underground cables was awarded to Nexans, the contract to build converter stations was awarded to Siemens, the contract to build the Nikuviken cable terminal station and to expand the Anttila substation in Finland was awarded to Empower Oy, and the contract to build the transmission line between Anttila and Nikuviken was awarded to ETDE, a part of Bouygues.

Laying of the cable started on 15 October 2012 and it is laid by the cable ship Nexans Skagerrak. The cable testing started on 22 October 2013. A trial operation started on 6 December 2013 and continued until 6 February 2014 after which it started commercial operations. It was officially inaugurated on 6 March 2014.

The cable experienced an outage on 26 January 2024 originating from the Estonian coast. After repair work was concluded, the connection resumed commercial operation on 4 September 2024.

==== Incident in December 2024 ====
On 25 December 2024, an unplanned outage in Estlink 2 reduced the Estonia–Finland cross-border capacity from 1,016 MW to 358 MW. Fingrid expects the outage to last until August 2025. At the time of the outage, electricity was flowing from Finland to Estonia at a rate of 658 MW. Concerns about potential sabotage have arisen due to recent outages in the Baltic Sea region, although subsea cables are also prone to technical malfunctions and accidents. Finnish Prime Minister Petteri Orpo confirmed that authorities were investigating the incident.

At early evening, the Finnish Border Guard escorted the tanker Eagle S, a part of Russia's shadow fleet according to Lloyd's List, to Porkkalanniemi. By early morning on 26 December, both vessels were still near Porkkala.

A statement released by the European Commission described the Eagle S as part of Russia's shadow fleet.

Repair was finished and link brought back online on June 18, 2025.

=== Description ===
The total length of Estlink 2 is 171 kilometres (106 mi), including a 145-kilometre (90 mi) long offshore cable, a 12-kilometre (7.5 mi) long onshore cable in Estonia, and 14 kilometres (8.7 mi) of overhead lines in Finland. The 12-kilometre (7.5 mi) long underground cable starts at the Püssi substation and runs the coast of the Gulf of Finland at Aseri. From there the 145-kilometre (90 mi) long offshore cable runs to the Nikuviken cable terminal station in Finland. The Nikuviken cable terminal station is connected with the Attila converter station by the 14-kilometre (8.7 mi) long overhead line, which is installed on 63 pylons.

Estlink 2 is a classic bidirectional monopolar high-voltage direct current connection with line-commutated converter thyristors. Its maximum transmission rate is 650 MW and it operates with a voltage of 450 kV. Its estimated cost was about €320 million, of which converter stations cost €100 million and cable €180 million. The European Commission has decided to allocate €100 million to the project.

=== Sites ===
Name	Coordinates
Estonia – Püssi Static Inverter Plant	59°22′13″N 27°04′05″E
Finland – Nikuviken Cable Terminal	60°17′34″N 25°31′41″E
Finland – Anttila Static Inverter Plant	60°22′36″N 25°22′01″E

=== Waypoints of overhead line in Finland ===
List of waypoints
- 60.3740807°N 25.3713637°E
- 60.3748047°N 25.3761005°E
- 60.3758892°N 25.3802901°E
- 60.3660089°N 25.3950584°E
- 60.3659771°N 25.3964102°E
- 60.3274111°N 25.4410851°E
- 60.321972°N 25.4483002°E
- 60.3166594°N 25.4591846°E
- 60.3119411°N 25.4737275°E
- 60.310246°N 25.4807388°E
- 60.3091885°N 25.4883134°E
- 60.309028°N 25.492082°E
- 60.3040652°N 25.4932272°E
- 60.302949°N 25.4970628°E
- 60.3013704°N 25.5006945°E
- 60.2975138°N 25.4971486°E
- 60.2939544°N 25.4985594°E
- 60.2921387°N 25.5068743°E
- 60.2928034°N 25.5138695°E
- 60.2925827°N 25.5266958°E

== Estlink 3 ==
On June 28, 2022, Elering and Fingrid signed a memorandum of understanding to begin planning for a third submarine cable, EstLink3, with a capacity of up to 1000 MW, expected to be completed by 2035.

== See also ==
- Balticconnector (gas pipeline between Estonia and Finland)
- NordBalt (between Lithuania and Sweden)
- Fenno-Skan (between Finland and Sweden)
- Baltic Cable (between Germany and Sweden)
- SwePol (between Poland and Sweden)
- List of HVDC projects
- 2024 Baltic Sea submarine cable disruptions
