= IGU =

IGU can stand for:

- Foz do Iguaçu International Airport (IATA airport code)
- Indian Golf Union
- Insulated Glazing Unit
- International Gas Union
- International Geographical Union
