= Newnew Polar Bear =

Container ship built in 2005

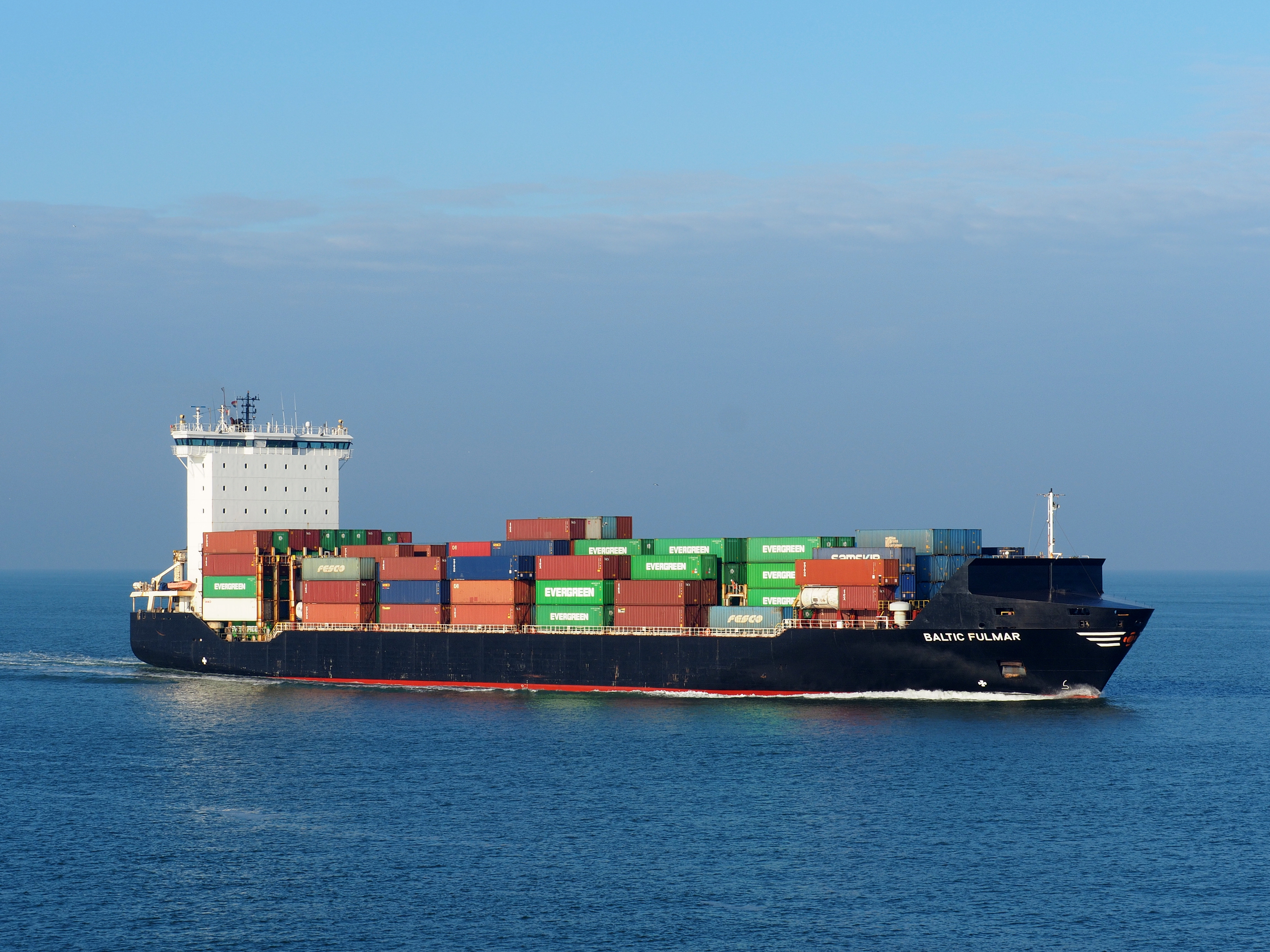
- The ship photographed as Baltic Fulmar outside the Port of Rotterdam in 2020

History
- Name: Reinbek (as built); Cast Prestige (2005–2006); Reinbek (2006–2017); Baltic Fulmar (2017–2023); Newnew Polar Bear (2023–2025); Belle Aries (2025–present)
- Owner: Hansa Hamburg Shipping Company (2005–2017); Bernhard Schulte Shipmanagement (2017–2023); Hainan Xin Xin Yang Shipping (2023–present)
- Port of registry: Hamburg, Germany (2005–2006); London, United Kingdom (2006–2010); Monrovia, Liberia (2010–2014); Valletta, Malta (2014–2016); Monrovia, Liberia (2016–2017); Limassol, Cyprus (2017–2023); Hong Kong, China (2023–2025); Panama City, Panama (2025–present)
- Ordered: December 2003
- Builder: Jos.L. Meyer Werft (Papenburg, Germany)
- Yard number: 672
- Laid down: 24 June 2004
- Launched: 29 December 2004
- Completed: 11 March 2005
- In service: 2005–present
- Identification: IMO number: 9313204; MMSI number: 477893800; Call sign: VRVQ4
- Status: In service

General characteristics
- Type: Eilbek-class container ship
- Tonnage: 16,324 GT; 6,450 NT; 15,952 DWT
- Displacement: 23,847 t (23,470 long tons)
- Length: 169.0 m (554.5 ft)
- Beam: 27.2 m (89 ft)
- Draught: 9.0 m (29.5 ft)
- Ice class: 1A Super
- Installed power: MAN B&W 8S50MC-C (12,640 kW)
- Propulsion: Single shaft; controllable pitch propeller; Bow thruster (950 kW) and stern thruster (650 kW)
- Speed: 20 knots (37 km/h; 23 mph)
- Capacity: 1,620 TEU
- Crew: 17 crew; 12 passengers

Newnew Polar Bear is the former name of a feeder container ship that damaged the Balticconnector natural gas pipeline in the Gulf of Finland in October 2023 by dragging its anchor for several hundred nautical miles.

== Description ==
Newnew Polar Bear is a fully-cellular feeder container ship with a container capacity of 1,620 twenty-foot equivalent units (TEU) and a deadweight tonnage of 15,952 tons. The ship is 169 metres (554 ft) long, 27.2 metres (89 ft) wide, and has a displacement of 23,847 tonnes (23,470 long tons) when loaded to the maximum draught of 9 metres (30 ft). The ship has a crew of 17 and berthing for up to 12 passengers in six cabins.

Newnew Polar Bear is powered by a single low-speed two-stroke crosshead diesel engine driving a controllable pitch propeller. The ship's eight-cylinder MAN B&W 8S50MC-C is rated at 12,640 kW (16,950 hp) and is capable of propelling it at a speed of 20 knots (37 km/h; 23 mph). In addition, the ship has three 880 kW (1,180 hp) 12-cylinder Cummins KTA-38-M auxiliary generators to produce electrical power. For maneuvering at ports, Newnew Polar Bear has a 950 kW (1,270 hp) bow thruster and a 650 kW (870 hp) stern thruster.

The ship was built to the highest Finnish-Swedish ice class of 1A Super.

== History ==
=== Construction ===
The ship was the second of four Eilbek-class feeder container ships commissioned by the German shipowner Hansa Hamburg Shipping International in the early 2000s. The ship was laid down at Jos.L. Meyer Werft shipyard in Papenburg, Germany, on 24 June 2004, launched on 29 December 2004, and delivered on 11 March 2005.

=== Career ===
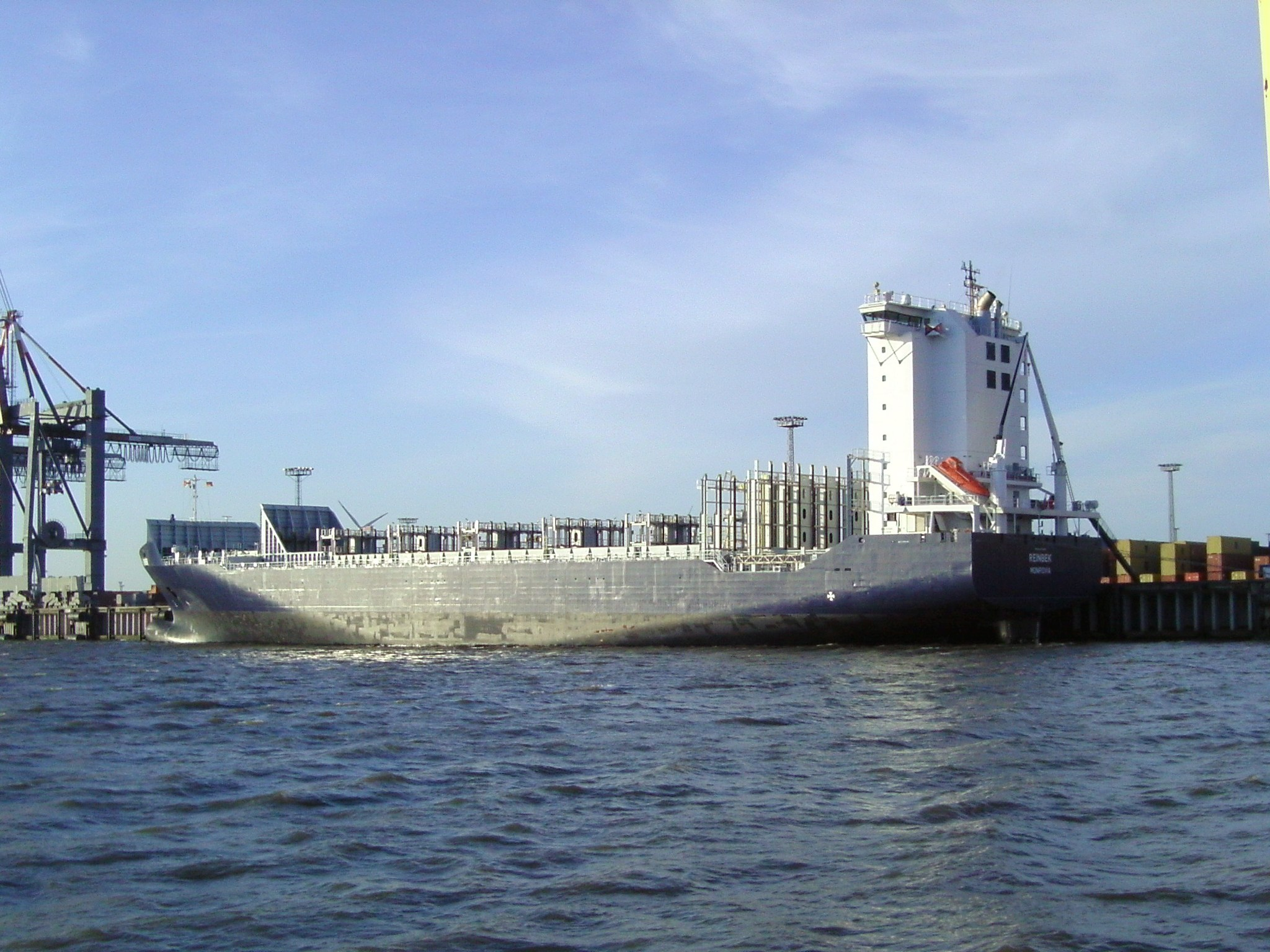
Reinbek in Bremerhaven, Germany, in 2010

While originally named Reinbek, the ship was renamed Cast Prestige shortly after delivery and chartered by the Canadian operator CP Ships for service between Canada and northwestern Europe under the German flag until April 2006.

After reverting to its original name, Reinbek, the ship was chartered by Hapag-Lloyd for the company's EEX Service between Mediterranean and Continental European ports. This was followed by charters to Mediterranean Shipping Company (MSC), Team Lines, Delphis, and Unifeeder. During this time, the ship was reflagged first to United Kingdom in 2006, Liberia in 2010, Malta in 2014, and then back to Liberia in 2016.

In mid-April 2017, Reinbek's ownership was transferred to Bernhard Schulte Shipmanagement and the ship was reflagged to Cyprus. Shortly thereafter, Reinbek was renamed Baltic Fulmar. The charter with Unifeeder continued and was later followed by CMA CGM.

In June 2023, Baltic Fulmar was sold to the Chinese shipowner Hainan Xin Xin Yang Shipping, reflagged to Hong Kong, and renamed Newnew Polar Bear. In

In October 2023, the ship completed a round trip through the Northern Sea Route from Russia to China and back under NewNew Shipping Line. A regular service is planned.

In 2025, the ship was renamed Belle Aries and reflagged to Panama.

== Damage to undersea infrastructure ==
In October 2023, Newnew Polar Bear became one of the ships suspected by Finnish police of damaging the Balticconnector natural gas pipeline and telecommunication cables that occurred in the Gulf of Finland, between Finland and Estonia, on 7 October. Another ship was the Russian nuclear-powered cargo ship Sevmorput.

Both ships are also suspected of possible involvement in damage to EE-S1, a submarine communications cable between Sweden and Estonia.

After sailing out of the Baltic Sea, Newnew Polar Bear was photographed arriving in the port of Arkhangelsk with the port side anchor seemingly missing on 22 October. On 24 October, the Finnish National Bureau of Investigation announced that they had retrieved an anchor embedded in the seabed next to the damaged pipeline in co-operation with the Finnish Navy and Finnish Border Guard, and that Newnew Polar Bear was the prime suspect for the incident.

In August 2024, an internal Chinese investigation indicated that the ship was indeed responsible for the damage, claiming it was an accident due to heavy weather rather than intentional sabotage. In May 2025, the ship's captain was remanded in custody in Hong Kong for the incident. The charges against captain Wan Wenguo were dropped by prosecutors in November 2026. After release from custody it was anticipated that he would be deported to China.
