= Balticconnector =

Gas pipeline between Estonia and Finland

- Map of Balticconnector

Location
- Country: Finland; Estonia
- Direction: north–south–north (bidirectional)
- Start: Ingå, Finland (offshore Section)
- Passes through: Gulf of Finland
- To: Paldiski, Estonia (offshore Section)

General information
- Type: natural gas
- Partners: Elering; Baltic Connector OY
- Operator: Gasgrid Finland and Elering
- Pipe manufacturer: Corinth Pipeworks Pipe Industry SA
- Pipe installer: Allseas
- Pipe layer: Lorelay
- Construction started: 8 June 2018
- Commissioned: 11 December 2019

Technical information
- Length: 151 km (94 mi)
- Maximum discharge: 2.6 billion cubic metres per annum (92×10^{9} cu ft/a)
- Diameter: 500–700 mm (20–28 in)
- No. of compressor stations: 2

Balticconnector is a bi-directional natural gas pipeline between Ingå, Finland and Paldiski, Estonia operated by Gasgrid Finland and Elering. It connects the Estonian and Finnish gas grids, and provides Finland with access to the Inčukalns underground gas storage facility in Latvia.

The subsea pipeline and a nearby data cable were damaged in October 2023. The pipeline was repaired and began operation again after six months. The Chinese authorities reported that the anchor of the Hong Kong-flagged ship NewNew Polar Bear was responsible for breaking the pipeline. The Chinese authorities stated it was an accident, while "both the Estonian and Finnish inquiries are ongoing." The damage to the pipeline did not result in any critical consequences, as Estonia could obtain gas from other pipelines and gas only accounts for 5% of Finland’s energy consumption.

== Technical description ==
The project consists of 77 kilometres (48 mi) of a bi-directional offshore pipeline between Ingå in Finland and Paldiski in Estonia, 21 kilometres (13 mi) of onshore pipeline in Finland between Ingå and Siuntio, and 55 kilometres (34 mi) of onshore pipeline in Estonia between Paldiski and Kiili. There are also metering and compressor stations in Ingå and in Kersalu, Estonia. The offshore part is operated jointly by Elering and Baltic Connector, while onshore sections of the pipeline will be developed separately by each party. Originally, there was also a proposal for alternative 140-kilometre (87 mi) long route from Vuosaari (district of Helsinki) to Paldiski.

The offshore section and the Finnish onshore section use 500 millimetres (20 in) pipes with an operating pressure of 80 bars (8,000 kPa). The Estonian onshore section uses a 700-millimetre (28 in) pipe with an operating pressure of 55 bars (5,500 kPa). In Estonia the pipeline is connected to the existing 700-millimetre (28 in) transmission pipeline from Latvia, which will be enhanced. The initial capacity of pipeline is 0.9 billion cubic metres per annum (32 billion cubic feet per annum). Later, it will increase up to 2.6 billion cubic metres per annum (92 billion cubic feet per annum). The pipeline cost €300 million, of which 206 million were financed by the European Commission.

The onshore section in Estonia was built by EG Ehitus AS, a subsidiary of Eesti Gaas, and the offshore section was built by Allseas. The offshore pipeline was laid by the pipe-laying vessel Lorelay. Pipes were supplied by Corinth Pipeworks Pipe Industry S.A., Greece.

=== Critical maritime infrastructure ===
The Balticconnector pipeline and the cables damaged along with it, is categorized as critical maritime infrastructure (CMI). Critical maritime infrastructure covers objects like ports, windfarms, cables and pipelines. This infrastructure is categorized as critical because modern societies are dependent on them in order to supply important resources like energy, food, or communication. Although this infrastructure is deemed critical, it has historically had very little protection due to the difficulty of monitoring these enormous distances that the pipes cover, as well as them being subsea, making them impossible to guard from the surface or airspace. The damage of this type of infrastructure is relatively common, and stems from nature phenomena, such as tsunamis, or routine maritime activity related to fishing and shipping. Deliberate interference with this type of critical maritime infrastructure remains less prominent until 2022 where The Nordstream sabotage and Balticonnector acts as central catalysts for contemporary critical maritime infrastructure protection agenda.

== History ==
The project was proposed originally by the Finnish natural gas company Gasum in cooperation with Eesti Gaas of Estonia. After implementation of the EU third energy package, EG Võrguteenus, a former subsidiary of Eesti Gaas, replaced the latter. Later EG Võrguteenus was acquired by, and became a part of the Estonian transmission system operator Elering. In October 2015, Gasum abandoned the project due to commercial viability. It was replaced by the Finnish state-owned company Baltic Connector OY.

The feasibility study was completed in May 2007. A preliminary environmental impact assessment programme was done in 2010. In 2010, the European Commission financed the investigation of possibilities to create more diversified natural gas grid within the Baltic Sea Region, which included also the Balticconnector project. The seabed studies started in November 2013. In 2016 the project received a grant form the European Union support program Connecting Europe Facility (CEF) because the project was categorized as an EU Project of Common Interest (CPI). The interconnector was seen as a prospect to end Finland's isolation from the European gas network, to secure gas supply and increase the energy integration in the Baltic region. The project received a €187,5 million grant from the CEF which covered 75% of the construction cost.

The construction agreement was signed between Elering and Baltic Connector on 17 October 2016. The cornerstone of the pipeline was laid on 8 June 2018 in Ingå. The ceremony was attended by Minister of Economic Affairs and Infrastructure of Estonia Kadri Simson, Minister of the Environment and Energy of Finland Kimmo Tiilikainen, European Commission member Jyrki Katainen and the managers of Elering and Baltic Connector Oy. Laying the offshore pipeline started on 20 May 2019 and was completed on 24 June 2019. Shielding of the offshore section were completed by 12 July 2019.

The onshore section in Estonia was filled with gas on 23 October 2019 and the offshore section was filled with gas on 27 November 2019. The pipeline was inaugurated on 11 December 2019 by ceremonies in Helsinki and Paldiski. The ceremonies were attended by presidents of Estonia and Finland Kersti Kaljulaid and Sauli Niinistö, ministers of economy Taavi Aas and Mika Lintilä, Deputy Director-General of European Commission Energy Directorate Klaus-Dieter Borchardt and the managers of Elering and Baltic Connector Oy.

Balticconnector started commercial operations on 1 January 2020. During the first month of operation it supplied over a third of Finnish gas demand, 885 GWh. By comparison, the domestic Estonian consumption was 565 GWh.

After the commissioning of a gas interconnection between Poland and Lithuania in 2022, Estonia and (via the Balticconnector) Finland have been connected to the Polish and internal EU gas markets, and vice versa; Estonia received LNG shipments via Inkoo LNG terminal in May 2023.

In the wake of the February 2022 Russian invasion of Ukraine, the northeastern European states decided to sanction the Russian Federation and their gas supply. Past supply to the Balticconnector was from Russia but from 2023 LSEG data showed the shipping terminals at Klaipėda and Ingå favoured gas from the United States and Norway. In June 2024 the EU officially sanctioned Russian LNG supply in their 14th package.

== 2023 damage incident ==
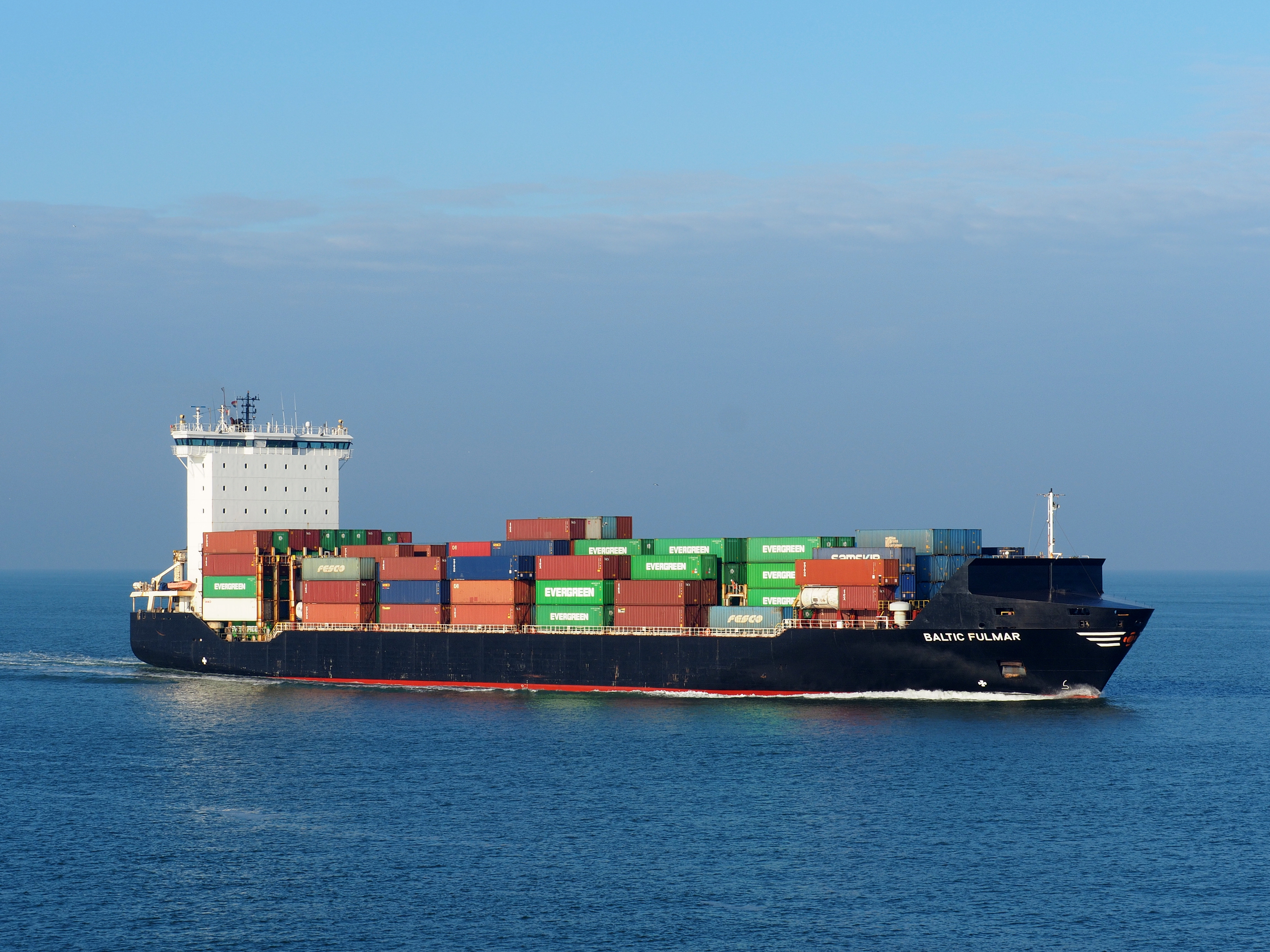
Newnew Polar Bear (previously Baltic Fulmar) caused the damaging of the undersea infrastructure.

As of 2023, the pipeline was transporting 30 GWh/day from Finland to Estonia. On 8 October 2023, around 02:00 local time, the two operating companies Gasgrid Finland and Elering (Estonia) noticed a sudden drop in pressure in the line, from 34.5 bar to 12 bar, and then to 6 bar. The operators closed the valves to stop the flow. They later discovered a leak caused by a damaged pipe in the sea. The EE-S1 telecoms cable, near the pipeline, was also damaged, along with a Russian and a Estonia-Finnish submarine cable .

On 10 October 2023, the Finnish government announced that the damage to the pipeline may have been deliberate and caused by "external activity". The leak was investigated by the Finnish Border Guard and the Finnish Security Intelligence Service. Norwegian seismological institute NORSAR reported that it detected a "probable explosion" 40 km north of Paldiski (roughly where Balticconnector and Nord Stream intersect) on the 8 October at 01:20 local time. A few days later investigators stated the damage "appears to have been mechanical, not an explosion".

On 11 October 2023, an Estonian Navy commander stated that Finnish images of the damage showed the pipeline's concrete cover had been broken off and the pipeline was badly damaged on one side and out of position. A Finnish member of the European Centre of Excellence for Countering Hybrid Threats suggested that one possibility was that a ship's anchor had dragged over the pipeline. Five large ships had been near the pipeline shortly before the incident. Finland's National Bureau of Investigations opened an investigation into the potential "intentional damaging" of the pipeline by the Chinese vessel in response.

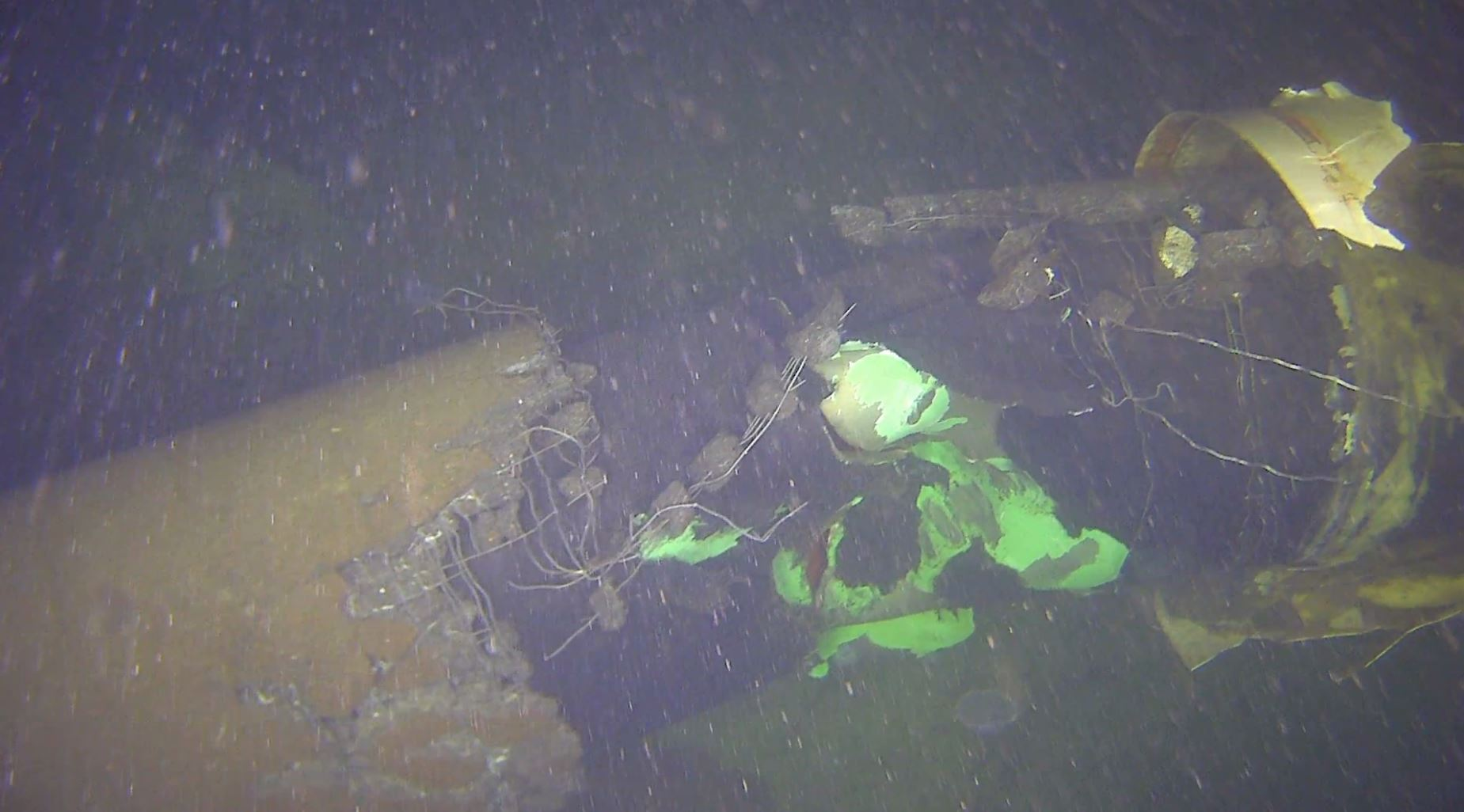
Underwater damage photographed in October 2023.

On 21 October 2023, Finnish authorities reported that the Chinese ship Newnew Polar Bear was in the area at the time of the incident and that the role of this ship was being investigated. The Newnew Polar Bear was accompanied by the Russian nuclear-powered container ship Sevmorput, however, Finnish authorities did not state that this container ship caused the physical damage to the pipeline. On 24 October 2023, it was reported that Finnish authorities had observed gouges in the seabed starting on one side of the pipeline and ending the other side, near where they found a damaged ship's anchor, missing much of one fluke.A photo of the ship from October 22, 2023 in the Russian Arctic port Arkhangelsk shows that the ship is missing its portside anchor. Newnew Polar Bear sailed through the Gulf of Finland on 24 October 2023. As the vessel was sailing in territorial waters, the Finnish authorities were unable to stop the ship, in spite of them requesting to stop.

During the outage, gas supply to the Finnish gas network is based on the FSRU Exemplar, a floating regasification plant with a capacity of 40 TWh/year moored at the port of Inkoo. Gas can also be supplied from the LNG terminal in Hamina at 6 GWh/day and from biogas plants. The pipeline operators state that repairs will take at least five months, with an earliest projected restart in April 2024.

The offshore pipeline repair project was led by Norwegian energy major Equinor, on behalf of operators Gasgrid Finland and Estonian electricity transmission grid operator Elering. The pipeline resumed commercial operation after repairs were completed on 22 April 2024.

On 12 August 2024, the Chinese government admitted the incident was the fault of NewNew Shipping Line "by accident" caused by "a strong storm". Estonian investigating authorities had submitted a request to the Chinese government "to gather evidence from the vessel and its crew" but this request had still to be permitted.

On 8 May 2025, the captain of the ship was reportedly remanded in custody in Hong Kong. He is suspected of one count of criminal damage, two counts of violation of local marine by-laws, and of breaching navigation safety protocols. The case was scheduled to be heard in Hong Kong courts in early 2027, and the captain denied the charges. The charges against captain Wan Wenguo were dropped by prosecutors in November 2026, after there had been problems contacting former crew on mainland China as witnesses. According to South China Morning Post, after release from custody it was anticipated that he would be 'deported to China'.

=== Legal dimension ===
The interconnector was damaged in Finland's exclusive economic zone (EEZ). The EEZ is defined by the treaty United Nations Convention on the Law of Sea (UNCLOS). In the EEZ coastal states have exclusive sovereign rights to exploit and extract resources and a responsibility for environmental protection in a zone stretching 200 nautical miles from the state’s coastline which means that the coastal state do not have any other jurisdiction for legal questions in the EEZ. Therefore Finland did not have jurisdiction to retain or board ships that are under investigation since only the ship’s flag state obtains the right.

==== UNCLOS Article 113 ====
Damage or injury of submarine cables is regulated in UNCLOS Article 113. Article 113 in UNCLOS regulates the breaking or injury of a submarine cable or pipeline on the high sea which also includes the EEZ pursuant to Article 58, paragraph 2. The article imposes any flag state and state with jurisdiction over a person to introduce national legislation to make it a criminal offense to break or injure submarine cables or pipelines on the high sea, including acts intended to damage, or acts likely to result in the breaking or injury of submarine cables. However the provision, does not apply to actions breaking or injuring submarine cables by persons acting solely for the purpose of saving their lives or their ships, provided that all precautions were taken to avoid such break or injury. The scope of application of Article 113 establishes that the flag state is responsible for ensuring the existence of national legislation protecting submarine cables and pipelines against breaking or injury and not the coastal states who own and rely on these.

==== Convention for the Protection of Submarine Telegraph Cables from 1884 ====
The convention from 1884 Article X entitled the coastal state to require the suspected vessel to produce official documents evidencing its flag state’s nationality whereupon they can prepare a report on the damage, which is to be adjudicated by the courts of the flag state.

The above describes the scope of legal options available to Finland in connection to the incident. Current legislation does not grant the owners of critical maritime infrastructure broad powers to protect it legally. The Balticconnector incident therefore falls into a legal gray area.

=== Reactions ===
In the time following the incident, the reactions of the countries involved were of grave concern and the matter was to be taken extremely serious. The incident and its comparability with The Nordstream sabotage also lead to many speculations from both outsiders, the countries affected and organisations involved. Most Finnish and Estonian leaders remained cautious when it came to determining a cause of the damage to the pipeline, too early

==== Estonia ====
Three days after the damage, Estonia's president, Alar Karis, demanded answers on how the incident could have taken place, stating, "We know that the cause is not nature, but probably human activity. Who, why and how? Negligence or intent? These questions have yet to be answered." The Estonian prime minister, Kaja Kallas, could later state that she had reason to believe that all three cases of damage in the Baltic Sea were related to each other, which later investigation supports. However, the Prime Minister also added that not rushing to premature conclusions was important, and adding that there currently was no risk to the gas supply for Estonia.

==== Finland ====
On the 10 of October 2023 Finland's National Bureau of Investigation (NBI) launched its criminal investigation and examination of the leak and securing of evidence to determine whether or not aggravated criminal activity was at play. The government suggested that "everything indicates" that the Chinese ship damaged the pipeline on purpose with its Minister of European Affairs Anders Adlercreutz saying it's hard to believe that it was not intentional or done without Beijing's knowledge.

==== The EU and NATO ====
On the 10 october, only few days after the incident, the President for the European Commission Ursula von der Leyen, the President for the European Council Charles Michel and NATO Secretary General Jens Stoltenberg were convened for a meeting with the Prime Ministers of Finland and Estonia to discuss the involvement of European partners and allies in the protection of critical infrastructure in the Baltic Sea. Ursula von der Leyen stated afterwards that the EU wishes to continue cooperation with NATO countries, to strengthen resilience against threats to critical infrastructure.

On the following day, Wednesday the 11 October 2023, NATO’s Secretary General, Jens Stoltenberg, stated before at meeting with Defence ministers of the alliance in Brussels, that "If it is proven to be an attack on NATO critical infrastructure (...) it will be met by a united and determined response from NATO,". At this point in time the investigation was still in its very technical early stage, however the claims of a mechanical external force, were festering.

==== Russia ====
To some of the other parties involved, notably Finland, ‘the usual suspect’ was made out to be Russia. This partly stems from the Russian Hydrographic survey vessel ‘Sibiriakov’, being near the pipelines’ area of impact on three separate occasions. Dmitry Peskov, who has been the Kremlin spokesperson since 2012, described the damage as disturbing but adding that they were not in possession of any technical information or aware if the special services were in possession of such information. When Russian President Vladimir Putin was asked at a press conference five days after the incident about the finnish hypothesis of Russia being a suspect, he replied; “Rubbish”, adding that he was in fact not even familiar with the pipes’ existence prior to the news of the damage, and proclaims that the incident serves as a ‘cover up’ diverting attention from the wests’ involvement in the nord stream terrorist attack.

==== China ====
China had previously said that they would provide full cooperation in the investigation into the incident in accordance to international law. The Chinese owner of the vessel, NewNew Shipping has however declined to make comments to the media. On the 12th of August 2024 China acknowledged that the NewNew Polar Bear vessel was responsible for an accidental damage to the pipeline and cables. Mao Ning, a Chinese Foreign Ministry spokesperson, told at a press briefing that the vessel was sailing in relevant waters at the time of the incident and no abnormalities were detected due to the poor sea conditions.

==== The United Kingdom ====
Later on the same week of the incident, the British Prime Minister, Rishi Sunak, had ‘warnings’ to issue on a meeting with northern European leaders on the island of Gotland. The warning entailed that the UK’s allies should not be tricked into a false sense of security, following Putin's failures in Ukraine since these failures “were only emboldening Russia’s irresponsible behaviour in other parts of Europe" In addition to the Balticconnector pipeline incident, the same week, The UK experienced a Russian maritime patrol aircraft flying too close to their regions’ carrier strike group, resulting in the hangar ship HMS Queen Elisabeth having to launch fast jets from her arctic deck, in order to escort the Russian aircraft. The UK vowed to deepen the cooperation on tackling hybrid threats and protect Critical National Infrastructure with Joint Expeditionary Force (JEF) by deploying 20.000 soldiers to Nothern Europe (16.000 to Estonia and Norway alone) along with eight royal navy ships and 25 fighter jets and an aviation task force.

=== Speculations ===
The incident with the damage of the Balticconnector pipeline can be viewed in the light of the fact that the U.S Helsinki Commission has confirmed 150 instances of Russian hybrid operations against NATO countries in 2022-2024. This has sparked speculation as to whether recent damage to undersea infrastructure in the Baltic Sea is actually sabotage.

A global security expert at the Finland Institute of International Affairs, Eoin Micheal McNamara states that there are suspicions of Russian involvement, stating that: "Plausible deniability is a key tenet for hybrid interference. There are suspicions that use of a Hong Kong-registered vessel was a tactic to gain this plausible deniability” and goes on to say that there are doubts about China's claim of ‘accident’, among the Finnish people. In addition, there has been speculation about the conditions of the sea at the time of the incident. China claims that the accident was in part, a result of the bad weather conditions, but it has been confirmed by several sources, including the Meteorological Institute of Finland, that there were no storms in the Gulf of Finland at the time. An extra cause for speculation was also the NewNew Polar bears refusal to respond to communications, once the investigative agencies had recovered the vessels missing anchor from the seabed.

In the Maritime security discourse, acts with potential relation to ‘hybrid war’ are described as a ‘grey zone’ activity. These activities have the intention of blurring the lines between accidents, criminal activity, terrorism, and state-sponsored interference, to cause harm and deliberately complicate the attribution of responsibility.

=== Aftermath ===
Jens Stoltenberg, NATO General Secretary, stated on 14 November 2023 that the damage to Nord Stream and Balticconnector had highlighted the vulnerability of critical maritime infrastructure. Therefore NATO has stepped up its efforts since the incidents with air and naval patrols and increased its presence in the Baltic Sea and North Seas. This must take place alongside increased cooperation between EU and NATO.

The European Commission decided to provide emergency financial support to Finland amounting to 800.000€ given from the EU’s Internal Security Fund, in order to secure the area surrounding the incident and aiding the investigation.

=== Timeline of the 2023 Balticconnector incident ===
A timeline of the key events surrounding the incident: (The timeline is not exhaustive).

- 8 October 2023: A gas leak is detected in the Balticconnector.
- 9 October 2023: The NewNew Polar Bear is docked in the Russian port St. Petersburg. A photograph shows that the ship had its portside anchor chain hanging out.
- 10 October 2023: The Finnish government states that the damage is caused by “external activity”. Therefore the Finnish Border Guard and Finnish Security Intelligence Service would investigate the leak.
- 11 October 2023: Images of the pipeline shows that the pipeline was damaged on one side and it is therefore suggested that the damage may have been caused by a ship’s anchor. Finland National Bureau is investigating a Chinese ship that was in the vicinity of the pipeline shortly before the incident.
- 22 October 2023: Photos from the Russian port Arkhangelsk shows that NewNew Polar Bear was missing its portside anchor.
- 24 October: the anchor of NewNew Polar Bear is recovered from the seabed.
- 22 April 2024: Repairs were finished on the pipeline and operation resumed
- 12 August 2024: China acknowledges that the NewNew Polar Bear vessel was responsible for the accidental damage to the pipeline and cables.
- (Ongoing) Beginning of 2027: NewNew Polar Bear's chinese captain is to stand trial by the court of Hong Kong.

== See also ==
- 2024 Baltic Sea submarine cable disruptions
- Baltic Sea Underwater Infrastructure Events
- C-Lion1 § Fault in 2024 – a submarine communications cable between Finland and Germany that was damaged a year later
- Energy in Estonia
- Inkoo LNG terminal – LNG terminal in Finland
- Gas Interconnection Poland–Lithuania – Natural gas pipeline
- Klaipėda LNG terminal – LNG terminal in Lithuania
- Nordic Warden
