= Elering =

Company based in Estonia

Elering AS
- Company type: State-owned company
- Industry: Electricity
- Founded: November 1, 1998
- Founder: Eesti Energia
- Headquarters: Tallinn, Estonia
- Area served: Estonia
- Key people: Kalle Kilk (Chairman of the Board)
- Services: Electric power transmission Natural gas transmission
- Revenue: €129.23 million (2014)
- Net income: €40.73 million (2014)
- Owner: Government of Estonia
- Website: www.elering.ee

Elering AS (former name: OÜ Põhivõrk) is a national transmission system operator for electricity and natural gas with headquarters in Tallinn, Estonia. The managing director of Elering is Taavi Veskimägi.

== History ==
Elering was established on 1 November 1998 under the name of Põhivõrk as an operating unit of the Estonian national power company Eesti Energia. On 1 April 2004, it became a private limited company, OÜ Põhivõrk, as a subsidiary of Eesti Energia. On 10 June 2009, the company changed its name to Elering. To implement the EU 3rd energy package, the Government of Estonia decided on 28 August 2009 to go for an ownership unbundling and to buy out Elering from Eesti Energia. The transaction was concluded on 28 January 2010. On 2 February 2010, Elering signed an agreement with Nord Pool Spot to create the Nord Pool Spot Estlink price area, starting from 1 April 2010. On 25 February 2011, Elering was transformed to a public limited company, AS Elering.

In November 2014, Elering entered the natural gas transmission market by acquiring a majority stake in the holding company AS Võrguteenus Valdus, an owner of EG Võrguteenus (later renamed: Elering Gaas). EG Võrguteenus was established in 2005 as a subsidiary of Eesti Gaas. Originally it operated both—a transmission network and a distribution network—but in 2013 the distribution network was separated from the company. In November 2013, to implement the EU 3rd energy package EG Võrguteenus was separated from Eesti Gaas. In June 2015, Elering acquired the stake which was owned by Gazprom, and in September 2015, Elering acquired the stake which was owned by Itera Latvija in AS Võrguteenus Valdus shares. In December 2015, after acquiring shares owned by minority shareholders of AS Võrguteenus Valdus Elering decided to merge Elering Gas and Võrguteenus Valdus into Elering.

On 24 May 2019, Elering along with Latvian and Lithuanian transmission system operators Augstsprieguma tīkls and Litgrid signed an agreement to join the synchronous electricity grid of Continental Europe.

In 2020, the company will pay dividends of 25.6 million euros.

== Electricity market ==
Elering is an operator of the Estonian electricity transmission grid, which is synchronized with BRELL, a part of the unified electricity system of Russia. Together with Latvian and Lithuanian transmission system operators Augstsprieguma tīkls and Litgrid, Elering is planning to move the Baltic electricity grid from BRELL to the synchronous electricity grid of Continental Europe by 2025.

Together with the transmission system operator of Finland, Fingrid, Elering is preparing the construction of the Estlink-2 cable between Estonia and Finland. Elering also operates interconnections between Estonia and Latvia, Estlink interconnections between Estonia and Finland.

Elering is a member of the European Network of Transmission System Operators for Electricity.

== Natural gas market ==
Elering is the natural gas transmission system operator of Estonia. Together with Finnish state-owned company Baltic Connector OY, Elering is developing the undersea gas pipeline Balticconnector between Estonia and Finland.

== See also ==
- Energy in Estonia
- Bog Fox
