= RV Mirai =

Research ship built in 1969

- Mirai on 5 October 2025

History

Japan
- Name: Mutsu
- Namesake: Mutsu, Aomori
- Ordered: 17 November 1967
- Builder: Ishikawajima-Harima Heavy Industries, Tokyo, Japan
- Yard number: 2107
- Laid down: 27 November 1968
- Launched: 12 June 1969
- Completed: 4 September 1972 (fuel loaded)
- Decommissioned: 1992
- Fate: Rebuilt as the research vessel Mirai

Japan
- Name: Mirai
- Namesake: Japanese for "future"
- Owner: Japan Agency for Marine-Earth Science and Technology
- Builder: Mitsubishi Heavy Industries, Shimonoseki, Japan (new stern section)
- Completed: 1 October 1997
- Identification: IMO number: 6919423; MMSI number: 431939000; Call sign: JNSR
- Status: In service

General characteristics (as Mutsu)
- Type: General cargo ship
- Length: 130 m (427 ft)
- Beam: 19 m (62 ft)
- Draught: 6.9 m (23 ft)
- Depth: 13.2 m (43 ft)
- Installed power: 36-megawatt Mitsubishi PWR (LEU <= 4.44%)
- Propulsion: Steam turbine, 10,000 shp
- Speed: 17 knots (31 km/h; 20 mph)
- Crew: 80

General characteristics (as Mirai)
- Type: Research vessel
- Tonnage: 8,706 GT; 3,419 NT
- Length: 128.5 m (422 ft)
- Beam: 19 m (62 ft)
- Draught: 6.9 m (23 ft)
- Depth: 10.5 m (34 ft)
- Ice class: 1A
- Installed power: 4 × Daihatsu 6DKM-28 (4 × 1,838 kW)
- Propulsion: Diesel-electric, two shafts; Controllable pitch propellers
- Speed: 18.3 knots (33.9 km/h; 21.1 mph) (maximum); 16 knots (30 km/h; 18 mph) (service)
- Range: 12,000 nautical miles (22,000 km; 14,000 mi)
- Crew: 34 crew; 46 research personnel

RV Mirai is a Japanese oceanographic research vessel. She was originally built as the nuclear-powered general cargo ship Mutsu, but never carried commercial cargo.

== History ==
=== Mutsu (1972–1996) ===
The reactor was completed on 25 August 1972, and fuel was loaded on 4 September. When officials announced that the first test run was to be run at the pier in Ōminato, local protests forced them to reconsider. Eventually it was decided to test the ship in the open ocean, 800 kilometres (430 nmi) east of Cape Shiriya. The ship departed Ōminato on 26 August 1974, and the reactor attained criticality on 28 August.

==== Radiation accident ====
As the crew brought the reactor up to 1.4% of capacity at 5pm on 1 September 1974, there was a minor shielding inadequacy that permitted the escape of neutrons and gamma rays from the reactor shielding enclosure. Westinghouse Electric Corporation had reviewed the design and warned of this possibility, but no changes were made to the design. There was no significant radiation exposure, but it became a political issue, with local fishermen blocking her return to port for more than 50 days. The government finally came to an agreement with the local government and fishermen; the Mutsu was allowed back to port on condition that it was to find a new home port, and the ship returned to Ōminato on 15 October.

In Sasebo, between 1978 and 1982, various modifications were made to the reactor shield of the Mutsu, and its home port was moved to Sekinehama in 1983. Following an overhaul, the Mutsu was completed in February 1991. She then completed her original design objective of travelling 82,000 kilometres (51,000 mi) in testing, and was decommissioned in 1992. Over 25 years the programme had cost more than 120 billion yen (about US$1.2 billion).

=== Mirai (1996–present) ===
After removing the reactor in 1995 and decontaminating the vessel, Mutsu was rebuilt as the ocean observation vessel Mirai. The Mirai was decommissioned in December 2025 and will be replaced by the Mirai II as of December 2026.

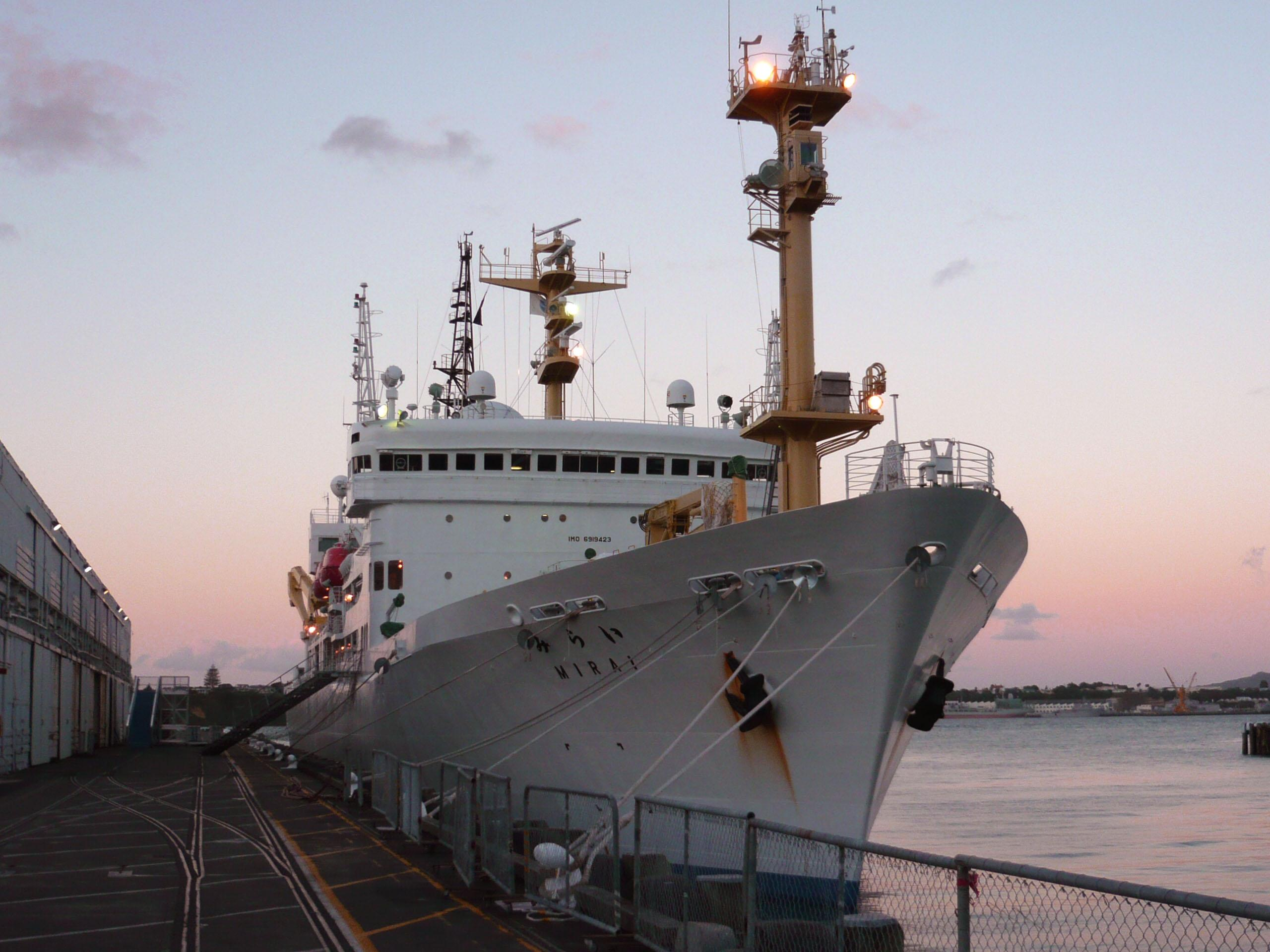
RV Mirai on 27 December 2007

== Mutsu Science Museum ==
The reactor room, control room, bridge, bow, and propeller were converted into a museum and are open to the public at the Mutsu Science Museum. Visitors can interact with the controls in the control room and view the reactor vessel through several viewing ports.

The nuclear material from the ship is stored across the street from the museum at a facility operated by the Japan Atomic Energy Agency.

== See also ==
- Savannah, the world's first nuclear-powered cargo ship
- Otto Hahn, a German nuclear-powered cargo ship
- Sevmorput, a Soviet and later Russian nuclear-powered cargo ship
