= Bog Fox =

Transmission tower in Estonia

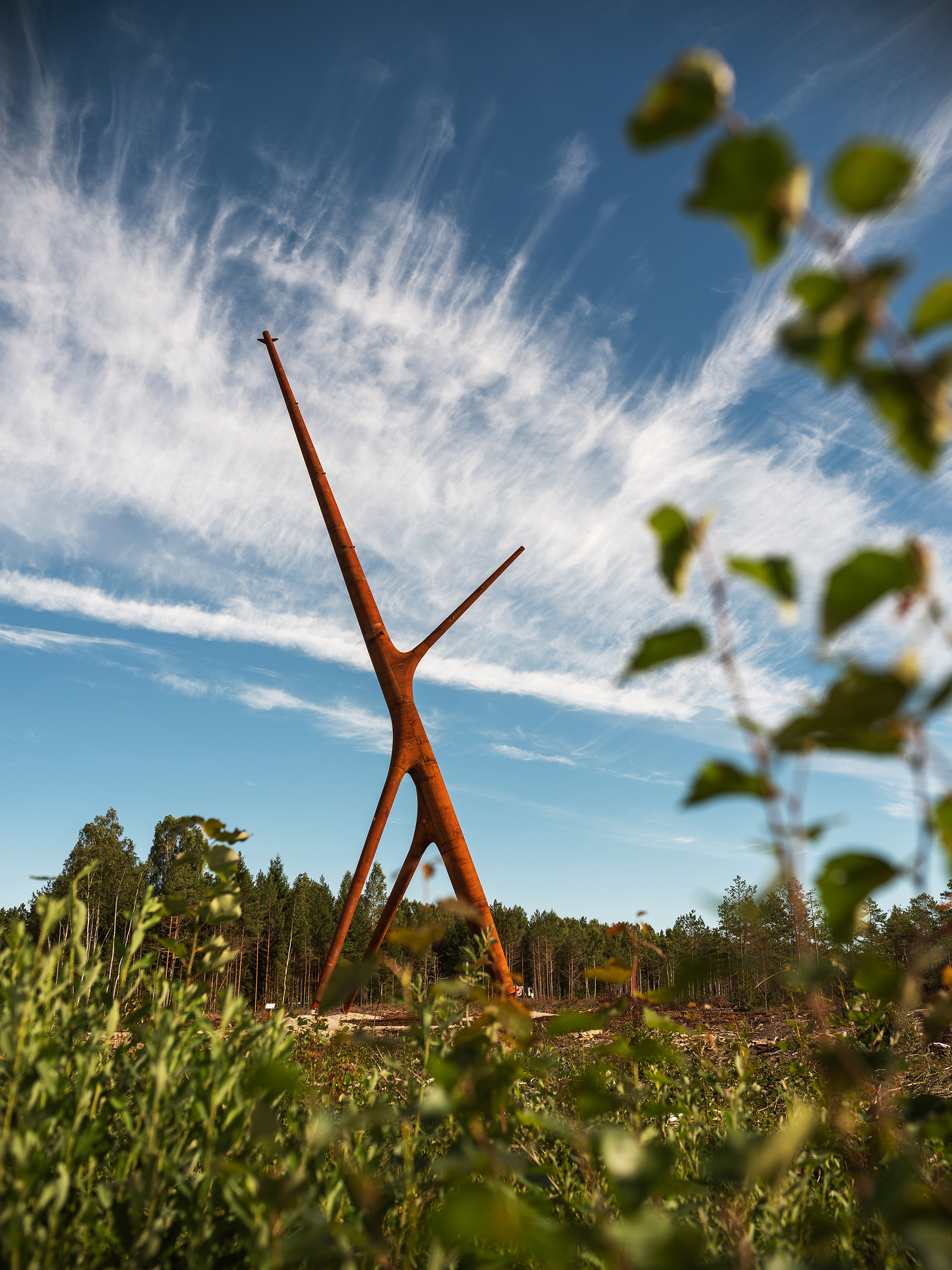
This designer high-voltage pylon is located in Risti, Lääne County. Photo: Tõnu Tunnel

Designer high-voltage pylon Bog Fox (Estonian: Soorebane) is Estonia’s first high-voltage designer pylon, established as the corner pylon of the Harku–Lihula–Sindi high-voltage line in summer 2020. The pylon is located in Risti, Lääne County, Estonia.

Estonia's first designer high-voltage pylon was created by Part OÜ architects Sille Pihlak and Siim Tuksam.

Bog Fox is 45 metres high at its highest point, weighs 38 tonnes and should last for at least 50 years. The designer pylon is made of COR-TEN steel, which gives the pylon its characteristic rusty hue. The pylon's trunk is 1.66 metres at its thickest point and the wall's maximum thickness is 22 mm.

Bog Fox was made in a factory in Romania and brought to Estonia on three lorries in 11 parts.

== Design competition ==
In March 2016, Estonian electric utility company Elering, in cooperation with the Union for Estonian Architects, organised the design competition to find a suitable design to build a corner pylon for the Harku–Lihula–Sindi 330/110 kilovolt high-voltage line in Kuistlema Bog between the Ääsmäe–Haapsalu and Risti–Virtsu highways. The goal of the competition was to find the most suitably architectural and functional solution that would facilitate the line's adaptation to the surrounding nature and raise awareness of the electrical system's role in today's society. Estonia's first design competition of this type received 18 works. In addition to submissions from Estonia, the competition also received works from architects in Austria, Denmark and the United Kingdom. The winner of the competition was the solution named Bog Fox by Part OÜ architects Sille Pihlak and Siim Tuksam.

== Construction and set-up ==
The details of the pylon were manufactured 2000 km away in Romania, from where they were transported to Estonia at the beginning of July 2020 in 11 parts on three lorries. The workers at the pylon's manufacturing plant welded the main details together in a rest area on the Risti-Virtsu highway just a few kilometres from its final location. The pylon was set up on 21 July 2020. Bog Fox carries Elering's Harku-Lihula-Sindi 330/110 kilovolt high-voltage line. The line was finished in December of the same year. Companies Empower and Leonhard Weiss were the main employers of the construction of both the line and the designer pylon.

The pylon's foundation is also remarkable. As the ground is wetland, the designer pylon's foundation is anchored to the ground with 25 pegs. Each peg is 19 metres high and therefore their total height is almost 500 metres.

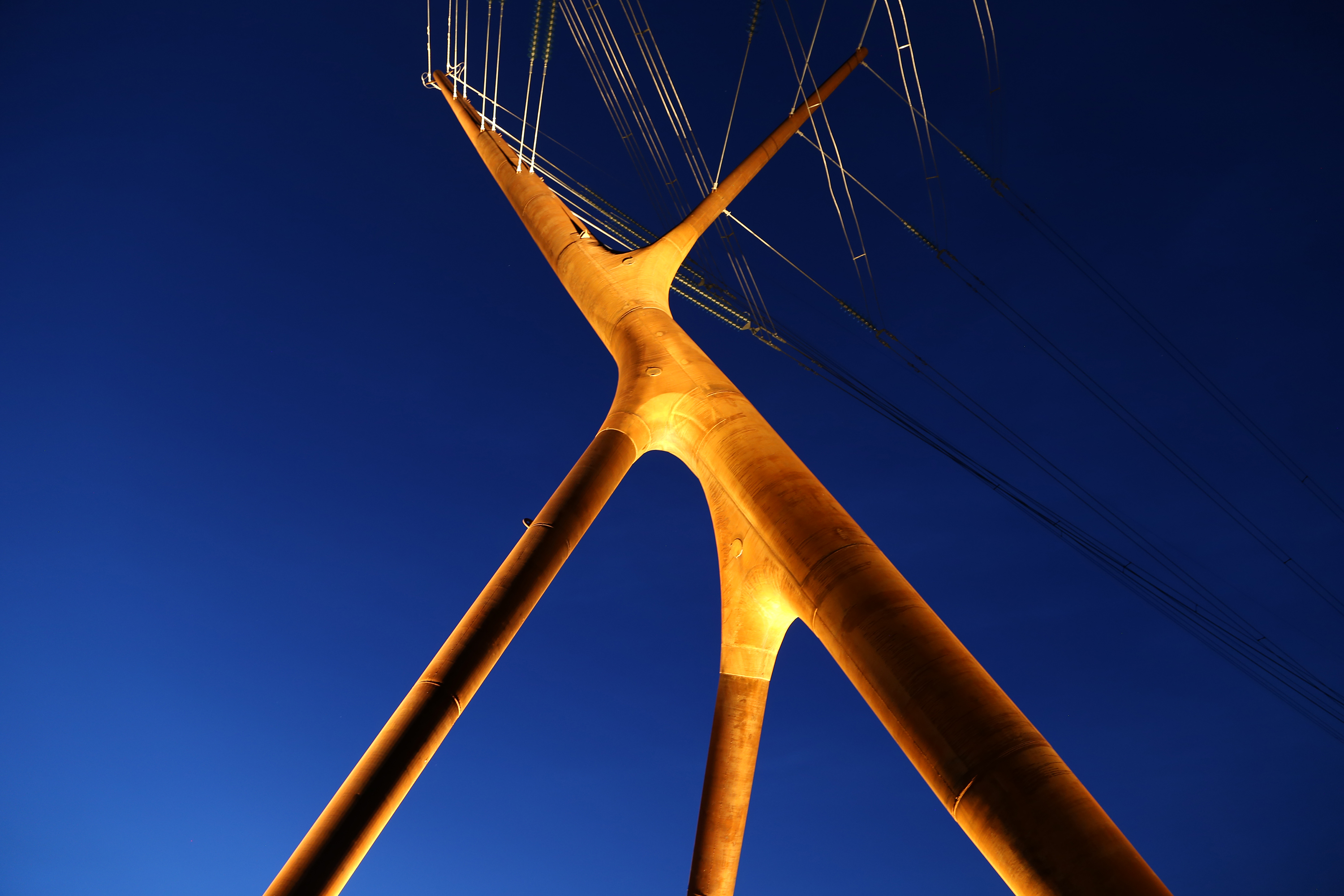
Bog Fox lit up on a night in May. Photo: Ain Köster

Since May 2021, Bog Fox has been lit up during the night.

== Recognition ==
The design competition organised to find a solution for the designer pylon received the title of best procurement in 2016 at the Estonian Design Awards 2016. Bog Fox received two awards in the competition for construction project of the year organised in 2020 by the Estonian Association of Architectural and Consulting Engineering Companies. Bog Fox also received first place in the competition for digital innovation project of the year and construction project of the year in the buildings category.

The designer pylon received its most prestigious award in a competition in the same year – Annual Awards 2020 of the Union of Estonian Architects – where it was chosen as the winner of the annual award in the category ‘Small’ with the work ‘Shed in Taga-Sõrve’.
