= Gasum =

Nordic gas and energy company

Gasum Oy
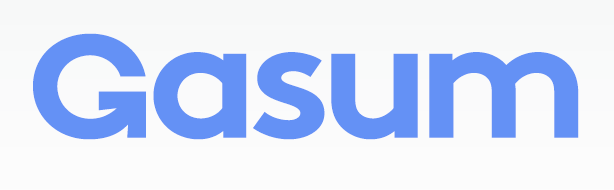
- Type: Limited company (Oy)
- Industry: Oil and gas
- Founded: 1994
- Headquarters: Espoo, Finland
- Area served: Finland, Sweden, Norway, Denmark, Germany, France, Germany, Europe, ARA region, Singapore
- Key people: Mika Wiljanen (CEO); Sirpa-Helena Sormunen (Chairman of the Board)
- Products: Biogas; Natural gas LNG; Organic fertilizers Wind power
- Services: Energy market services Bunkering services Processing of biodegradable waste Circular economy solutions
- Revenue: €1,571 million (2021)
- Net income: €-84.4 million (2021)
- Owner: Gasonia Oy (state-owned holding company, 73.5%); Finnish Government (26.5%)
- Number of employees: 330 (2021)
- Divisions: Maritime, traffic, industry
- Subsidiaries: Gasum AB
- Website: www.gasum.com

Gasum Oy is a Finnish state-owned energy company operating in the Nordics. Gasum owns 18 biogas refineries in Finland, Sweden and Denmark, and is the largest processor of biodegradable waste in the Nordic countries. In addition, Gasum sells wind power and provides various energy market services. It is in the process of building a gas filling station network that will also serve heavy-duty vehicles.

== History ==
The first natural gas pipeline from the Soviet Union to Finland was opened in 1974. From 1974 to 1994, Neste Oy was responsible for the import, transmission services, and wholesale of natural gas in Finland. Gasum was established in 1994 as a joint venture between Neste (75%) and Gazprom (25%).

After the merger of Neste and Imatran Voima in 1998, the newly created company Fortum had to reduce its stake in Gasum to 25%. As a result, the government of Finland (24%), E.ON (20%) and Finnish forest companies (6%) became new shareholders. In 2004, Fortum acquired the 6% stake from the forest companies. In 2015, Fortum and E.ON sold their stake to the Finnish government. In 2016, Gazprom sold its stake to the Finnish government which became the sole shareholder of the company.

In 2014, Gasum acquired 51% of Skangas from Lyse Energi and increased its ownership to 100% in 2018. Skangas started their LNG business in 2011. In 2018, Gasum built Finland's first liquefied natural gas (LNG) terminal at the oil and chemical harbor of the port of Tahkoluoto in Pori.

Gasum expanded into the Swedish market in 2016 by acquiring Swedish Biogas International. After the deal, Gasum became the largest biogas producer in the Nordic countries. In April 2020, Gasum acquired Linde AG's LNG and biogas business in Sweden and Norway and Nauticor's marine bunkering business in Germany. The LNG terminals in Nynäshamn in Sweden and the bunkering vessels Seagas and Kairos, were transferred to Gasum.

Gasum planned to build a subsea gas pipeline Balticconnector to connect Finland with the Estonian gas system and further with a gas storage in Latvia. In October 2015, Gasum abandoned the project due to commercial viability. It was replaced in the project by the Finnish state-owned company Baltic Connector Oy.

Before 2020, Gasum owned 1,190 km (740 mi) of gas transmission network in Finland. According to the Natural Gas Market Act of Finland, gas transmission operations were unbundled to another state-owned company Gasgrid Finland Oy, as of 1 January 2020. Starting from 1 January 2020, its subsidiary, Kaasupörssi Oy, which operated Finland's gas exchange, was closed and all trading moved to the regional GET Baltic exchange.

In 2020, the company entered into partnership with Pavilion Energy, Singapore.

== Operations ==
=== Biogas and natural gas ===
Gasum imports and sells natural gas, including liquefied natural gas (LNG). In 2011, Gasum started biogas production by using anaerobic digestion. Gasum owns biogas plants in Finland, Sweden and Denmark. The company produces fertilizer products and nutrients along with biogas.

Gasum offers LBG and LNG bunkering service in terminals located in Norway (Risavika, Øra), Sweden (Lysekil and Nynäshamn) and Finland (Pori and Tornio). In addition to the Nordic countries, it provides bunkering services in the Antwerp, Rotterdam and Amsterdam region, in Germany, and in partnership with Pavilion Energy in Singapore. Despite the ongoing war in Ukraine, Gasom decided to continue purchasing gas from Russia.

=== Filling stations ===
Gasum has around 100 gas filling stations in the Nordic countries.

=== Energy market services ===
Gasum offers energy market expert services. It is also a member of the Nordic power exchange of Nasdaq OMX.

== Corporate details ==
=== Management ===
Since 2022, the chief executive officer is Mika Viljanen and the chair of the board is Sirpa-Helena Sormunen since 2024.

=== Affiliations ===
Gasum is involved in several international organizations, such as Eurogas, European Network of Transmission System Operators for Gas (ENTSOG), Gas Infrastructure Europe (GIE), International Gas Union (IGU), European Gas Research Group (GERG) and the European Pipeline Research Group (EPRG).

== Gallery ==
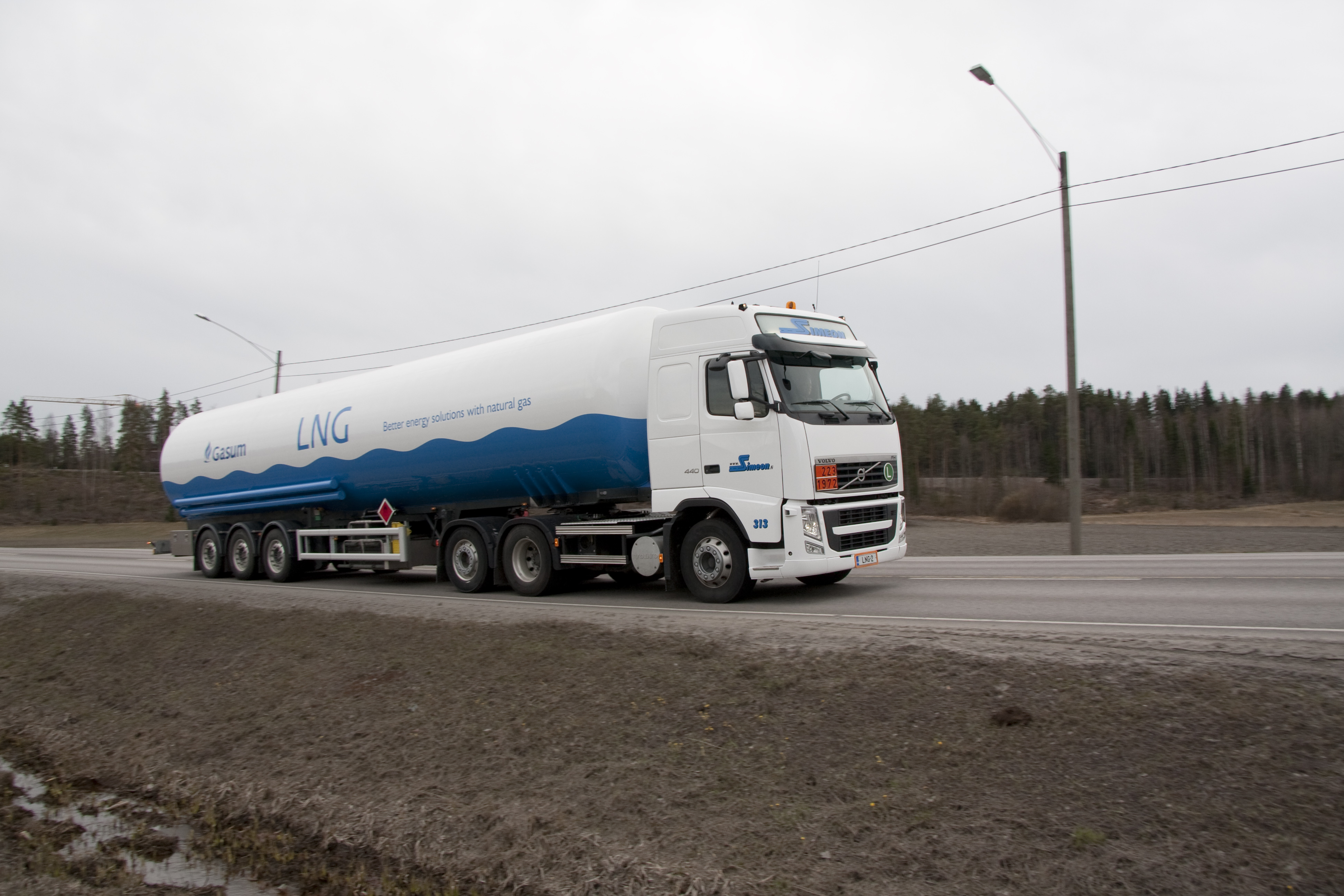
Gasum can deliver LNG and LBG by truck to maritime vessels, industry or gas filling station.

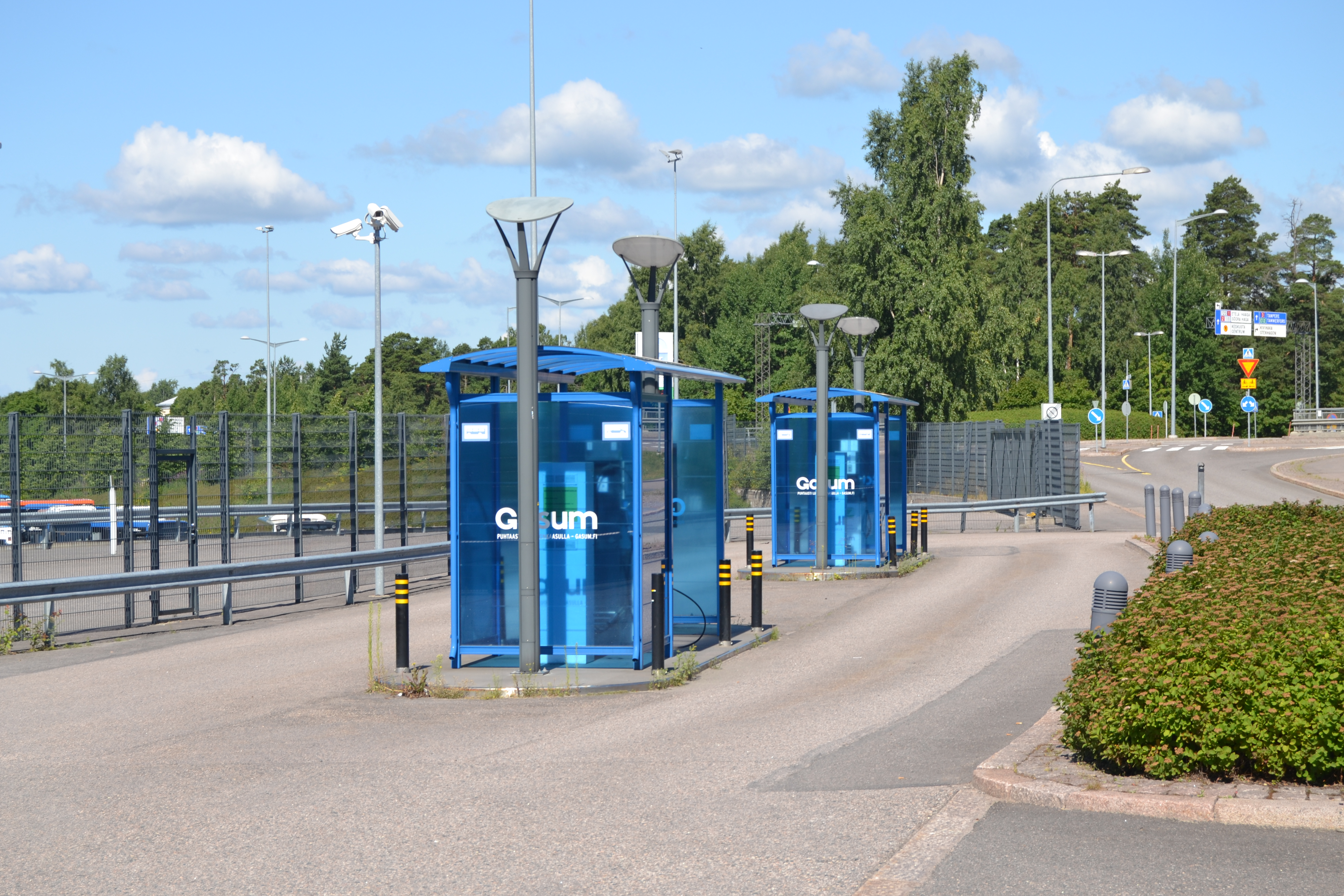
Gas filling station in Ruskeasuo, Helsinki.

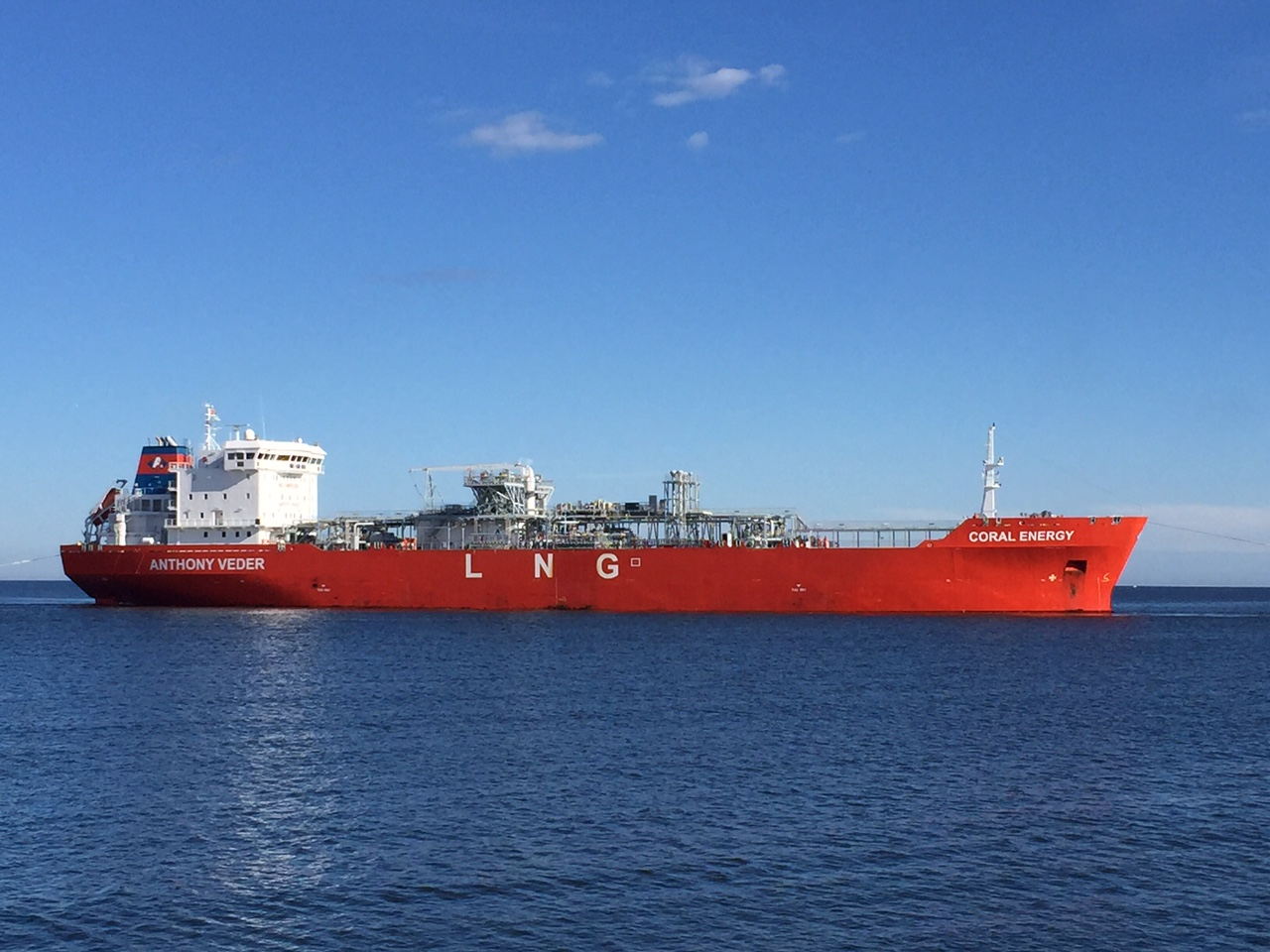
Gasum delivers LNG with carriers to terminals located in Finland, Sweden and Norway.

== See also ==
- Energy in Finland
