= Sevmorput =

Nuclear powered cargo ship

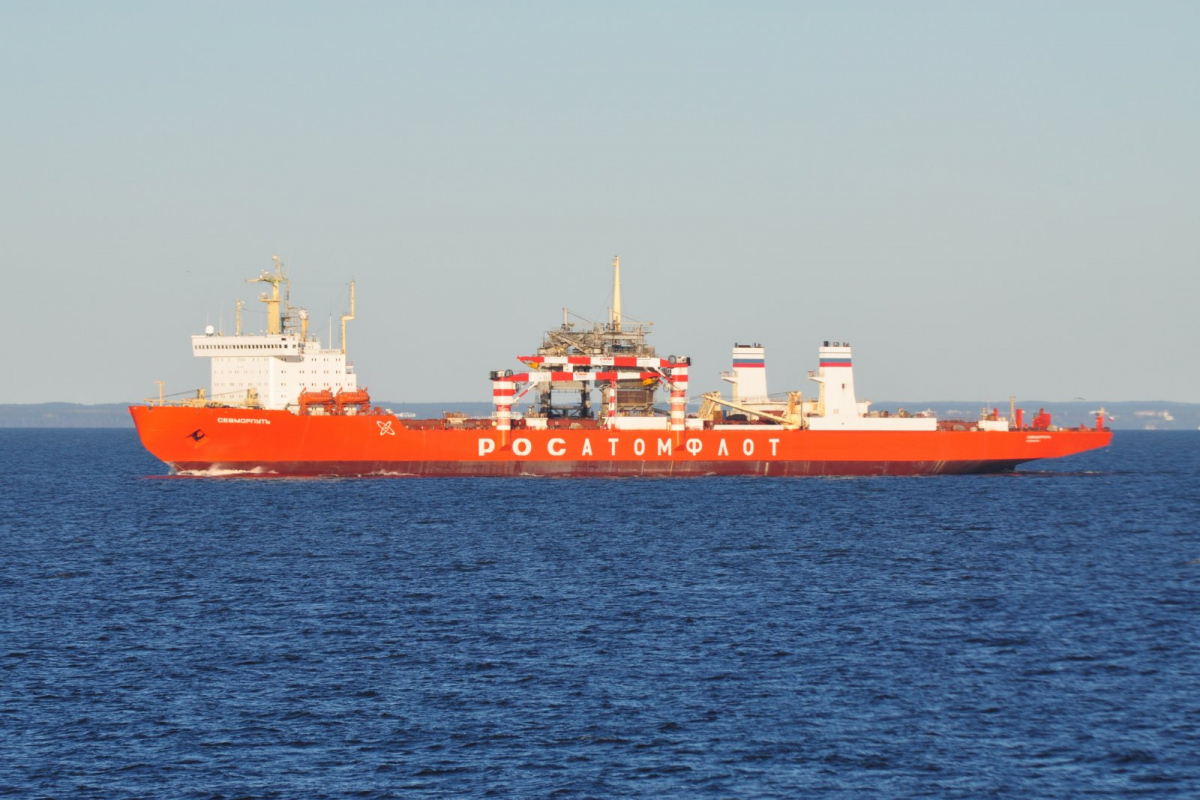
- Sevmorput in the Baltic Sea in February 2020

History

Russia
- Name: Sevmorput (Севморпуть)
- Namesake: Northern Sea Route
- Owner: Russian Federation
- Operator: Murmansk Shipping Company (1988–2008); Atomflot (Rosatom) (2008–present)
- Port of registry: Murmansk
- Ordered: 30 May 1978
- Builder: Zaliv Shipyard (Kerch, Ukrainian SSR)
- Cost: US$265 million
- Yard number: 401
- Laid down: 1 June 1982
- Launched: 20 February 1986
- Completed: 31 December 1988
- In service: 1988–2007; 2016–2023
- Out of service: 2007–2016
- Identification: Call sign: UHBY; IMO number: 8729810; MMSI number: 273137100
- Status: Laid up

General characteristics
- Type: LASH carrier/container ship
- Tonnage: 38,226 GT; 11,468 NT; 33,980 DWT (summer); 26,480 DWT (Arctic)
- Displacement: 61,880 tons (summer)
- Length: 260.30 m (854.0 ft)
- Beam: 32.20 m (105.6 ft)
- Draught: 11.80 m (38.7 ft) (summer); 10.65 m (34.9 ft) (Arctic)
- Depth: 18.30 m (60.0 ft)
- Ice class: RMRS ULA (1981 rules); RMRS UL (current)
- Installed power: KLT-40 nuclear reactor (135 MWt)
- Propulsion: Single shaft; steam turbine (29,420 kW); 4-bladed ducted controllable-pitch propeller
- Speed: 20.8 knots (38.5 km/h; 23.9 mph) (10 m (33 ft) draught, full power); 2 knots (3.7 km/h; 2.3 mph) in 1 m (3.3 ft) level ice
- Range: Unlimited (nuclear); 6,000 nautical miles (11,000 km; 6,900 mi) (diesel)
- Capacity: 74 lighters (300 tons each); 1,328 TEU

Sevmorput (Russian: Севморпуть, IPA: [sʲɪvmɐrˈputʲ], lit. Northern Sea Route) is a Russian nuclear-powered cargo ship. The 1988-built vessel is one of only four nuclear-powered merchant ships ever built and, after returning to service in 2016 following an extensive refit, the only such vessel to remain in service until the 2020s.

== History ==
=== Development and construction ===
After the Second World War, the Soviet Union began developing the Northern Sea Route in order to support the economic exploitation of the vast natural resources of the northern regions. The ambitious plan initiated by the 20th Congress of the Communist Party of the Soviet Union in the 1950s led to the construction of powerful icebreakers to escort cargo ships through the ice-covered waters and extend the navigating season in the Russian Arctic. The flagship of the post-war Soviet icebreaker fleet was the world's first nuclear-powered icebreaker, Lenin.

While numerous warships and submarines were built with nuclear marine propulsion, attempts to utilize the nearly unlimited range provided by an onboard nuclear reactor to transport commercial cargo were limited to a small number of experimental prototypes. The United States had built the world's first nuclear-powered merchant ship, Savannah, primarily as a technological demonstrator and ambassador for the peaceful use of atomic power rather than an economically viable cargo ship. Similarly, both the West German Otto Hahn and the Japanese Mutsu were intended to be research ships and to provide experience from nuclear propulsion; the latter also never carried any commercial cargo.

However, the Soviet Union continued developing nuclear-powered ships to support Arctic shipping and began building new nuclear-powered icebreakers in the 1970s. On 30 May 1978, the Ministry of the Merchant Marine (MORFLOT) and the Ministry of Shipbuilding Industry of the Soviet Union signed a joint decision No. C-13/01360 for the development of an ice-strengthened nuclear-powered lighter aboard ship (LASH) carrier. The design work was assigned to the Leningrad-based Central Design Bureau "Baltsudoproekt".

The keel of "Project 10081" was laid at Zaliv Shipyard in Kerch, Ukrainian Soviet Socialist Republic, on 1 June 1982 and the ship was launched on 20 February 1986. The nuclear-powered LASH carrier was named Sevmorput (Russian: Севморпуть, IPA: [sʲɪvmɐrˈputʲ]) after the Russian abbreviation for the Northern Sea Route (Russian: Се́верный морско́й путь, romanized: Severnyy morskoy put). The ship's KLT-40 reactor plant reached criticality on 26 October 1986. Sevmorput was delivered to the state-owned Murmansk Shipping Company (MSCO) on 31 December 1988.

The overall price of the nuclear-powered cargo ship was reported to be around US$265 million.

=== Career ===
==== Murmansk Shipping Company (1988–2008) ====
After leaving the shipyard and entering commercial service, Sevmorput sailed through the Mediterranean and around Africa until finally reaching the Soviet Far East. However, authorities in Nakhodka, Vostochny, Magadan and Vladivostok refused to accept the two-month-old ship into their ports due to popular protests. In addition the harbour workers also refused to load or unload any cargo or provide any port services due to fears of radiation leakage. This was caused by uncertainty about the safety of the ship's nuclear propulsion system and the shadow of the Chernobyl disaster only a few years earlier. The local newspapers had also reported a four-minute emergency on board the nuclear icebreaker Rossiya only a week before the arrival of Sevmorput. The ship was finally allowed to dock at Vladivostok on 13 March 1989.

The initial plan was to utilize Sevmorput in international transport, and the Soviet government applied for a permission to have the ship make several stops in Vancouver, British Columbia, Canada, in March 1990. However, the permission was denied because the evacuation and emergency response measures of the city were not deemed adequate in case of an accident involving the ship's nuclear reactor. Later the ship was mainly used on the Murmansk-Dudinka route, but also made several trips to Vietnam in the early 1990s. The daily operating expenses of Sevmorput were reportedly around US$90,000 and she was not expected to make profit during the first two years of her career.

In the late 1990s, Sevmorput was laid up in Murmansk due to delays in the refueling of her reactor. The refueling finally took place in 2001 and later the ship resumed service on the Dudinka route.

In August 2007, it was reported that Sevmorput would be converted into the world's first nuclear-powered drillship due to lack of demand for cargo operators for lighters and the need of specialized drilling vessels in the Russian Arctic. The conversion at the Zvezdochka plant in Severodvinsk was to take only 18 months. However, the renovation project was cancelled in February 2008.

==== Atomflot (2008–present) ====
The management of the Russian nuclear-powered icebreaker fleet was transferred from MSCO to Rosatom in 2008. In October 2009, the general director of Atomflot announced that Sevmorput could remain in service for 15 years.

In late October 2012, it was reported that Sevmorput, which had been lying idle at the Atomflot base outside Murmansk since 2007, had been removed from the Russian Ship Register in July and would be sold for scrap. However, in December 2013 it was reported that the decision to decommission the nuclear-powered ship had been cancelled and that the vessel would be brought back to service by February 2016. Following a two-year refit and refueling of the reactor, Sevmorput left Murmansk in November 2015 for the first time in nine years to carry out sea trials in the Barents Sea.

Since returning to service in 2016, the world's only nuclear-powered cargo ship has been chartered mainly by the Russian Ministry of Defence for transporting cargo related to the development of military infrastructure in the Arctic. In addition, the vessel has occasionally transported supplies for oil and gas projects.

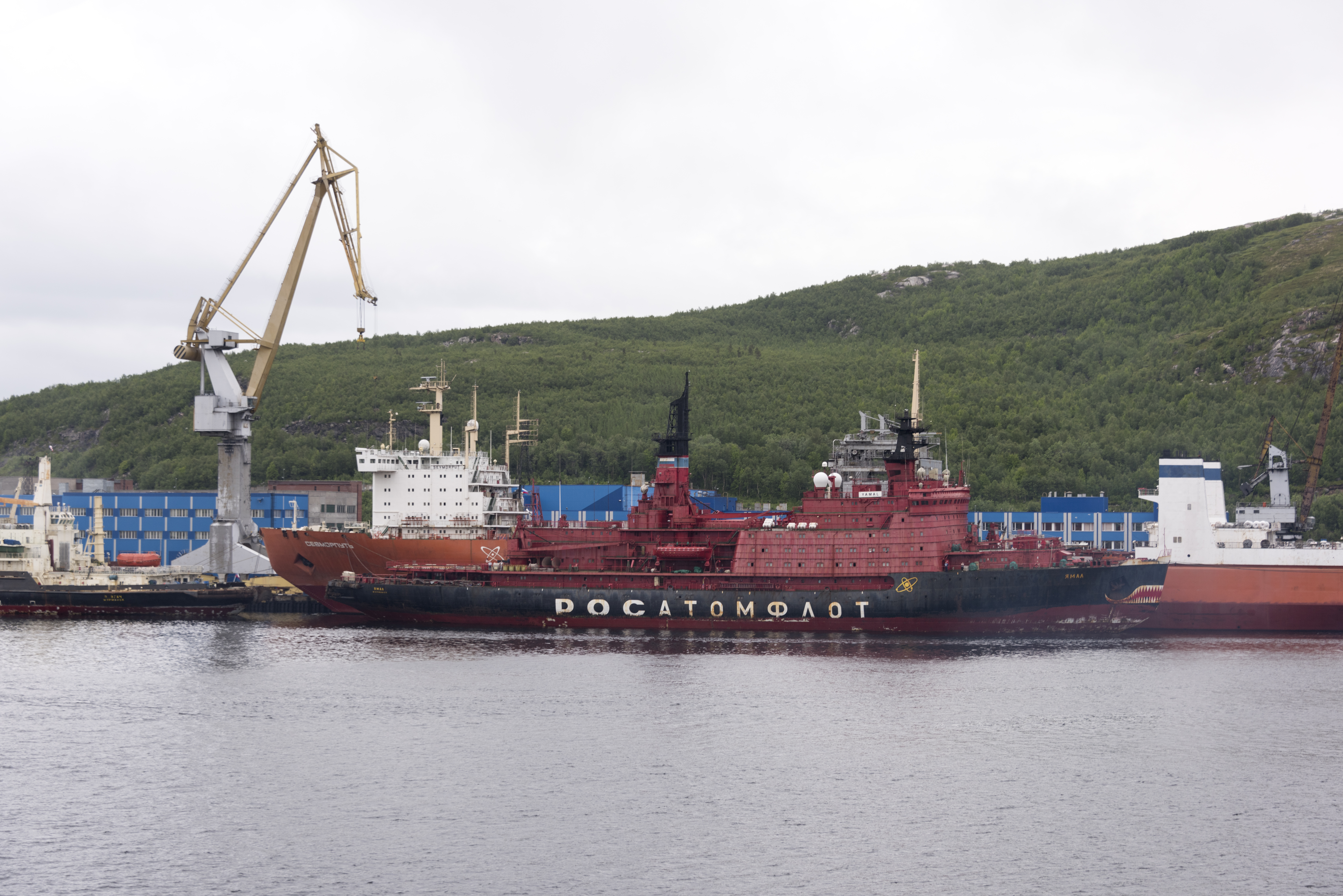
Sevmorput behind the nuclear-powered icebreaker Yamal at Atomflot's base in Murmansk

In October 2018, the Russian Federal Agency for Fishery (Rosrybolovstvo), Rosatom and various Russian fishing industry organizations began discussing the possibility of transporting Pacific salmon caught in Kamchatka to western Russia along the Northern Sea Route using Sevmorput. Initially, two test shipments of 5,000 tonnes of frozen fish from Petropavlovsk-Kamchatsky to Saint Petersburg were planned for 2019, but the second voyage was later cancelled after the first voyage turned out to be less profitable than expected. On 21 March 2019, Sevmporput sailed for the first time from Arkhangelsk to Utrenneye (Salmanovskoye) natural gas field at Gyda Peninsula to transport 17,000 tons of construction goods for Novatek's Arctic LNG 2 project. The passage took in total of five days. The ship completed the same journey also the next year in March 2020, delivering 20,000 tons of goods.

While Russian nuclear-powered icebreakers had occasionally operated in the Gulf of Finland, Sevmorput's pilot voyage in September 2019 marked the first time commercial cargo was carried to the Baltic Sea on board a Russian nuclear-powered vessel. While the vessel later returned to Murmansk, the sinking of the only Russian floating dock capable of accommodating the vessel in November 2018 forced Sevmorput to sail back to Saint Petersburg for propeller repairs in December 2019.

After transporting a second shipment of fish from Petropavlovsk-Kamchatsky to Saint Petersburg in September 2020, reportedly on the orders of President Vladimir Putin, Sevmorput loaded prefabricated building modules for the new Vostok Station in Antarctica and departed on 5 October. This would mark the first time a nuclear-powered surface ship would sail to the Earth's southernmost continent. After leaving the Baltic Sea and passing through the English Channel, Sevmorput headed south along the European and African coasts. However, shortly after crossing the Equator the vessel unexpectedly slowed down from its usual transit speed of about 18 knots (33 km/h; 21 mph) to about 6 to 7 knots (11 to 13 km/h; 6.9 to 8.1 mph) and, after sailing back and forth along its past track for a while, changed course towards Africa. Although Rosatomflot initially declined to comment the situation, unofficial reports implied that Sevmorput lost one of its four propeller blades and divers had to remove the opposite blade to balance the propeller. On 26 November, it was confirmed that Sevmorput would have to head back to Saint Petersburg for repairs and the construction of the new Vostok station would be postponed to 2021 due to deteriorating ice conditions in Antarctica. After a winter lay-up, the vessel was drydocked in April 2021 and the repairs were completed in July. Although metal fatigue, foreign object and improper operation were all considered potential explanations, the root cause of the propeller blade failure could not be determined.

In August 2021, Sevmorput sailed to Murmansk. After spending two months at quayside, the ship returned again to Saint Petersburg to load nuclear power plant components for Rooppur Nuclear Power Plant under construction in Bangladesh. The cargo would be shipped to Vladivostok for transshipment to conventionally-powered cargo ship. In October 2021, BSK-Rybnaya Kompaniya chartered the nuclear-powered cargo ship to transport frozen fish from Kamchatka with the first voyage along the Northern Sea Route scheduled for November 2021.

In August 2022, Sevmorput shuttled cargo from Murmansk to Rogachevo air base and Pan'kovo test range on Novaya Zemlya in presumed preparation for testing of the nuclear-powered missile 9M730 Burevestnik. In addition, the vessel made two subsidized cargo voyages to the Far East along the Northern Sea Route.

In 2023, Sevmorput made two round trips from Saint Petersburg to the Far East carrying commercial cargo. In October 2023, Sevmorput was one of the ships suspected by Finnish police of possible involvement in damage to the Balticconnector natural gas pipeline and telecommunication cables that occurred in the Gulf of Finland on 8 October. However, the anchor retrieved from the seabed next to the damaged pipeline was later identified as having come from the Chinese container ship Newnew Polar Bear that sailed alongside Sevmorput at the time of the incident.

In December 2023, Atomflot stated that Sevmorput could remain in service until 2024 after which it would be replaced by a conventionally-fueled vessel. On 24 December 2023, a fire broke out onboard Sevmorput while the vessel was moored at Atomflot's base in Murmansk. The fire was reportedly contained in one of the vessel's cabins and affected an area of about 30 square metres (320 sq ft), was promptly extinguished, and caused no injuries.

Although three subsidized cargo voyages along the Northern Sea Route were planned for 2024, Sevmorput was not taken into use and as of 2025 remains laid up at Atomflot's base in Murmansk.

== Design ==
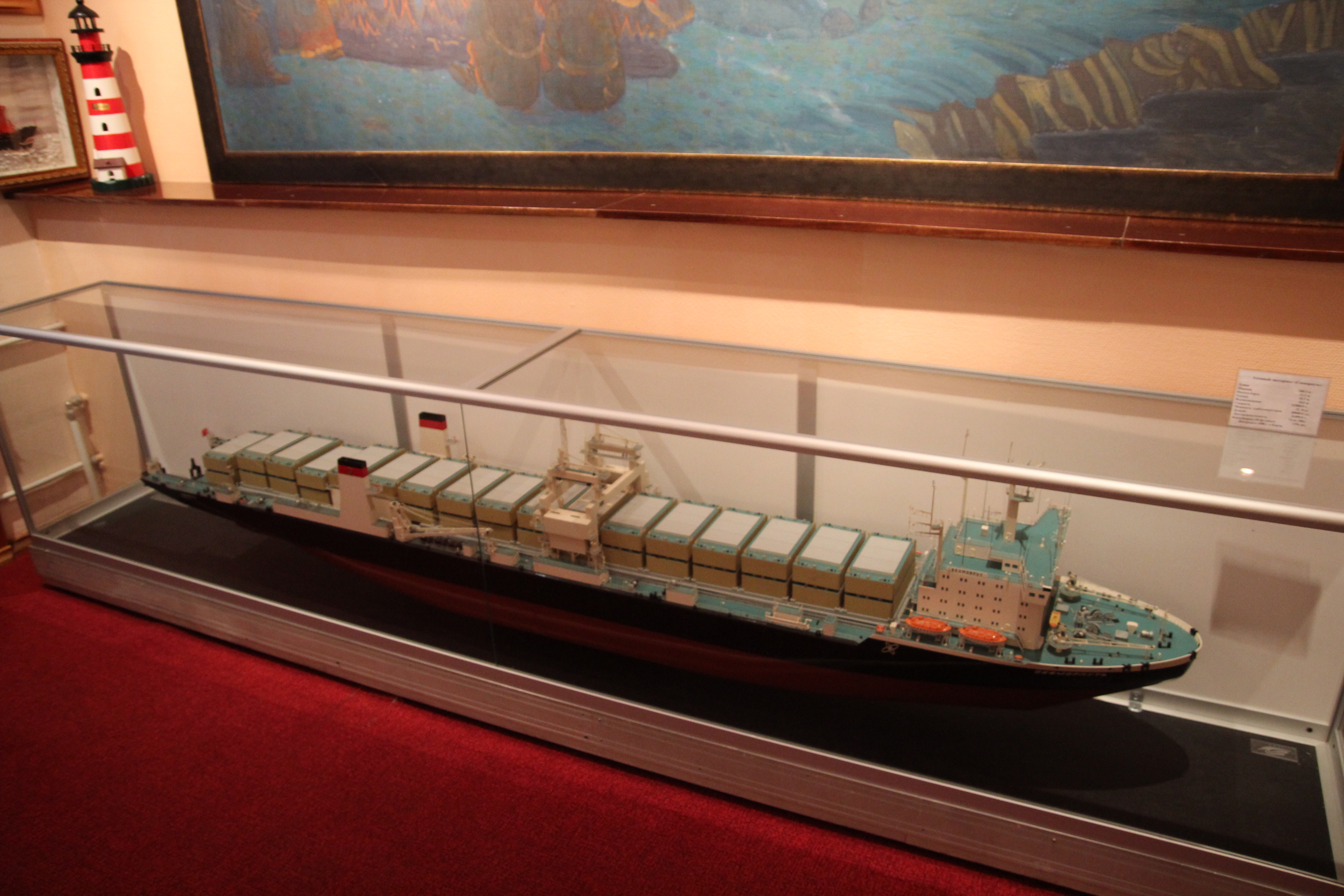
Model of Sevmorput

=== General characteristics ===
Sevmorput is 260.30 metres (854.0 ft) long overall and 236.60 metres (776.2 ft) between perpendiculars. The breadth and depth of her hull are 32.20 metres (105.6 ft) and 18.30 metres (60.0 ft), respectively. When loaded to the summer waterline, the ship draws 11.80 metres (38.7 ft) of water. However, in ice-covered waters she operates with a slightly smaller draught of 10.65 metres (34.9 ft) to improve the icebreaking characteristics of her raked stem. The gross tonnage of Sevmorput is 38,226 and net tonnage 11,468. The ship's deadweight tonnage is 33,980 tons at maximum draught and 26,480 tons while operating at reduced draught in ice. Her maximum displacement is 61,880 tons.

Although originally designed according to the USSR Register of Shipping rules of 1981 to the highest Soviet ice class available for merchant ships, ULA, Sevmorput is currently classified by the Russian Maritime Register of Shipping with a slightly lower ice class, UL. In addition to the national rules she was built according to the latest international regulations and conventions at the time, becoming the first ship built according to the Code of Safety for Nuclear Merchant Ships adopted by the International Maritime Organization in 1981. Special attention was paid to the safety aspects of the vessel and, in addition to running aground or colliding with the reinforced bow of an icebreaker, the Soviet naval architects even took into account the possibility of a passenger aircraft crashing on Sevmorput.

=== Power and propulsion ===
Sevmorput is powered by a single KLT-40 nuclear fission reactor with a thermal output of 135 megawatts. The reactor core contains 150.7 kilograms (332 lb) of 30–40- or 90-percent (Note: 90 % according to information provided to Norwegian government in 1990, 30–40 % according to Bellona Foundation citing communication with Murmansk Shipping Company. (Diakov, Anatoli C. et al.)) enriched uranium in uranium-zirconium alloy and has reportedly required refueling only twice. The nuclear power plant on board the vessel produces 215 tons of steam per hour at a pressure level of 40 atm (4.1 MPa) and temperature of 290 °C (554 °F). In case of emergency steam can also be produced by a diesel-powered boiler (50 t/h, 2.45 MPa, 360 °C).

Unlike the Russian Arktika- and Taymyr-class nuclear-powered icebreakers, which have three fixed-pitch propellers and utilize nuclear-turbo-electric powertrain, Sevmorput is propelled by a single 4-bladed ducted controllable-pitch propeller mechanically coupled to a GTZA 684 OM5 steam turbine which has a maximum output of 29,420 kW (39,450 hp) and turns the 6.7-metre (22 ft) propeller at 115 rpm. At full power the propulsion system gives the ship a maximum speed of 20.8 knots (38.5 km/h; 23.9 mph) at a draught of 10 metres (33 ft). She can also maintain a speed of 2 knots (3.7 km/h; 2.3 mph) in 1-metre (3.3 ft) thick level ice.

For electricity production Sevmorput has three 1,700 kW turbogenerators and three 2,000 kW standby diesel generators. In addition in case of blackout the vessel also has two 200 kW emergency diesel generators.

=== Cargo capacity and handling ===
Sevmorput can carry 74 lighters, each with a cargo capacity of 300 tons, in six holds and in two layers on the stern deck. The cargo hold hatches are designed for lighters with a total weight of 450 tons. The lighters are loaded and unloaded with a large gantry crane, manufactured by KONE, with a span of 21.3 metres (70 ft) and lifting capacity of 500 tons. The gantry crane has two three-ton auxiliary cranes.

When not carrying lighters, Sevmorput can carry both 20- and 40-foot containers weighing up to 20.3 and 30.5 tons, respectively, in three layers. The total container capacity of the ship is 1,328 twenty-foot equivalent units (TEU). While loading and unloading are usually done by shore-based cranes, a small number of containers can be handled with two container attachments to the gantry crane in ports that do not have cranes capable of handling containers. The lifting capacity of the attachments is 38 tons. Later, Sevmorput has been fitted with two Russian-manufactured 60-tonne hydraulic boom cranes with a lifting radius of 43 metres (140 ft). The new cranes can also be used in tandem to lift 120-tonne loads.

== See also ==
- Nuclear-powered icebreaker
- NS Mutsu
- NS Savannah
- NS Otto Hahn
