= Gasgrid Finland =

Finnish gas transmission company

Gasgrid Finland Oy
- Company type: Limited company (Oy)
- Industry: Oil and gas
- Predecessor: Gasum Oy
- Founded: 1 January 2020
- Headquarters: Espoo, Finland
- Area served: Finland
- Key people: Olli Sipilä (CEO); Kai-Petteri Purhonen (chairman)
- Services: Natural gas transmission
- Owner: Finnish Government
- Website: gasgrid.fi

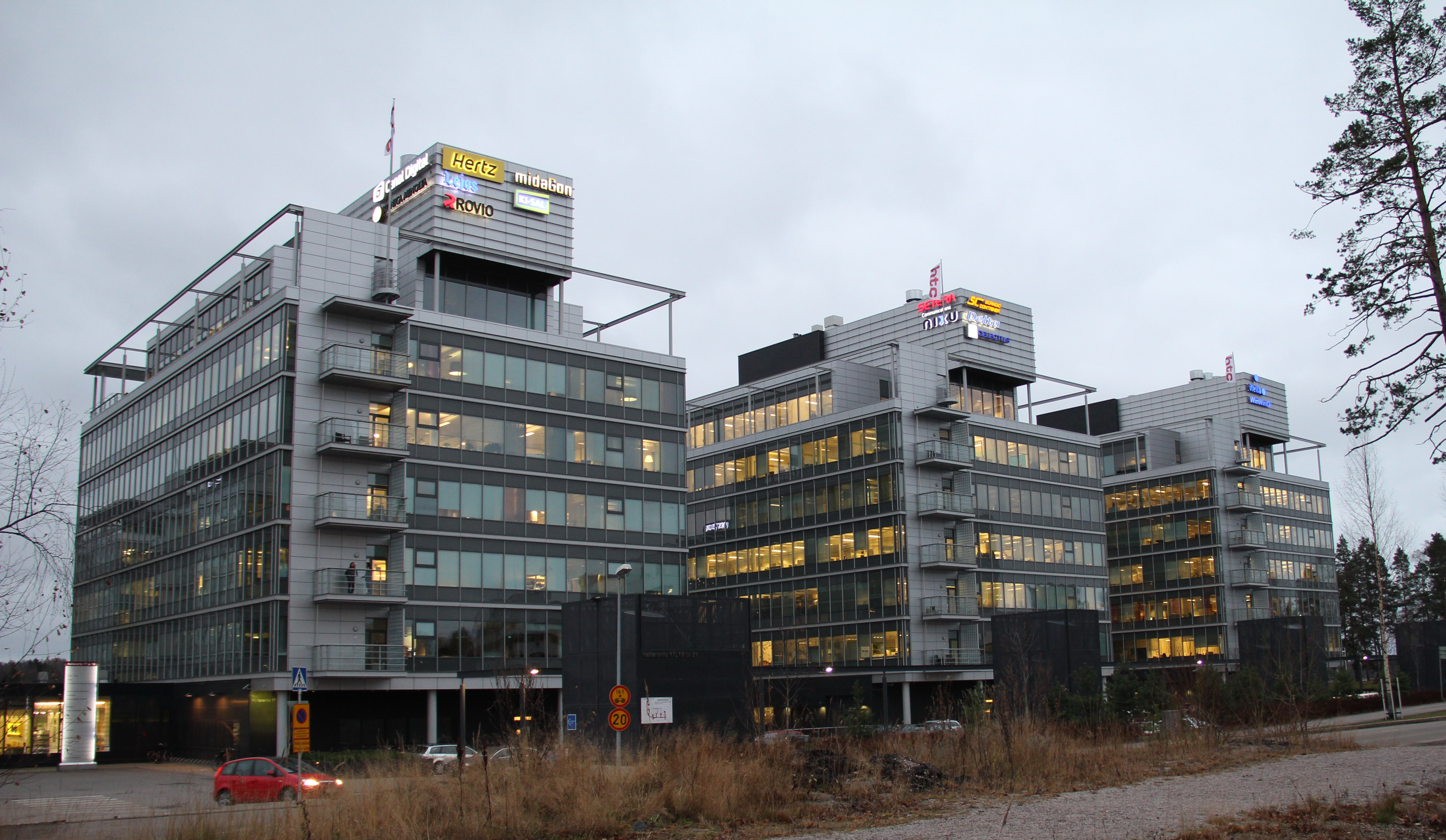

Gasgrid Finland Oy is a Finnish state-owned natural gas transmission system operator. Gasgrid Finland offers natural gas and biogas transmission services and is responsible for the gas transmission system operations in Finland. The CEO of Gasgrid Finland is Olli Sipilä.

Gasgrid Finland assumed the responsibility for gas transmission operations in Finland on 1 January 2020, when the Finnish gas market was opened for competition according to the EU Directive 2009/73/EC and the Finnish Natural Gas Market Act. The company was unbundled from Gasum, a state-majority-owned gas importer, producer, and seller. The ownership steering of Gasgrid Finland is located at the Ministry of Finance.

Gasgrid Finland owns and operates the Finnish gas transmission system across Southern Finland. Gas is imported to the Finnish gas grid through two cross-border entry points. The entry point in Imatra is used for importing Russian natural gas into Finland (flowing until 21 May 2022, 06.00 UTC+2), and the entry point in Ingå connects the Finnish and Estonian gas grids via the Balticconnector pipeline. The subsea connection enables a common gas market for Finland, Estonia and Latvia. The Hamina LNG terminal is to be connected to the Finnish gas grid in 2021. In addition, relatively small amounts of biogas is injected to the grid, and the future potential of e.g. clean synthetic gas, hydrogen and various gas-mixes are under consideration.

Gasgrid Finland is a member of the European Network of Transmission System Operators for Gas. Together with 22 other transmission system operators, Gasgrid Finland has also joined the European Hydrogen Backbone initiative.
