= Empower Group =

B2B services company in Finland

- Company type: Limited company
- Industry: Industry services
- Founded: 1998
- Headquarters: Helsinki, Finland
- Key people: Jussi Holopainen
- Website: www.enersense.com

Empower is a service company which operates in energy, industry and telecom sectors in the Nordic countries and in the Baltic region. Empower is part of Enersense International Oyj.

== History ==
Empower's roots are in a company called Pohjolan Voima. Its service company PVO-Palvelut Oy was named to Empower Oy in 1999.

== Business ==
The Empower Group's business operations are divided into four areas:

- Telecom Network Services
- Industry Services
- Power Network Services
