= Energy in Estonia =

Energy in Estonia has heavily depended on fossil fuels. Finland and Estonia are two of the last countries in the world still burning peat.

Estonia has set a target of 100% of electricity production from renewable sources by 2030 and climate neutrality by 2050.

In response to geopolitical tensions, Estonia reduced its reliance on Russian energy sources by halting imports of Russian pipeline gas in April 2022 and banning all Russian natural gas and oil product imports, including LNG, by September 2022. In December 2022, Estonia reinforced its stance by prohibiting the purchase and transfer of crude oil and oil products from Russia.

== Statistics ==
2020 energy statistics

Production capacities for electricity (billion kWh)
Type	Amount
Fossil fuel	3.29
Biomass	1.61
Wind power	0.84
Solar	0.12
Hydro	0.04
Total	5.90

Electricity (billion kWh)
Category	Amount
Consumption	9.17
Production	5.90
Import	7.37
Export	3.72

Crude Oil (barrels per day)
Consumption	27,500
Production	21,800

Natural Gas (billion m^{3})
Consumption	0.417
Import	0.417

CO_{2} emissions:
7.12 million tons

== Energy plan and targets ==
The National Energy and Climate Plan published in 2019 aims to reduce greenhouse gas emissions by 70% by 2030 and by 80% by 2050. Renewable energy must be at least 42%, with a target of 16 TWh in 2030.

The plan was changed in October 2022, when Estonia set a target date of 2030 to generate 100% electricity from renewables.

According to the International Energy Agency's (IEA) 2023 Energy Review Policy, Estonia's energy strategy aims to achieve climate neutrality by 2050. One of the primary objectives outlined is the attainment of 100% renewable electricity by 2030. This commitment is supported by a comprehensive set of policy frameworks, including the Energy Sector Development Plan until 2030 and the National Energy and Climate Plan (NECP). Estonia revised its NECP in June 2023 to align with the European Climate Law, the Fit-for-55 package, and REPowerEU, with finalization expected in 2024. Additionally, Estonia has recently established a Ministry of Climate, which oversees various sectors, including energy, and is responsible for executing the green transition, formulating climate policy, promoting cleaner technologies, and conserving the environment.

== Energy security ==
Amidst geopolitical tensions, Estonia took decisive action to reduce its reliance on Russian energy sources, particularly in response to Russia's invasion of Ukraine. Previously heavily dependent on Russian imports for natural gas and oil products, Estonia ceased importing Russian pipeline gas in April 2022 and implemented a ban on all imports and purchases of Russian natural gas, including liquefied natural gas (LNG), in September 2022. In December 2022, Estonia further reinforced its stance by prohibiting the purchase and transfer of crude oil and oil products from Russia. To address its energy needs, Estonia now relies on pipeline connections to LNG terminals in Klaipeda, Lithuania, and the new Inkoo LNG terminal in Finland. Eesti Gaas, the main gas supplier, has secured deals to bring LNG cargoes from these terminals by autumn 2023.

== Energy types ==
=== Renewable energy ===
According to the International Renewable Energy Agency (IRENA), in 2020, renewable energy accounted for 32% of Estonia's Total Energy Supply (TES). The composition of this renewable energy mix was heavily dominated by bioenergy, which represented 93% of renewables. Wind energy made a 5% contribution, and hydro and marine sources combined for 2%, with solar energy having a minimal impact.

Years in which the last three renewable power levels achieved
Achievement	Year	Achievement	Year	Achievement	Year
30%	2019	35%	2020	40%	2020

==== Biomass ====
In 2020, biomass constituted 29.8% of Estonia's Total Energy Supply (TES). This figure was derived from the renewable energy sector's 32% contribution to the TES, with biomass making up 93% of the renewable energy mix.

==== Wind ====
Wind power had a capacity of 320MW in 2020 however investment continues with a €200m 255MW Sopi-Tootsi wind project planned to be operational by 2024.

==== Solar ====
Solar power has received investment since 2014. In 2022, Estonian solar power plants produced 2,569 gigawatt-hours (GWh) of renewable energy. 26 million euros were paid in subsidies for electricity produced via solar power in 2022.

==== Hydro ====
In August 2022, Eesti Energia announced the start of development for Estonia's first pumped-storage hydroelectric power plant (PSH). The project is located in the Estonia Mine industrial area in Ida-Virumaa and aims to become operational by 2026. Designed to utilize mining residues and closed oil shale mining tunnels, the project has a planned capacity of 225 MW. It aims to enhance energy security and the stability of the power network, particularly in anticipation of Estonia's planned disconnection from the Russian energy system. The plant is expected to act as a significant energy storage unit, facilitating the integration of renewable energy into the grid.

=== Fossil fuels ===
==== Oil-shale ====
Oil-shale powered generators in 2019 accounted for 70% of electricity generation in Estonia.

The original target to reduce production from oil-shale was 2035 with production ceasing by 2040, has been changed to ceasing oil-shale production by 2030.

Between 2018 and 2022 oil-shale extraction and use reduced by 50%.

The country's reliance on oil shale has decreased but remains its primary energy source. Between 2011 and 2021, the share of oil shale dropped from 71% to 60% in total energy supply and from 85% to 48% in electricity generation, rebounding to 57% in 2022. This reduction improved Estonia's carbon intensity, dropping it from the 3rd highest in the IEA in 2017 to the 18th highest in 2022.

==== Natural gas ====
Estonia has the Balticconnector pipeline, which links Estonia with Finland.

In April 2022 Estonia reduced gas imports from Russia and on 29 September 2022 Estonia banned buying natural gas from Russia. Work began on LNG facilities at Paldiski which was completed in October 2022 and increased transmission capacities in existing interconnection points.

In December 2022 a floating LNG terminal became operational in Finland which connects to Estonia.

== Electricity ==
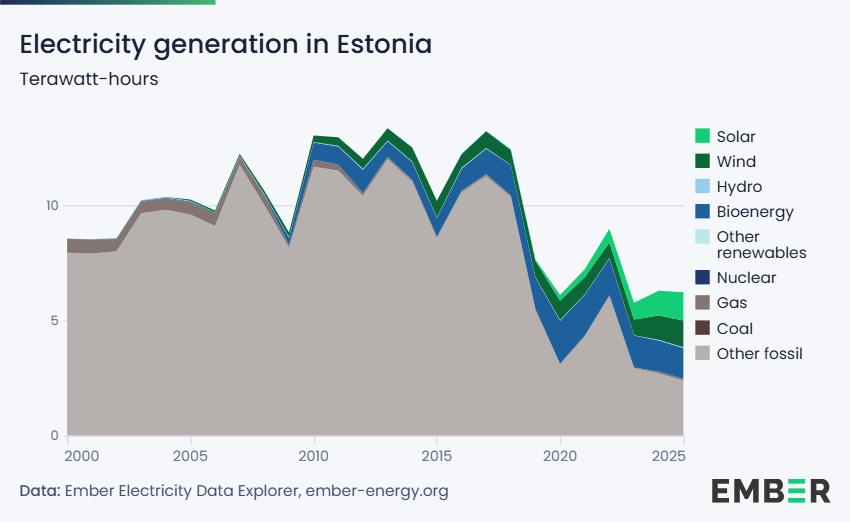
Electricity generation in Estonia in terawatt-hours

Electricity production in Estonia is largely dependent on fossil fuels. In 2007, more than 90% of power was generated from oil shale. The Estonian energy company Eesti Energia owns the largest oil shale-fuelled power plants in the world, Narva Power Plants.

There are two submarine power cables from Finland, with combined rated power of 1000 MW.

Estonia's all-time peak consumption is 1591 MW (in 2021).

It was agreed in 2018 that Estonia, Latvia and Lithuania will connect to the European Union's electricity system and desynchronize from the Russian BRELL power system, this is expected to be completed by February 2025. An interconnector linking the Lithuania with Poland is to be built, called the Harmony Link Interconnector which will be instrumental in stabilising the new system.

A back up plan, should Russia disconnect the Baltic states before 2025, would enable a connection to the European grid to be completed within 24 hours.

== Transport sector ==
In February 2013, Estonia had a network of 165 fast chargers for electric cars (for a population of 1.3 million). This grew to 400 in 2022.

== See also ==
- Energy in Latvia
- Energy in Lithuania
