= International Gas Union =

International Gas Union (IGU)
- Abbreviation: IGU
- Formation: 1931
- Type: NGO
- Legal status: not-for-profit
- Purpose: Spokesperson for the Gas industry worldwide
- Headquarters: London, United Kingdom
- Location: London, United Kingdom
- Region served: All
- Members: 140
- President: Mr Andrea Stegher (2025 - 2028)
- Secretary General: Menelaos (Mel) Ydreos
- Vice President: Cav. Eng. Khaled AbuBakr
- Main organ: Council
- Website: https://www.igu.org/
- Remarks: Spokesperson of the Global Gas Industry

The International Gas Union (IGU) is the spokesperson of the global Gas industry, with members in over 70 countries across the globe, covering over 90% of the global Gas market across every segment of the value chain, from the supply of natural and decarbonised gas, renewable gas and hydrogen, through to their transmission and distribution, and all the way to the point of use.

IGU presents the world’s leading international Gas events, including the World Gas Conference (WGC2025), the International Conference and Exhibition on Liquefied Natural Gas (LNG2026), and the International Gas Research Conference (IGRC2027) series.

The IGU also publishes the global Gas industry’s annual flagship reports: Wholesale Gas Price Survey, World LNG Report, and the Global Gas Report, as well as various special reports, such as "Gas for Africa", "Introduction to Low Carbon Gas Technologies" and "The Role of Gas for East Mediterranean Economies and the Path to the Energy Transition”. IGU has also released its Manifesto.

The International Gas Union (IGU) was founded in 1931, and is registered in Vevey, Switzerland with the Secretariat located in London, United Kingdom.

IGU encourages international trade in Gas by supporting non-discriminatory policies and sound contracting principles and practices, and by promoting development of technologies which add to the environmental benefits of gas and further enhance safe production, transmission, distribution and utilisation of Gas.

Ever since its establishment almost a century ago, the IGU has constantly advocated for the role of Gas for human progress and global growth, serving as the spokesperson for the Gas industry worldwide.

IGU also publishes a quarterly magazine, "Gas in Transition".
