= Joint European Union Intelligence School =

Permanent Structured Cooperation project

The Joint European Union Intelligence School (JEIS) is a project of the Permanent Structured Cooperation (PESCO) that was announced in November 2018. The project will be led by Cyprus and Greece. The school will provide education and training in intelligence disciplines, among other things, to EU member states intelligence personnel, and develop new hardware, including drones and electronic warfare technology.

== See also ==
- Common Security and Defence Policy
  - European External Action Service
    - Club de Berne
    - European Union Intelligence and Situation Centre
  - European Security and Defence College
  - European Union Institute for Security Studies
  - European Union Satellite Centre
  - Intelligence College in Europe
  - Permanent Structured Cooperation
- European Centre of Excellence for Countering Hybrid Threats
- Five Eyes
- NATO Centres of Excellence
- NATO Defense College
- NATO School
