= International reactions to the 2016 United Kingdom European Union membership referendum =

Responses from other countries to the Brexit vote

International reactions to the United Kingdom European Union membership referendum of 2016 are the reactions to the decision to leave the European Union by the United Kingdom. The main reaction was on global financial markets experiencing extreme volatility.

== International responses ==
=== European Union ===
European Union

- President of the European Commission Jean-Claude Juncker said that the result "would not be the beginning of the end of the EU." He later added that he does not expect an "amicable divorce" but it was never "a tight love affair anyway." He called for urgency on separation, even though the EU has no authority to force the invocation of Article 50 of the Lisbon Treaty, as "it doesn't make any sense to wait until October to try and negotiate the terms of their departure. I would like to get started immediately."
  - President of the European Council Donald Tusk said: "This is not a moment for hysterical reactions. Today on behalf of the 27 leaders I can say that we are determined to keep our unity as 27. Until the UK formally leaves the EU, EU law will continue to apply to and within the UK, and by this I mean rights, as well as obligations. All the procedures for the withdrawal of the UK from the EU are set out in the treaties. In order to discuss the details, I have offered an informal meeting of the 27 in the margins of the European council next week. I have also proposed we start a wider reflection of the future of our union.
- President of the European Parliament Martin Schulz said: "We respect the result. We have clarity for the UK to go its own way. Now is the time for us to behave seriously and responsibly. David Cameron has his responsibilities for his country, we have our responsibilities for the future of the EU. You can see what is happening to sterling on the markets. I don't want the same thing to happen to the euro." He added that "we expect the British government to deliver now."
- The European Central Bank issued a statement which read: "Following the outcome of the UK referendum, the European Central Bank is closely monitoring financial markets and is in close contact with other central banks. The ECB stands ready to provide additional liquidity, if needed, in euro and foreign currencies. The ECB has prepared for this contingency in close contact with the banks that it supervises and considers that the euro area banking system is resilient in terms of capital and liquidity."
- Leader of the European People's Party and German Christian Social Union MEP Manfred Weber wrote: "Exit negotiations should be concluded within 2 years at max. There cannot be any special treatment. Leave means leave."
- French Left Party MEP Jean-Luc Mélenchon said: "This is the end of a world that begins with this Brexit. This teaches a lesson to the whole of Europe; either we change it or we leave it. This is the time for a plan B."
- Independent Irish MEP Luke 'Ming' Flanagan commented: "[The] Irish government now needs to step up to the plate at [the] European Council...No barriers to trade with our biggest trading partner" and that the European Union had "crumbled under its own weight in arrogance."
- Polish MEP Danuta Hubner suggested the potential disuse of English as working language of the European Union:"We have a regulation where every EU country has the right to notify one official language. The Irish have notified Gaelic and the Maltese have notified Maltese, so you have only the UK notifying English...if you do not have the UK, you do not have English." German EU Commissioner Gunther Oettinger added: "We have a series of member states that speak English, and English is the world language which we all accept;" he also suggested that if Scotland was to join separately it could apply for English as their primary language.
- The UK EU commissioner, Jonathan Hill, resigned on 25 June ahead of a vote in the EU parliament initiated by EPP, S&D, ALDE and Greens asking for his removal. He said, "I don’t believe it is right that I should carry on as the British commissioner as though nothing had happened". Latvia's Valdis Dombrovskis took over his portfolio (financial stability and services).

Member States

- Austria – Chancellor Christian Kern said: "I do not fear a domino effect." However, he added that "Europe will lose status and significance in the world because of Britain’s step. The long-term economic effects will also be felt for some time."
  - Foreign Minister Sebastian Kurz said that "a domino effect on other countries cannot be ruled out." Although he added that the EU as a whole would survive.
  - The Freedom Party's (FPÖ) former presidential candidate Norbert Hofer, who lost narrowly in the 2016 Austrian presidential election (before it was annulled), warned Austria could hold an Auxit referendum on EU membership within a year. "The founding fathers [of the EU] wanted to ensure closer economic cooperation because states that cooperate economically do not wage war against each other. That worked very well until the political union was founded. If a course is set within a year further towards centralisation instead of taking [the EU’s] core values into account, then we must ask Austrians whether they want to be members."
  - Leader of the Freedom Party of Austria Heinz-Christian Strache demanded the EU's Juncker should resign "out of decency and out of respect for a better future for Europe."
- Belgium – Prime Minister Charles Michel said that EU member states should meet to "define priorities and set out a new future for Europe."
- Bulgaria – Prime Minister Boyko Borisov said of potential contagion that "only Bulgaria, Romania and Greece will remain when the domino effect is set off."
- Czech Republic – President Miloš Zeman said that the result could have an unpleasant influence on the European Union because the United Kingdom will no longer balance French and German influence. He also noted that he was disappointed by the result and that it could worsen the economic conditions in the Czech Republic. Zeman later said that he would hold a referendum about leaving the European Union even though he would like to vote for remain in such a referendum.
  - Prime Minister Bohuslav Sobotka said that the result is "not the end of the world, nor it is the end of the European Union. He also said Europe should change because the project needs stronger support of citizens. After going for an EU summit, he added: "We need to reaffirm the benefits of European integration for growth and security in Europe. We need to make the EU ideas more attractive for people. A new plan of relations between the EU and Britain is needed. We should take into account that a lot of Britons want their country to stay in the EU." Deputy Prime Minister and Finance Minister Andrej Babiš said the European Union should respect the decision and should not force remaining countries to stronger integration. Foreign Minister Lubomír Zaorálek urged Juncker to resign, saying he was a "negative symbol" of federalism that British voters rejected.
  - The ODS issued a statement that read the result was "the last warning before others will go." It also called for change in functioning and strategy of European Union. Leader of the party Petr Fiala said that the Czech Republic "should reconsider its existence in European Union" and negotiate new conditions for the country.
  - Eurosceptic parties welcomed the result and called for a similar referendum. The Party of Free Citizens called for similar referendum because "European Union has changed since 2003 and three million newly eligible citizens could not vote at the time due to their age. Freedom and Direct Democracy stated that it will propose, in parliament, a referendum on the withdrawal of the Czech Republic from the European Union. Senator Ivo Valenta called for a "Czexit" and criticised the European Union for bad legislation, bad immigration policy and for having an army of bureaucrats.
- Denmark – Prime Minister Lars Løkke Rasmussen said that the result is "very sad for Denmark but it will be respected" and that "the British referendum does not change the fact that Denmark belongs in the EU. The EU is Denmark's best opportunity to influence the world that we are a part of for better or worse. We can do some things better alone, but we are stronger together. Denmark and the Danish economy are highly dependent on the European community."
  - Leader of Danish People's Party Kristian Thulesen Dahl praised the result but added that it's too early for Denmark to have a similar vote. "It will probably take a few a years, and I believe that Denmark should push that Britain gets the best possible deal, and after that, it will be quite natural to ask the Danish people whether they want to go the way of the British."
- Finland – Minister for Foreign Affairs and the leader of the Finns Party Timo Soini said that "the nation has had its say" and that "any retaliation and whinge is out of the question."
  - Teija Tiilikainen, the director of the Finnish Institute of International Affairs, stated that "Brexit seems to have had a strong impact on Finnish attitudes toward the EU,"
  - Kaj Turunen, a Finns Party Member of Parliament and the chairman of the Parliament of Finland's commerce committee, stated that this was not the time for Finland to leave the Eurozone.
- France – President Francois Hollande said: "I profoundly regret this decision for the United Kingdom and for Europe, but the choice is theirs and we have to respect it." He later said that it "will be painful for Britain but... as in all divorces, it will be painful for those who stay behind, too." Prime Minister Manuel Valls said: "At stake is the breakup, pure and simple, of the union. Now is the time to invent another Europe." Economy Minister Emmanuel Macron accused the UK of taking the EU "hostage" with a referendum called to solve a domestic political problem of eurosceptics and that "the failure of the British government [has opened up] the possibility of the crumbling of Europe."
  - Les Republicains Mayor of Calais Natacha Bouchart said: "The British must take the consequences of their choice. We are in a strong position to push, to press this request for a review and we are asking the president [Francois Hollande] to bring his weight [to the issue]...there must be an element of division, of sharing." Leader for the Paris region Valérie Pécresse wrote: "It's a thunderbolt. Nobody believed this could happen. I was convinced nobody would choose to undo what we have strived so long to build. We need to rethink Europe. The French must know that the EU protects them. We need a Europe that is more democratic and less bureaucratic."
  - Front National leader Marine Le Pen wrote: "Victory for freedom! As I have been asking for years, now we need to have the same referendum in France and in the countries of the EU." She also said: "I'll be Madame Frexit if the European Union doesn't give us back our monetary, legislative, territorial and budget sovereignty." Her niece and party member, Marion Marechal-Le Pen wrote: "From #Brexit to #Frexit: It's now time to import democracy to our country. The French must have the right to choose!"
  - France Arise leader Nicolas Dupont-Aignan commented "For half a century the elites claim to 'build' Europe on the backs of citizens or against them on the grounds they would be unable, intellectually and morally, to adhere to the so-called grand project. But people are not as stupid or as their malicious rulers hope. So they came to understand the real intention of this [so-called] 'Europe' war machine against the countries, democracy and social justice. No offense to many commentators, the people are and always have been stronger than oligarchies, freedom always prevails over the dictatorship."
  - Ambassador to the U.S. Gerard Araud wrote: "Now to the other Members states to save the EU from unravelling which excludes business as usual, especially in Brussels. Reform or die!"
- Germany – Chancellor Angela Merkel said, after a meeting with her Austrian counterpart, that Europe should discuss the result "together and in calm," while warning against hectic reactions. She noted the referendum result would be tabled during an EU summit in Brussels the following week. She added that "today marks a turning point for Europe. It is a turning point for the European unification process." She re-iterated her desire to avoid "ugly negotiations" and that "Great Britain needs to say which kind of relationship it imagines having with the EU. [Those talks should be] matter-of-fact [and] shouldn’t drag on forever." Further noting: "Britain will remain a close partner, with which we are linked economically."
  - President Frank-Walter Steinmeier characterized the conduct of the Leave campaign, as “irresponsible”.
  - Vice-Chancellor Sigmar Gabriel wrote: "Damn! A bad day for Europe." Foreign Minister Frank-Walter Steinmeier wrote: "The news from Britain is really sobering. It looks like a sad day for Europe and Britain."
  - Ruling Christian Democratic Union MP Norbert Röttgen said the result was the "biggest catastrophe in the history of European integration."
  - Alternative for Germany's Frauke Petry wrote that the result was a warning that "if the EU does not abandon its quasi-socialist experiment of ever greater integration then the European people will follow the Brits and take back their sovereignty."
- Greece – Prime minister Alexis Tsipras in a televised address to the country argued that "it was a difficult day for Europe" and that "the EU has been dealt a blow." He also underlined that the result is respected and estimated that the message had long been sent, as reflected by the rise of euroskepticism in Europe. He further noted that the gap is widening and a "return to the so-called security of national entrenchment" will lead to a dead end and that an immediate change of course is necessary to defend against the rise of such movements. He summed it up as a "negative development" and that the European migrant crisis was partly to blame for the result.
  - Popular Unity issued a statement that read it was now "more urgent for leaving the Eurozone and the indisciplined neoliberal EU" and that "after the political earthquake of Brexit, Europe and the world can not remain the same."
  - New Democracy MP Dora Bakoyannis said: "The cost of populism emerged today in all its glory. Mr Cameron is bearing great responsibility. It's a hard day for Europe and an even harder day for the UK."
- Ireland – The Taoiseach Enda Kenny stated that "This result clearly has very significant implications for Ireland, as well as for Britain and for the European Union."
  - The Green Party described the decision as "a huge blow to the European Union" but said that, "We have to respect their decision, and manage the consequences for Ireland as best as we can." Its statement restated a commitment to Europe and said that, "It is only by sharing sovereignty that we can tackle the biggest issues facing our society. Yesterday's vote is a challenge for every pro-European to consider how we can restore faith in our Union."
  - The People Before Profit Alliance welcomed the exit vote and issued a statement that read: "Over the last two years the EU has been shown for what it is – a prison house for workers that fosters racism, xenophobia and austerity."
- Hungary – Prime Minister Viktor Orbán stated that he respects the decision and that "Brussels should hear the voice of the people." He has also emphasised the need to carry out reforms on the structure of the European Union which "was unable to adequately respond to weighty issues such as the ongoing migrant crisis." Foreign Minister Péter Szijjártó declared "a strong Europe is in everyone's interests, but this can only be realised if the EU provides real solutions to major challenges, because Europe cannot be strong if the solutions it provides weaken member states and the European Union."
- Italy – Foreign Minister Paolo Gentiloni said: "The decision of the British voters must be a wake-up call."
  - The Five Star Movement also issued a statement that called for a referendum on membership in the Eurozone.
  - Lega Nord leader Matteo Salvini wrote: "Hurrah for the courage of free citizens! Heart, brain and pride defeated lies, threats and blackmail. THANK YOU UK, now it's our turn." He also called for a referendum on membership in the EU.
  - Brothers of Italy President Giorgia Meloni reacted in saying that "the vote of British citizens is a vote for freedom and choice to reiterate that the sovereignty belongs to the people and that is not in the availability of business committees and lobbies that today govern European institutions. It is a brave choice that we believe we should follow. The EU can not be reformed because it is rotten from its foundations, it must be completely closed and reopened on diametrically opposite assumptions. We demand the resignation of Mr Juncker and of the entire European Commission and the start of whole new season." Commenting on the reaction to the vote by the European Commission, she added: "Since when do Brussels bureaucrats have the power to declare war to other states? Who decided to now open hostilities against the United Kingdom? These technocrats are on a full power trip, the sooner we get rid of them the better it will be for Europe, the real one."
- Luxembourg – Foreign Minister Jean Asselborn said: "It cannot be ruled out that Brexit leads to a domino effect in Eastern Europe. [It had been a] historic mistake." He suspected that a meeting earlier in the year between Cameron and the head of Poland's ruling Law and Justice Party (PiS) Jaroslaw Kaczynski had a gentleman's agreement on rolling back European integration. "Both seem do have the same agenda regarding their critical stance toward the EU."
- Netherlands – Prime Minister Mark Rutte said: "The dissatisfaction you see in Britain is also present in other countries, including my own. This has to be a stimulus for more reform, more welfare." He added: "First the British have to decide when they want to start the process of leaving."
  - MP and Dutch Freedom Party leader Geert Wilders wrote in congratulations of the outcome and that it is "Time for a Dutch referendum!"
- Poland – Foreign Minister Witold Waszczykowski said: "Brexit is bad news for Britain and Europe. It is a sign the EU concept needs to change."
- Portugal – Prime Minister António Costa said that country's economic recovery will survive the result and that it had "sent a very strong signal" that many Europeans no longer identified themselves "with what the EU has become." He also invoked the world's "oldest alliance" between Portugal and the United Kingdom and said that Portugal will keep strong economic relations with the United Kingdom.
- Slovakia – Prime Minister Robert Fico said that Slovakia respects the decision to leave the European Union and further noted that it is not a "tragedy but a reality". He also said that the European Union should change its policy because many people are not satisfied with its migration and economic policies. He added that the result would influence the Slovak six-month tenure as president of the European Commission.
- Spain - Acting Foreign Minister Jose Manuel Garcia-Margallo called for joint control over the disputed territory of Gibraltar, which voted overwhelmingly in favour of remaining in the EU. "It's a complete change of outlook that opens up new possibilities on Gibraltar not seen for a very long time. I hope the formula of co-sovereignty – to be clear, the Spanish flag on the Rock – is much closer than before." Gibraltar Chief Minister Fabian Picardo, however, immediately dismissed the remarks, stating that "there will be no talks, or even talks about talks, about the sovereignty of Gibraltar." He also called on Gibraltar's residents "to ignore these noises."
  - The Spanish People's Party issued a statement in regards to the election three days later that, as a result of the UK vote, Spain needed "stability" in the face of "radicalism" and "populism." It was also read as an attack on the Unidos Podemos coalition that vowed to fight for the least well-off. The latter's leader Pablo Iglesias said that Europe had to "change course. No-one would want to leave Europe if it were fair and united."
  - Catalonia - President of the Generalitat of Catalonia Carles Puigdemont praised the result, while the Catalan National Assembly President Jordi Sànchez i Picanyol called for a referendum to be held in Catalonia to separate from Spain, despite the previous Catalan election being held as a de facto referendum on independence after the Spanish Constitutional Court disallowed a de jure one.
- Sweden – Prime Minister Stefan Löfven said that Sweden will respect the decision of British citizens even though it will be hard for them. However, he added that this was a "wake-up call" for the EU and that it must show it can respond to people's expectations. He also called for unity and said negotiations with the UK should be allowed to take time and that it is important to maintain good relations with the UK. A few days later, he said "Boris Johnson put forward a vision that the UK shall have free access to the EU, but be able to regulate immigration themselves. Sounds like they want the rights, but no obligations. This will not happen. Leaving the union will make a difference.
  - The Left Party issued a statement that called for the country’s government to renegotiate the terms of its adhesion to the EU.
  - Of the Alliance coalition, the Moderate Party leader Anna Kinberg Batra expressed regret at the result and Centre Party leader Annie Lööf called it a "nightmare."
  - Sweden Democrats' leader Jimmie Åkesson said: "We demand that Sweden immediately starts to renegotiate the (EU) deals we have made and that the Swedish people will be able to speak up about a future EU-membership in a referendum."

Multilateral

After hosting talks with his counterparts from France, Italy, the Netherlands, Belgium and Luxembourg the following day, Germany's Walter-Steinmeier said that "we now have to open the possibility for dealing with Europe’s future. That is why we jointly say: This process should start as soon as possible." France's Jean-Marc Ayrault said: "We demand that the 27 other member countries also get respect. That’s one of the reasons we came to Berlin today." He added: "There is a certain urgency ... so that we don't have a period of uncertainty, with financial consequences, political consequences." Luxembourg's Asselborn's said: "I believe you can destroy the European Union with referenda. We have to communicate better what the EU has done, and we have to work harder on issues such as migration where we have failed." A joint statement also read: "We now expect the UK government to provide clarity and give effect to this decision as soon as possible."

=== Supranational bodies ===
- Bank for International Settlements (BIS): Chief Economist Claudio Borio said: "Brexit is one of the possible shocks to the economic outlook, but we emphasize much more the buildup of endogenous problems. It’s very tempting for policy makers to react strongly to market jitters. Given how far away we are from normality, we should be able to see through them. If you have any fiscal space, of the various possible uses, getting the banking system into shape is probably priority number one."
- The G7 was expected to make a statement in regards to whether there is any coordinated intervention to ease monetary policy by global central banks.
- NATO: Secretary-General Jens Stoltenberg said: "The UK will remain a strong and committed NATO ally and will continue to play its leading role in our alliance."
- Commonwealth of Nations: Secretary-General Baroness Patricia Scotland said she remained "hugely, hugely positive" and added "The fact that the United Kingdom made the decision to come out has put this on turbocharge, I believe that now that the UK has made its decision, the Commonwealth will become more pivotally important than it has ever been. Did the Commonwealth want it? I don’t think they did. Will they work incredibly hard to with all its members to derive the new benefits that may be available? Absolutely. Lots of people were really, really frightened about what would happen if the United Kingdom came out of Brexit. You are always more frightened about something before it happens than when it has happened. You have just got to get on with and deal with it" she told the House of Lords international relations committee.
- G7: The UK economy is "resilient" to the impact of the EU referendum vote, G7 finance ministers and central bank governors have said in a statement. They added they said steps had been taken to "ensure adequate liquidity and to support the functioning of markets" and that they were ready to use "established liquidity instruments to that end. We affirm our assessment that the UK economy and financial sector remain resilient and are confident that the UK authorities are well-positioned to address the consequences of the referendum outcome. We recognize that excessive volatility and disorderly movements in exchange rates can have adverse implications for economic and financial stability. We remain united and continue to maintain our solidarity as G7."
- United Nations: Secretary General Ban Ki-moon's spokesperson issued a statement that read "as the United Kingdom and other EU member states embark on the process of charting a way forward, the secretary general trusts in Europe's well-proven history of pragmatism and common responsibility in the interest of European citizens" and that "at the UN, we look forward to continuing our work with the United Kingdom and the European Union - both important partners...the secretary general expects the European Union to continue to be a solid partner for the United Nations on development and humanitarian issues, as well as peace and security, including migration. He also expects that the United Kingdom will continue to exercise its leadership in many areas, including development. He very much hopes that this will continue."
- World Trade Organization: Director-General Roberto Azevêdo wrote: "The British people have spoken. The WTO stands ready to work with the UK and the EU to assist them in any way we can."
- The European Free Trade Association (EFTA): Which the UK co-founded in 1960, Swiss President Johann Schneider-Ammann said that the UK's return would strengthen the association.
- Confederation of Indian Industry (CII): President & Co-chairman Forbes Marshall, Naushad Forbes said, "India-UK relations will sustain with or without Britain’s relationship with the EU and will only thrive and prosper in the years ahead". He also said that the exit might speed up the India UK Free Trade Agreement. India has been negotiating a Free Trade Agreement with the EU for over nine years. India is the third largest investor in the UK economy. CII President also led a delegation of high profile CEOs to the UK to discuss the post Brexit opportunities and the Free Trade Agreement.
- International Monetary Fund (IMF): Director Christine Lagarde said "We urge the authorities in the UK and Europe to work collaboratively to ensure a smooth transition to a new economic relationship between the UK and the EU, including by clarifying the procedures and broad objectives that will guide the process."

=== Sovereign states/entities ===
- Australia: Prime Minister Malcolm Turnbull said: "The impact on Australia immediately, directly, from a legal point of view, will be very limited because it will take some years for the United Kingdom to leave the European Union, to negotiate an exit. However, we've seen already large falls on stock markets and there will be a degree of uncertainty for some time." He added that this was a "momentous and historic decision." He also insisted "there is no cause for Australians to be alarmed by these developments" and that "it is important to remember that the Australian economy is strong and resilient and has weathered global shocks before and weathered them well." On the campaign trail less than a week before an election, he said: "The upheaval reminds us there are many things in the global economy over which we have no control. Calm heads, steady hands, stable government and a strong economic plan are critical for Australia to withstand any repercussions. Always expect the unexpected. We will need to renegotiate vital trade deals with Britain and Europe."
- Bahrain: An unnamed spokesperson of the Bahraini government said that it honoured the decision of its "British ally" and also stressed its commitment to strengthen relationship between the two countries, as well as with the EU to "consolidate peace and security in the region."
- Bosnia and Herzegovina: Prime Minister Denis Zvizdic said that Bosnia is determined to join the EU as "nowhere on this planet people live better." The Croat member of the Bosnian presidency, Dragan Covic, who submitted Bosnia's membership application in February, said Britain's vote was just another challenge that will make the bloc stronger.
- Brazil: The Itamaraty Palace issued a statement that read the country remains an EU partner, but that it will work to strengthen relations between Brazil and the United Kingdom. It also read with "respect" the outcome of the referendum and trust that this decision will not deter the process of European integration.
- Canada: Prime Minister Justin Trudeau said "The people of the UK have chosen to leave the EU. The UK and the EU are important strategic partners for Canada with whom we enjoy deep historical ties and common values. We will continue to build relations with both parties as they forge a new relationship...Prime Minister David Cameron indicated today that he will resign by the fall. On behalf of all Canadians, I would like to thank him for being such a close ally and good friend to our country. We wish him well."
- China, People's Republic: Just hours after the vote, the Beijing-based Global Times, which often expresses the views of the Chinese Communist Party (CCP), said that "Britons are already showing a losing mind-set. They may become citizens of a nation that prefers to shut itself from the outside world." Later the Spokesperson for the Foreign Ministry Hua Chunying said "A prosperous Europe is in the interests of all parties and China is willing to keep co-operating with Britain and is fully confident in China-EU ties."
- Colombia: After meeting with President Juan Manuel Santos, Minister of Commerce, Industry and Tourism Maria Lacouture proposed, on behalf of the Pacific Alliance, to jointly negotiate a free trade agreement with the United Kingdom. She said that "rather than individual countries negotiating trade deals with the UK, it should renegotiate as a block...the proposal we want to develop is a deal that presents a great opportunity for Colombia, Chile, Mexico and Peru."
- Holy See: Pope Francis said on board the papal flight to Armenia that "the will expressed by the people...requires a great responsibility on the part of all of us to guarantee the good of the people of the United Kingdom as well as the peaceful coexistence of the entire European continent. This is what I expect."
- Iceland: Outgoing President Ólafur Ragnar Grímsson welcomed the result as good news for Icelanders and presents an opportunity for Iceland. He commented that “it is now obvious that here in the North Atlantic [there] will be a triangle of nations that all stand outside of the European Union: Greenland, Iceland, Great Britain, Faroe Islands and Norway. This key area in the north will be outside of the influence of the European Union." The Presidential candidate Guðni Th. Jóhannesson said on the day after the vote, as well as the day before the Icelandic vote, in the final debate that the result in the UK changes "much for the better for us Icelanders," implying the European Economic Area agreement that non-EU members Norway and Iceland have with the EU, could play a more important role with the United Kingdom on board.
- India: Finance Minister Arun Jaitley said: "In this globalised world, volatility and uncertainty are the new norms. This verdict will obviously further contribute to such volatility not least because its full implications for the UK, Europe and the rest of the world are still uncertain. All countries around the world will have to brace themselves for a period of possible turbulence while being watchful about, and alert to, the referendum's medium term impacts." Commerce Secretary Rita Teaotia said: "My interest will get changed because number of tariff lines (products) will change (now). I will calibrate and the EU will also calibrate. Now they would reassess and we will also be going to reassess." She added that recalibration is required as some items of interest to Britain may have to be removed. She further noted: "Brexit will not impact our trade with the UK. With EU also, nothing directly affects our trade. In long term, we would be interested to see how UK negotiates its exit from EU." In regards to a proposed free-trade agreement Commerce and Industry Minister Nirmala Sitharaman said: "I would think, they (EU) would need time now to assimilate this outcome. Once they assimilate the outcome, they will only then respond. I will talk to my counterparts." She added: "So the impact of volatility of the currency is something which might have an immediate impact on our exporters. We will however have to keep watching currency based volatility, both in the short and the medium term and also look at the impact on overall trade itself." External Affairs Ministry Spokesperson Vikas Swarup said: "We have seen the results of the British referendum on EU membership reflecting the choice made by the British people on the issue. We value our multifaceted relationships with both the UK and the EU and will strive to further strengthen these ties in the years ahead." CII Director-General, Chandrajit Bannerjee said, “With Britain’s departure from the EU, India will have to negotiate a Free Trade Agreement with the UK which may be easier to accomplish at a bilateral level... This could well be the best era for our industries to collaborate.”
- Iran: The Foreign Ministry issued a statement that read: "The Islamic Republic of Iran, as a democratic state, are [sic] respected to British vote to leave the European Union and considered it as will of the majority of its people in setting its foreign relations. Iran has always called for expansion of relations with European countries based on mutual respect and non-interference in each other's internal affairs and the withdrawal of Great Britain from the European Union will not change [the] Islamic Republic's relations with that country."
- Israel: Prime Minister of Israel Benjamin Netanyahu quickly issued a statement following the result of the vote and said that he has been in contact with officials from the Finance Ministry and Bank of Israel to discuss the possible implications of Brexit on Israel. He has concluded that "there is no direct effect on Israel, apart from the fact that we are part of the global economy" and described outgoing Prime Minister David Cameron as "a respected leader and a true friend of Israel and the Jewish people." following his resignation.
- Japan: Foreign Minister Fumio Kishida issued a statement that read the country would closely observe the impact of developments on Japan and the international community. He added that the government would continue its efforts to maintain and strengthen Japan-United Kingdom relations. Finance Minister Taro Aso said he would carefully monitoring financial market developments and respond as and when needed in the currency markets. Deputy Chief Cabinet Secretary Hiroshige Seko said the government was worried about financial market volatility as a result of the vote as being "undesirable."
- Jordan: The Jordanian Cabinet announced that it would investigate the possible impact of the vote on the Hashemite Kingdom. It has given the Deputy Prime Minister for Economic Affairs and Minister of Industry, Trade and Supply Jawad Ananithe task of preparing a comprehensive report on the repercussions of Brexit, especially because Jordan has "solid relations with the UK on a bilateral level and previously on EU level."
- Norway: Prime Minister Erna Solberg said: "The referendum in the UK marks a crossroads for European cooperation. Britain's decision pose[s] policy challenges. Europe's leaders must get a grasp on the instability and lack of confidence many voters feel." The Centre Party MP Per Olaf Lundteigen also said: "The Centre Party must work even more powerfully to terminate the EEA agreement and replace it with a trade agreement." The No to EU organisation, in a statement, welcomed the result as a "victory for democracy" and invited the UK to rejoin EFTA.
- Macedonia: President Gjorge Ivanov said that he fears that the European Union may follow the former Yugoslavia’s steps. "In circumstances of a crisis, countries are becoming selfish, right wing radicals are emerging who are blaming refugees and Muslims and Islamophobia is emerging," Ivanov said, adding that the Republic of Macedonia will carefully follow the developments after the referendum, where 52 per cent of the British people voted in favour of leaving the EU. Foreign Minister Nikola Popovski also said that Brexit means a loss for the Balkans and the Republic of Macedonia, because Britain was a great supporter of the process of the enlargement of the Union.
- Malaysia: Prime Minister Najib Razak said: "The UK voters have spoken. As democrats, we must respect the result. We wish our British friends well in the new future they have chosen, Najib also hinted it was "historic and unprecedented. The future cannot be predicted, although a period of volatility in financial markets is to be expected as the ramifications of the result are understood and as Britain's exit is negotiated."
- Mexico: President Enrique Peña Nieto called for greater NAFTA integration with Canada and the United States in the wake of the result.
- Moldova: Prime Minister Pavel Filip said "A sad day for Europe and for European and international friends of Great Britain. The European edifice needs reconfirmation more than ever. Moldova remains attached to its European course despite the results of the referendum in the UK because we consider the EU a successful project and we want to be part of it, based on reforms, during the next years."
- New Zealand: Foreign Minister Murray McCully stated "We've simply made an offer that we as a country that is a long-standing friend ... stands ready to be useful in any way we can be," The Foreign Minister did not rule out providing the UK with the expertise of its trade negotiators. While Todd McClay, the Trade Minister for New Zealand, said that loaning staff was not "currency on the table given the range of trade negotiation commitments New Zealand is currently managing". However, McCully said that his colleague's comments were no contradiction, and that Wellington would "wait and see" on the issue of loaning staff. "We will obviously look at what they ask us for and whether we have it."
- Oman: The Foreign Ministry issued a statement that praised the "brave and historic decision to leave the EU, explained by some as a firm reaction to certain policies of the European Commission."
- Qatar: Qatar has also reiterated its strong relationship with the UK, in a tweet by the Qatari Ambassador to Britain, Yousef Al-Khater.
- Russian Federation: President Vladimir Putin stated: "The consequences will be global, they are inevitable; they will be both positive and negative...It is a choice of the British people. We did not interfere and we are not going to interfere." The head of the Federation Council's Foreign Affairs Committee Konstantin Kosachyov stated that the EU "has not solved its main problem: to become understood by and convenient for the broader masses of the population. [However,] this is an issue for the E.U. foremost to draw conclusions from, and Britain only second."
- Singapore: Prime Minister Lee Hsien Loong said in a statement "Other developed countries also face similar challenges as Britain. We all live in a globalised, interdependent world. The desire to disengage, to be less constrained by one's partners, to be free to do things entirely as one chooses, is entirely understandable. And yet in reality for many countries, disengaging and turning inwards will likely lead to less security, less prosperity, and a dimmer future. Singapore will continue to cultivate our ties with Britain, which is a long standing friend and partner."
- South Africa: President Jacob Zuma issued a statement saying, "It will take two years for the institutional changes that this vote implies to be negotiated and we remain committed to retaining strong trade and financial relations with both Britain and the European Union."
- South Korea: Yonhap reported South Korea's economic and financial authorities held an emergency meeting to discuss ways to fend off any possible fallout from the British withdrawal from the European Union.
- Switzerland: President Johann Schneider-Ammann said in the capital, Bern, that the UK plebiscite raised "many questions" for Great Britain, Switzerland, the EU and Europe as a whole. "The European concept," he warned, "must be reconsidered", a veiled reference to ongoing discussions in Brussels as to whether EU members would benefit or not from ever-closer political, fiscal, and economic union.
- Syria: President Bashar al-Assad scorned British politicians for allowing the vote on leaving the European Union, saying lawmakers who had criticised his handling of the civil war had shown themselves to be "disconnected from reality".
- Sudan: Spokesman of the Ministry of Foreign Affairs Ambassador Ali Al-Saddiq said the result was indicative of the will of the British people and that "Britain's exit from the European Union is not expected to affect its relations with Sudan." He added that both countries had "expressed their keenness, more than once, to return the bilateral relations between them to the normal course...Sudan is confident that if there is the political will at the British side, it (Sudan) is keen to enhance and upgrade its relations with Britain especially that Britain has colonised Sudan in the past, and therefore it is more aware than the other western countries about Sudan and the Sudanese people."
- Thailand: General and Prime Minister Prayut Chan-o-cha has said that, unlike David Cameron, he will remain in power even if the August referendum rejects the constitution his administration has had drafted. Meanwhile, a trade official has confirmed that Brexit will not affect this country because the EU froze all trade negotiations with Thailand a long time ago. while Chan-o-cha went on to tell the media at Government House that he will not leave his position even if the draft charter is turned down in the August referendum, adding that the ways he and David Cameron came to power are different, Matichon Online reported.
- The Bahamas: Foreign Affairs Minister Fred Mitchell said yesterday while there will "likely" be an impact for The Bahamas and the Caribbean of Britain’s vote to exit the European Union, it is "too early to say" what that impact will be.
- Turkey: President Recep Tayyip Erdoğan, has hailed Britain's departure as the "beginning of a new era" saying that the EU could face further break-up if it does not reconsider its stance towards Turkey. On the 24 June, he blasted the EU's attitude towards Turkey as "Islamophobic". He also criticised David Cameron for his stance on Turkey during his 'Remain' campaign, when he said Turkey was unlikely to enter the EU ‘until the year '3000'. Also Prime Minister Binali Yıldırım said "The EU should read this development very well and reassess its future vision." While Deputy Prime Minister Nurettin Canikli said: "The period of the disintegration of the European Union has begun. And the first vessel to have departed is Britain."
- Ukraine: Following a meeting with Moldovan Deputy Prime Minister Gheorghe Balan, First Deputy Chairman of the Verkhovna Rada Iryna Herashchenko wrote: "Ukraine and Moldova are disappointed by the referendum results and concerned about the growing number of eurosceptics in the European Union, however, Ukraine and Moldova are committed to the course of the European integration and reforms." On 1 July 2016, Prime Minister Volodymyr Groysman criticised the British people for voting to leave the EU, but said that it was a positive signal that many young people voted to remain in the EU, adding that he was convinced that Ukraine would join the EU within the next decade.
- United States: President Barack Obama stated that he respects the decision made by the people of the UK, despite not supporting the country leaving the EU. Then-Republican presumptive nominee for president Donald Trump said, after arriving in Scotland: "I think it's a great thing. I think it's a fantastic thing."

=== Other ===
- Kosovo: European Integration Minister, Bekim Collaku, said it was "painful that one of the member countries, one of the first to recognize our independence and among the most supportive in our European path, will leave the EU." He added that Kosovo still had a "powerful aspiration for EU membership."
- Taiwan: Premier Lin Chuan said the UK and EU may expand their economic and trade relations with Asia and the current international financial markets could show more interest in investing in Taiwan. "The MOEA must devise related approaches to encourage investment in Taiwan should any opportunity arise." He added that the UK should reposition and renegotiate its relations with all its global trading partners. "Taiwan must be prepared has to cope with the new situation." In regards to Chuan's weekly meeting with the heads Taiwanese ministries and other unnamed central government agencies, Cabinet Spokesman Tung Chen-yuan said on 27 June: "With crisis comes opportunity that Taiwan must be able to recognize and grasp."

== Economic ==
The Euro declined in value by almost four percent against the United States dollar, while traditional "safe haven assets" such as gold and the Japanese Yen increased in value. Crude oil prices fell. The flagship French CAC 40 and German DAX initially fell by over 10% upon opening, while bank shares from the two countries fell by more. Likewise, the Spanish IBEX 35, Greek ATHEX, Dutch AEX index, Czech PX Index and Polish WIG30 all fell by eight to 15 percent. The Swiss franc, a traditional save haven asset, rose sharply, thus prompting the Swiss National Bank to intervene in the foreign exchange market to cap the rise. It issues a statement that read: "Following the United Kingdom's vote to leave the European Union, the Swiss franc came under upward pressure. The Swiss National Bank has intervened in the foreign exchange market to stabilise the situation and will remain active in that market". Yields on European sovereign bonds spiked, with 10-year bonds in Spain and Italy rose as much as 0.40% in early trades. Sweden's Riksbank issued a statement that read it was "following the financial market developments closely and has a continuing dialogue with other authorities. We have contacts with the Swedish banks and other central banks. We are ready to take the necessary actions to handle financial market distortions."

In the Asian-Pacific region, markets also fell. Meanwhile, an unnamed official at the Bank of Korea in South Korea declined to comment on rumours it intervened in the foreign exchange market, but Vice Finance Minister Choi Sang-Mok said the government would take all efforts to minimise the impact of the result. An unnamed policymaker with knowledge of the Reserve Bank of India's (RBI) plans for related market management said that it was "prepared to deal with any volatility." Unnamed officials at SEBI said that they were in touch with the RBI on the market developments amid surveillance being beefed up to curb excess volatility and possible manipulations in various trading segments, including currency derivatives. The Australian dollar, which has traditionally been sold off in times of financial market uncertainty, fell strongly against the dollar and the yen. Other traditional markers of uncertainty, such as interbank dollar funding rates in Singapore and Hong Kong, were more steady. Hong Kong Financial Secretary John Tsang said: "Because of this matter, we have made preparation in many aspects. We have reserved sufficient liquidity and we are able to handle in different situations." The Hong Kong Monetary Authority asked banks within its jurisdiction to maintain ample cash conditions and that no unscheduled monetary liquidity injection operations had been taken. The Singapore Exchange sought to reduce volatility by raising margins on Nikkei futures traded on its exchange. The Chinese yuan fell to its weakest level against the US dollar since January 2011 while its offshore counterpart slipped to its weakest level in more than four months, despite a possibly unrelated People's Bank of China injection of 170 billion yuan into the system. The Philippines Central Bank issued a statement that read it was closely monitoring the foreign exchange market and would be prepared to act to ensure orderly transactions and smooth volatility.

In the USA, government bonds effectively priced in a small Federal Open Market Committee interest rate cut from a rate increase in July. When American markets opened there was a dramatic fall from Canada to Brazil.

Every two months, a conclave of many major central bank governors is held in Basel, Switzerland at the BIS. This month the meeting coincided with the day following the vote. RBI's Raghuram Rajan, who had previously called for greater co-ordination for such situations, issued a statement that sought to allay concerns about the impact of the vote on Indian financial markets and reiterated the RBI's promise to provide necessary liquidity support to ensure orderly movements. He also sought to reassure investors about India's preparedness to deal with the eventuality and that the Indian rupee's fall was relatively moderate compared to many other currencies.

=== Business ===
Anton Boerner, head of Germany's foreign trade association, said: "That is a catastrophic result for Britain and also for Europe and Germany, especially the German economy. It is disturbing that the oldest democracy in the world turns its back on us." Europe's airport trade body, ACI Europe called for the European Union and United Kingdom aviation markets to remain integrated in the future by safeguarding air connectivity and continuing to support economic development.

In India, Biocon Chief Managing Director Kiran Mazumdar-Shaw said: "It has opened up a Pandora's box of grave uncertainties. Will Euro [sic] remain intact or will we see others exit? What will be the impact on the Euro itself? Will it devalue and to what extent? How will India's bilateral trade with UK and Europe be impacted? How much will the USD strengthen against the Pound Sterling/Euro/Rupee?" She added that "India cannot be in denial that it will be immune to such a result and that there is likely to be mayhem for several weeks before things stabilise. It's fortunate that we still have Raghuram Rajan at the helm of RBI at this critical time." India's Nasscom President R. Chandrashekhar said: "The impact of Brexit will certainly be negative in the short-term on account of volatility in the exchange rates, uncertainty in the markets and the terms on which Britain will leave the EU." Chief Investment Officer for TD Asset Management said that investors are wondering if the result could lead to a slowdown in the global economy. Tata Group, whose Tata Steel was involved in controversy following the decision to shut down their Port Talbot Welsh steel mill, amongst other layoffs, were suggested to be the hardest hit on the Indian financial markets. An unnamed company spokesman said that access to markets and a skilled workforce were "important considerations;" he added that "there are 19 independent Tata companies in the UK, with diverse businesses. Each company continuously reviews its strategy and operations in the light of developments, and will continue to do so." Tata Motors', whose portfolio includes the British based Jaguar Cars and Land Rover, shares sank the day of the announcement. An unnamed division spokesman said: "We remain absolutely committed to our customers in the EU. There will be a significant negotiating period and we look forward to understanding more about that as details emerge."

Singapore's United Overseas Bank issued a statement that read: "We will temporarily stop receiving foreign property loan applications for London properties. As the aftermath of the UK referendum is still unfolding and given the uncertainties, we need to ensure our customers are cautious with their London property investments. We are monitoring the market environment closely and will assess regularly to determine when we will re-instate our London property loan offering."

== Media ==
The BBC, the British national broadcaster, highlighted uncertain reactions from the EU, Ireland and Greece. characterising Britain's plan to leave the European Union as "utter disruption" that could result in a "domino effect." North Korea's Rodong Sinmun wrote an editorial that called the result as "causing problems." Sweden's Dagens Nyheter and Dagens Industri questioned the decision to hold a referendum. The latter's political editor P. M. Nilsson wrote, in an editorial, that "democracy is greater than the power of the people...[the result clearly showed that] the democratic aspirations of the international cooperation such as the EU should be reduced. At present, the key question should not be how people could get more power from the EU, but rather how to protect the EU, together with its member states, from such expressions of people's power."

== Academia ==
In the article "Britain's Democratic Failure", Professor Kenneth Rogoff of Harvard University wrote "This isn’t democracy; it is Russian roulette for republics. A decision of enormous consequence ... has been made without any appropriate checks and balances ... The idea that somehow any decision reached anytime by majority rule is necessarily “democratic” is a perversion of the term. Modern democracies have evolved systems of checks and balances to protect the interests of minorities and to avoid making uninformed decisions with catastrophic consequences."

Professor Michael Dougan of Liverpool University and Jean Monnet Chair of EU Law said "On virtually every major issue that was raised in this referendum debate Leave’s arguments consisted of at best misrepresentations and at worst outright deception" and that the Leave campaign was "criminally irresponsible".

Khaled al-Hroub, a senior research fellow at the Faculty of Asian and Middle Eastern Studies at the University of Cambridge said: "In theory, the UK's influence on the EU policies vis-à-vis Arab issues such as Palestine, Syria and Iraq will end - which is not necessarily a bad thing to have. The British used to pull the EU in the direction of more Americanised positions and politics. Relieving the EU from British pressure could be seen as a good sign that allows for more independent European standing on Arab affairs."

== Religious ==
- Anglican Communion - Archbishops Justin Welby of Canterbury and John Sentamu of York issued a joint statement that read citizens must "re-imagine both what it means to be the United Kingdom in an interdependent world and what values and virtues should shape and guide our relationships with others."
- Roman Catholicism:
  - Commission of the Bishops' Conferences of the European Community - The conference marked the outcome by displaying a "Prayer for Europe" on its website, which invoked God’s help "in committing ourselves to a Europe of the Spirit, founded not just on economic treaties but also on values which are human and eternal."
  - Polish Episcopal Conference - Archbishop Stanisław Gądecki of Poznan told the country’s Roman Catholic information agency, KAI, that while the conference respects the voters’ decision "we can’t forget unity is better than division, and that European solidarity is an achievement of many generations."
  - Archbishop Jean-Pierre Grallet of Strasbourg said he was left with "feelings of sadness [that] what we have long fought for has been contradicted. [I hope] the vote would create a clarification [rather than] destabilising the European project. I’ve repeatedly said we should work for a future which is more European than national, but on condition this Europe is an entity we can identify with."
- Church of Scotland - Rev Dr Richard Frazer, the Convener of the Church and Society Council, stated that "the Church of Scotland has spoken out consistently over the last 20 years in favour of our continued membership to the European Union – but it [Brexit] is the democratic decision of people living in the UK and we must honour that."

== Individuals ==
Former politicians

Former Czech President Václav Klaus said the result was a victory for democrats who want to live in a free world and it would change the thinking of millions of people in Europe. He compared the result to the British resistance against Napoleon Bonaparte and Adolf Hitler. He also stated that it would not have any economic effect on the Czech Republic. Former Australian Prime Minister Tony Abbott commented that "a brave and momentous decision by the British people taken against the advice of foreigners (including me!). There will be more chance of an Oz FTA (Free Trade Agreement) with Britain than with the EU."
