= European Security and Defence College =

European Union body

- Abbreviation: ESDC
- Formation: 2005; 21 years ago
- Type: European Union body
- Headquarters: Brussels, Belgium
- Region served: European Union and associated countries
- Head: Fergal Ó Regan
- Staff: Approximately 25
- Website: esdc.europa.eu

The European Security and Defence College (ESDC) is an autonomous European Union (EU) body under the overall responsibility of the HR/VP, that provides training and education at EU level in the field of the Common Security and Defence Policy (CSDP), which is part of the EU's Common Foreign and Security Policy (CFSP).

== Mission ==
In line with the Council Decision (CFSP) 2024/3116 of 9 December 2024 on the European Security and Defence College and repealing Decision (CFSP) 2020/1515, the ESDC shall provide training and education in the field of the Union's Common Security and Defence Policy (CSDP) in the wider context of the Common Foreign and Security Policy (CFSP) at European level, in order to develop and promote a common understanding of CSDP and CFSP among civilian and military personnel, and to identify and disseminate best practice in relation to various CSDP and CFSP issues through its training and education activities.

== History ==
Under the auspices of the Greek Presidency in 2002 and at the initiative of France and Germany, the concept of 'common training' was introduced. The idea behind this was to develop a European security culture by providing equipped personnel both in the EU Member States and within the EU institutions.

The ESDC was created in 2005 by decision of the Council of the EU.

In 2008 the Military Erasmus programme was introduced. The college marked its twentieth anniversary in 2025.

== Organisation ==
The ESDC is organised as follows:

- Head of the ESDC, responsible for the financial and administrative management of the ESDC;
- ESDC Secretariat, responsible for supporting the Head of the ESDC in fulfilling his tasks.
- Steering Committee, responsible for ESDC training activities;
- Executive Academic Board, responsible for ensuring the quality and coherence of ESDC training activities via initiatives such as Military Erasmus, eLearning, the task force on CSDP missions and operations training, and the Doctoral School;

The college is currently composed of around 270 national training institutes, including national defence academies, police colleges, diplomatic training institutes, the European Union Institute for Security Studies, the European Defence Agency and other educational and academic institutions.

The ESDC develops numerous training activities, mostly with a regional or horizontal focus, ranging from newcomer courses up to strategic leadership level courses such as the CSDP High Level Course.

=== Military Erasmus ===
The ESDC's Military Erasmus programme, formally the European initiative for the exchange of young officers, aims to instil a common security and defence culture in young European officers and thereby amplifying interoperability between armed forces. This programme is modelled on its civilian counterpart, Erasmus+.

== See also ==
- European Union Institute for Security Studies
- Finabel
- Joint European Union Intelligence School
- Military Erasmus
- NATO Defense College
- NATO School
