= Intelligence College in Europe =

European intergovernmental entity for intelligence communities in Paris

Intelligence College in Europe (ICE)
- Collège du Renseignement en Europe
- Established: 5 March 2019; 7 years ago
- Headquarters: École Militaire, Paris, France
- Website: www.intelligence-college-europe.org

The Intelligence College in Europe (ICE; French: Collège du Renseignement en Europe) is an intergovernmental entity, independent of the European Union (EU) institutions, inaugurated in 2019 in Paris. ICE aims to bring together all the intelligence communities (civilian, military, internal, external and technical services) of European countries, national and European decision-makers as well as the academic world in order to stimulate strategic thinking and thus develop a common intelligence culture.

== History ==
In his speech on the future of Europe delivered on 27 September 2017 at the Sorbonne, the President of the French Republic, Emmanuel Macron, proposed the creation of a "European Intelligence Academy", which would serve as a crucible for the emergence of a common strategic culture.

In particular, he stated:

"What Europe lacks most today, this Europe of Defence, is a common strategic culture. [...] We do not have the same cultures, whether they be parliamentary, historical or political, nor do we have the same sensitivities. And we will not change that in a day. But I propose right now to try to build this culture together, by proposing a European initiative [...] aimed at developing this shared strategic culture. [...] I would therefore like to see the establishment of a European Intelligence Academy to strengthen the links between our countries through training and exchange activities."

Macron would rename this initiative "Intelligence College in Europe" on the occasion of the inaugural event in Paris on 5 March 2019. This meeting brought together high-level representatives of sixty-six intelligence services from thirty European countries. The thirty countries were the 27 EU member states as well as Norway, the United Kingdom and Switzerland.

In February 2020, twenty-three states met in Zagreb to sign the letter of intent, which formalises and perpetuates the existence of the Intelligence College in Europe, setting out a governance framework. These 23 states are Austria, Belgium, Croatia, Cyprus, the Czech Republic, Denmark, Estonia, Finland, France, Germany, Hungary, Italy, Latvia, Lithuania, Malta, the Netherlands, Norway, Portugal, Romania, Slovenia, Spain, Sweden, and the United Kingdom.

Out of the 30 countries initially meeting in Paris on 5 March 2019, seven of them chose to have a partner status, which is less restrictive but still allows them to participate in certain activities: Bulgaria, Greece, Ireland, Luxembourg, Poland, Slovakia, and Switzerland. These countries may eventually become members of the college by signing the Letter of Intent.

Since 2023, Bulgaria and Switzerland have joined the college as a full members.In 2024, Greece joined the College as a full member. During 2025, Slovakia and Luxembourg also joined.

== Organisation ==
The Intelligence College Europe operates on a three-tier organisation, comprising:

- the Steering Committee – a decision-making body representing the member countries,
- the Presidency – held by one country in annual rotation and assisted by a Troika comprising both previous and future presidencies,
- the Permanent Secretariat – responsible for the implementation of decisions, based at the École Militaire in Paris

List of the Presidencies of the Intelligence College in Europe:

- Croatia - Statement by Director General of SOA, Mr. Daniel Markić (2020),
- United Kingdom - Declaration of Mrs. Beth Sizeland (2021),
- Italy - Message of Ambassador Elisabetta Belloni (2022),
- Romania - Message of Professor Adrian Ivan (2023).
- Spain - Letter from the Secretary of State Esperanza Casteleiro, Directora of the CNI (2024)
- Norway - Letter from Deputy Director General Kristin Hemmer Mørkestøl (2025)
- Germany - Letter from Philipp Wolff, Coordinator of the Federal Intelligence services and Head of Directorate-General 7, Federal Chancellery (2026)

List of the directors of the Permanent Secretariat:

- Yasmine Gouédard (2020–2022)
- François Fischer (since 2022)

== Missions ==
The Intelligence College in Europe aims at stimulating strategic thinking, thus developing a common intelligence culture by:

- promoting the sharing of experience and professional cultures;
- raising awareness of intelligence issues;
- building bridges between academia, intelligence communities and the civil society.

== Activities ==
The college proposes three types of activities, organised by member countries:

- Thematic Seminars and webinars
- Outreach sessions
- Academic Programme.

To pursue these activities, ICE is supported by a dedicated Academic Network. The first ICE Academic Conference took place in Bucharest on 4 May 2023. The second Academic Network Conference was held at the University of Salamanca on 4–5 June 2024. The next ICE Academic Conference is scheduled to take place in Munich on 17–19 June 2026.

== Related items ==
- National Centre for Counter Terrorism
- Joint European Union Intelligence School
- European Union Institute for Security Studies
- European Centre of Excellence for Countering Hybrid Threats

== Literature ==
- Uwe M. Borghoff, Lars Berger and François Fischer (2023), The Intelligence College in Europe (ICE): An Effort to Create a European Intelligence Community, arXiv:2312.17107
- Lars Berger, Uwe M. Borghoff, Gerhard Conrad and Stefan Pickl (2024), Intelligence Education made in Europe, arXiv:2404.12125
