= NATO Defense College =

International military college

Coordinates: 41.807°N 12.491°E

- Motto: Unitatem alentes (Latin)
- Motto in English: Unity of the warring
- Established: November 1951, 19; 74 years ago
- Location: Rome, Italy
- Website: ndc.nato.int

NATO Defense College (NDC) is the international military college for North Atlantic Treaty Organization countries. It is located in Rome, Italy.

== History ==
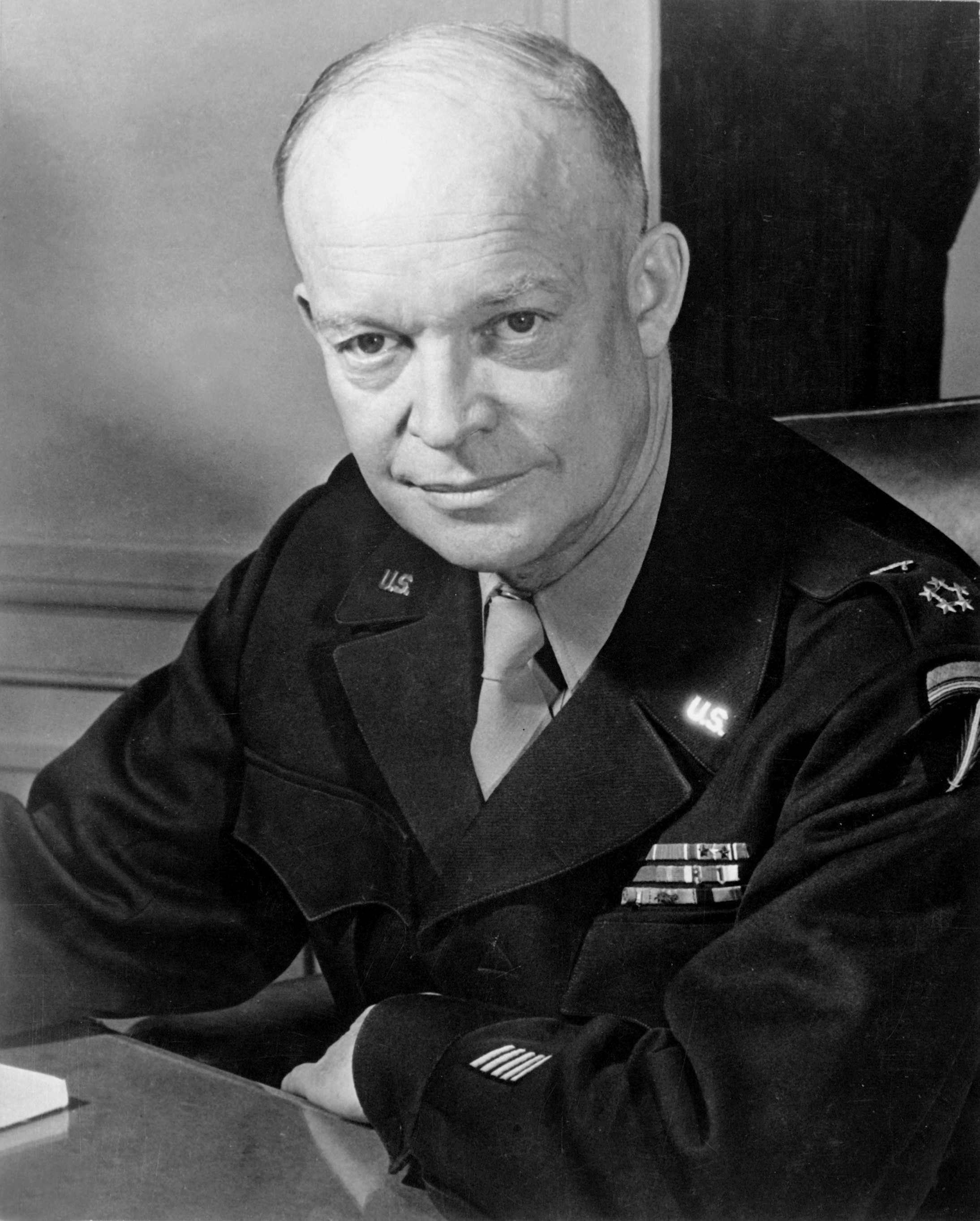
General Dwight D. Eisenhower

The idea of a NATO Defense College originated with General Dwight D. Eisenhower, the first Supreme Allied Commander Europe (SACEUR), who identified very early on the need for a new international institution with a unique education mission. On 19 November 1951, the NATO Defense College opened its doors to Course 1 in Paris. In 1966, France withdrew from the Alliance's integrated military structure and the College moved to the EUR quartier of Rome.

On 10 September 1999, the new College building, twice the size of the old one, was inaugurated in Cecchignola Città Militare, a military zone 2 km from the former site. On 13–14 October 2016, the NATO Defense College celebrated the 50th anniversary of its move to Rome and the 65th anniversary of its foundation.

== Mission ==
Based on Strategic Guidance issued to the NDC by the North Atlantic Council and the NATO Military Committee (MC123/8), the NDC's stated mission is to:

- Contribute to effectiveness and cohesion of the alliance
- Foster strategic level thinking on political and military matters
- Develop a major center of education, study, and research:
  - Prepare selected officers and officials for important NATO and NATO-related multinational appointments
  - Conduct academic studies and research in support of the alliance's wider goals
  - Support an active outreach programme with other educational institutions

There is a high priority requirement to develop individuals, both on the military and on the civilian side, who will have a thorough grasp of the many complicated factors which are involved in the problem of creating an adequate defense posture for the North Atlantic Treaty area. These considerations have brought me to the conclusion that it is highly desirable to establish in the near future a NATO Defense College for the training of individuals who will be needed to serve in key capacities in NATO Organizations.

— General Dwight D. Eisenhower

== Organization ==
The commandant is an officer with the rank of Lieutenant-General. In July 2023, Lieutenant-General Max Arthur Lund Thorsø Nielsen of the Royal Danish Air Force assumed command.

The college is organized into four main divisions that perform education and research tasks coordinated by the dean (civilian equivalent of a 2-star general) of the college.

The divisions work closely together to provide breadth, flexibility and quality of high-level strategic education.

The Director of Enablement (a Brigadier General) supervises management of the NDC's financial and technical resources with the aim of improving the quality of life in the college and creating the best conditions for work and study.

== Core business ==
=== Education ===
Six regular courses are held at the college:

- The Senior Course: The most important course at the NDC. It lasts 5½ months and runs twice a year. Some 15 weeks are spent in the college, with the rest of the time on field studies. There is a 2-3 day crisis management exercise at the end of the course. The course is open to officers (Colonels, Lieutenant Colonels) and civilian officials and diplomats (of equivalent rank). Over 200 attend each year (approximately 25% civilian). The senior course is open not only to NATO nations but also to Partnership for Peace-Mediterranean Dialogue-Istanbul Cooperation Initiative nations, Contact Countries and Iraq.
- Generals, Flag Officers & Ambassadors' Course (GFOAC): This course seeks to enhance mutual understanding of security concerns and of NATO's interests and capabilities among Generals and Flag Officers and high-ranking civilians including ambassadors from NATO, PfP, Med Dialogue and ICI nations, Contact Countries & Iraq. It also provides opportunities for networking among one- to three-star officers and civilians of equivalent rank.
- NATO Regional Cooperation Course (NRCC): Commissioned by the North Atlantic Council at the Riga summit in 2006, after two years of preparation the NRCC was inaugurated at the College in 2009 to link issues of concern to both MD and ICI Nations and NATO, and to develop mutual understanding and networking among participants. It shares lecturers with the Senior Course (40% of the time), and also has its own separate facilities and lecturers, mostly from the ME region, and its own Faculty Advisors and staff. The NRCC offers a ten-week academic programme twice each year.
- Modular Short Courses (MSCs): The NDC offers five MSCs during every Senior Course for the duration 5 days. This is an opportunity for military officers and civilian officials who may not be able to attend the NDC for a six-month period. Each MSC is designed to both inform and stimulate the participants by providing the opportunity to improve their knowledge and develop their understanding of some of the key political, economic, socio-cultural, defence and security related issues which may have worldwide implications for global and Alliance security.
- Senior Executive Regional Conference (SERC): This week-long conference is dedicated to a select, high-profile group of diplomats, senior officials, high-ranking officers, policy planners and researchers, from NATO member states as well as from the Alliance's partner countries in the Gulf and Mediterranean area. Participants successfully engaged in an intensive week of study, dialogue and open discussion on the strategic issues which are currently of particular relevance to the security of the countries represented.
- Integrated Partner Orientation Course (IPOC): The aim of the Integrated Partner Orientation Course (IPOC) is to improve participants' knowledge of the NATO Alliance; its missions, roles and priorities; its internal structures and organisation; and its external relations with partner nations and international institutions. The course examines the way in which each of these elements is evolving to reflect changes in the international security environment, which is similar to the structure of the NDC Senior Course.

=== Research ===
Research at the NATO Defense College, carried out by the Research Division (RD), provides the NATO's senior leaders with analyses and recommendations on current issues concerning the Alliance. The activities of the RD can help to convey NATO's positions to the wider audience of the international strategic community. The RD performs its tasks mainly through research papers – short academic essays and academic reports, and forum papers – in-depth studies, analyses and reports.

The Research Division published about 20 studies and analyses, about 30 articles in journals (International Herald Tribune, International Affairs, Defense News, Politique Étrangère, Washington Times, etc.), was regularly quoted in the New York Times, Newsweek, Le Figaro and news agencies, etc. The RD also organized 8 conferences and workshops and co-facilitated Reykjavik Conferences on Arctic Security and a Military Committee workshop on the Strategic Concept.

=== Outreach activities ===
The NDC has four main outreach activities:

==== The Conference of Commandants (of Defence Colleges) ====
Which has a dual purpose.

- firstly, to facilitate the exchange of information between those responsible for higher defence education with a view to improving curricula and teaching methods;
- secondly, to promote cooperation in higher defence education between colleges in NATO countries and their counterparts in central and east European and Mediterranean Dialogue countries.

==== Kyiv Week ====
NATO's support for senior military education in Ukraine started with the first "International Week", held in February 2001. Since then a similar course has been running every year involving more than 500 participants at a time. The formal aims of the International Week are:

- to improve knowledge of NATO, its organization and working methods;
- to discuss the challenges facing the Atlantic Alliance and its partners in today's security environment;
- to address key, current issues in the field of international security;
- to demonstrate the importance of a strong partnership between Ukraine and NATO.

==== The Partnership for Peace Consortium of Defense Academies and Security Studies Institutes ====
Was established in 1999 at the Washington Summit as a Consortium of the Willing and founded in the spirit of Partnership for Peace (PfP). By Military Committee direction, the NATO Defense College "is the focal military point of contact within NATO" for the consortium, composed of 300 organizations in 46 countries. The NDC is actively involved in 6 of the 10 working groups.

==== Advanced Distributed Learning ====
ADL's goal is to provide learning systems that are both more effective and more cost-effective. Course members must follow at least one of the three different ADL courses, to ensure that they have all attained the same level of knowledge before embarking on the Senior Course.

The Introduction to NATO (the NATO Defense College is the content provider for this course); European Security and Defence Policy, and RMA - the Revolution in Military Affairs.

== Commandants ==
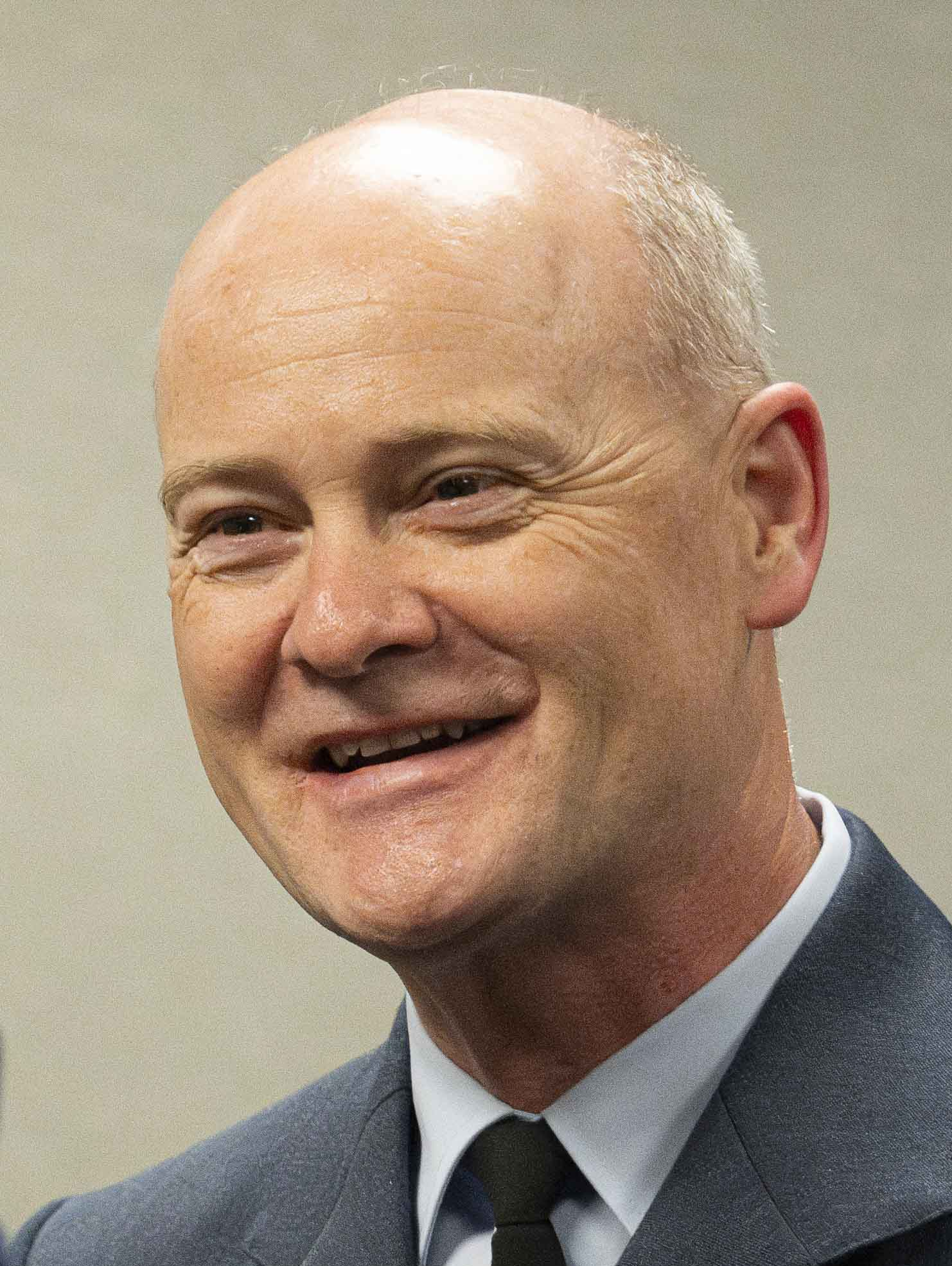
Former commandant, Max Nielsen

The NATO Defense College commandants have been:

- 1951–1953 Admiral André-Georges Lemonnier (French Navy)
- 1953–1955 Air Marshal Sir Lawrence Darvall (Royal Air Force)
- 1955–1957 Lieutenant General Clovis E. Byers (U.S. Army)
- 1957–1958 Lieutenant General E. De Renzi (Italian Army)
- 1958 (Acting Commandant) Major General E.N.K. Estcourt (British Army)
- 1958–1959 Air Lieutenant General Tekin Arıburun (Turkish Air Force)
- 1959–1961 Lieutenant General O. Harteon (Belgian Army)
- 1961–1963 Lieutenant General U. De Martino (Italian Army)
- 1963–1965 Lieutenant General Wolf Graf Von Baudissin (German Army)
- 1965–1966 Lieutenant General D.S. Fanali (Italian Air Force)
- 1966–1968 Lieutenant General E. Tufte Johnsen (Royal Norwegian Air Force)
- 1968–1970 Lieutenant General Şefik Erensü (Turkish Army)
- 1970–1974 Vice Admiral J.E. O'Brien (Royal Canadian Navy)
- 1974–1976 Lieutenant General Eigil Wolff (Danish Army)
- 1976–1979 Lieutenant General R.J.W. Heslinga (Royal Netherlands Army)
- 1979–1981 Vice Admiral Sir Lancelot Bell-Davies (Royal Navy)
- 1981–1984 Lieutenant General J.G. Kotsolakis (Greek Air Force)
- 1984–1987 Lieutenant General F.l.S. Uhle-Wettler (German Army)
- 1987–1989 Lieutenant General A. Everaert (Belgian Army)
- 1989–1993 Lieutenant General P.M.A. Castelo Branco (Portuguese Air Force)
- 1993–1996 Lieutenant General R.J. Evraire (Canadian Army)
- 1996–1999 Lieutenant General Lecea Dezcallar (Spanish Army)
- 1999–2002 Lieutenant General H. Olboeter (German Air Force)
- 2002–2005 Lieutenant General J.P. Raffene (French Army)
- 2005–2008 Lieutenant General M. Vankeirsbilck (Belgian Air Component)
- 2008–2011 Lieutenant General Wolf-Dieter Loeser (German Army)
- 2011–2014 Lieutenant General Arne Bård Dalhaug (Norwegian Army)
- 2014–2016 Major General Janusz Bojarski (Polish Air Force)
- 2016–2020 Lieutenant General Chris Whitecross (Royal Canadian Air Force)
- 2020–2023 Lieutenant General Olivier Rittimann (French Army)
- 2023–2026 Lieutenant General Max Nielsen (Royal Danish Air Force)
- 2026–present Lieutenant General Jérôme Goisque (French Army)

== See also ==
- European Security and Defence College (ESDC)
- Joint European Union Intelligence School (JEIS)
- Military Erasmus
- NATO School
