= Tiilikainen =

Tiilikainen is a Finnish surname. Notable people with the surname include:

- Kim Tiilikainen (born 1975), Finnish tennis player and coach
- Kimmo Tiilikainen (born 1966), Finnish politician
- Paavo Tiilikainen (1923–2007), Finnish politician
- Teija Tiilikainen (born 1964), Finnish political scientist
- Tommi Tiilikainen (born 1987), Finnish volleyball coach and player
