= Club de Berne =

European intelligence sharing alliance

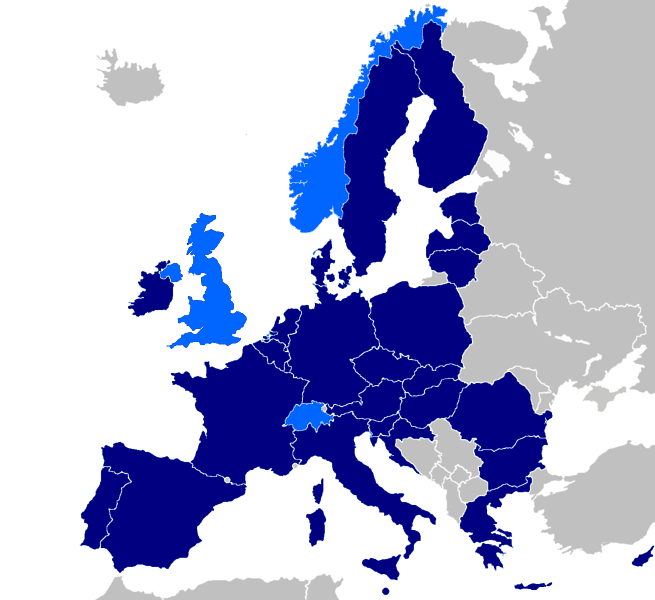
Members of the Counter Terrorism Group (CTG) after the United Kingdom left the European Union as of January 31, 2020

The Club de Berne (French pronunciation: [klœb də bɛʁn], lit. 'Bern Club', CdB) is an intelligence sharing alliance between the intelligence services of the 27 states of the European Union (EU), Norway, the United Kingdom and Switzerland, named after the city of Bern. It is an institution based on voluntary exchange of secrets, experience and views as well as discussing problems. Austria was excluded from the CdB because it permits espionage within its borders as long as the espionage does not target Austria itself, but was re-admitted in 2022. The Club has existed since 1971, has no secretariat, and takes no decisions.

The Counter Terrorism Group (CTG) is an offshoot of the Club and shares terrorism intelligence. It provides threat assessments to EU policy makers and provides a form for expert collaboration. The Group was created after 9/11 to further intelligence sharing cooperation between European intelligence structures. The CTG, like the Club, is outside of the EU's institutions but communicates with them via the participation of the EU Intelligence Analysis Centre (EU INTCEN), a branch of the European External Action Service. Although it is outside the EU, its presidency rotates inline with that of the EU Council presidency and acts as a formal interface between the Club de Berne and the EU.

== Cooperation with Israeli assassination campaign ==
Club activities included a program codenamed "Kilowatt," which entailed aiding the Israeli Mossad's assassination campaign codenamed "Operation Wrath of God" to kill suspected terrorists and other Palestinian activists. European intelligence provided through the Club to Mossad assisted Israeli assassins to find their victims, and official interventions coordinated through the Club allowed Israeli assassins to avoid being detained by local police. "Operation Wrath of God" initially focused on terrorists of the Black September Organization behind the Munich massacre but over the years also included the liaison of the Palestinian Liberation Organization (PLO) to the Soviets and the PLO's representative negotiating a non-aggression pact with the French government.

== See also ==
- Five Eyes
- Joint European Union Intelligence School
