= Teija Tiilikainen =

Finnish political scientist

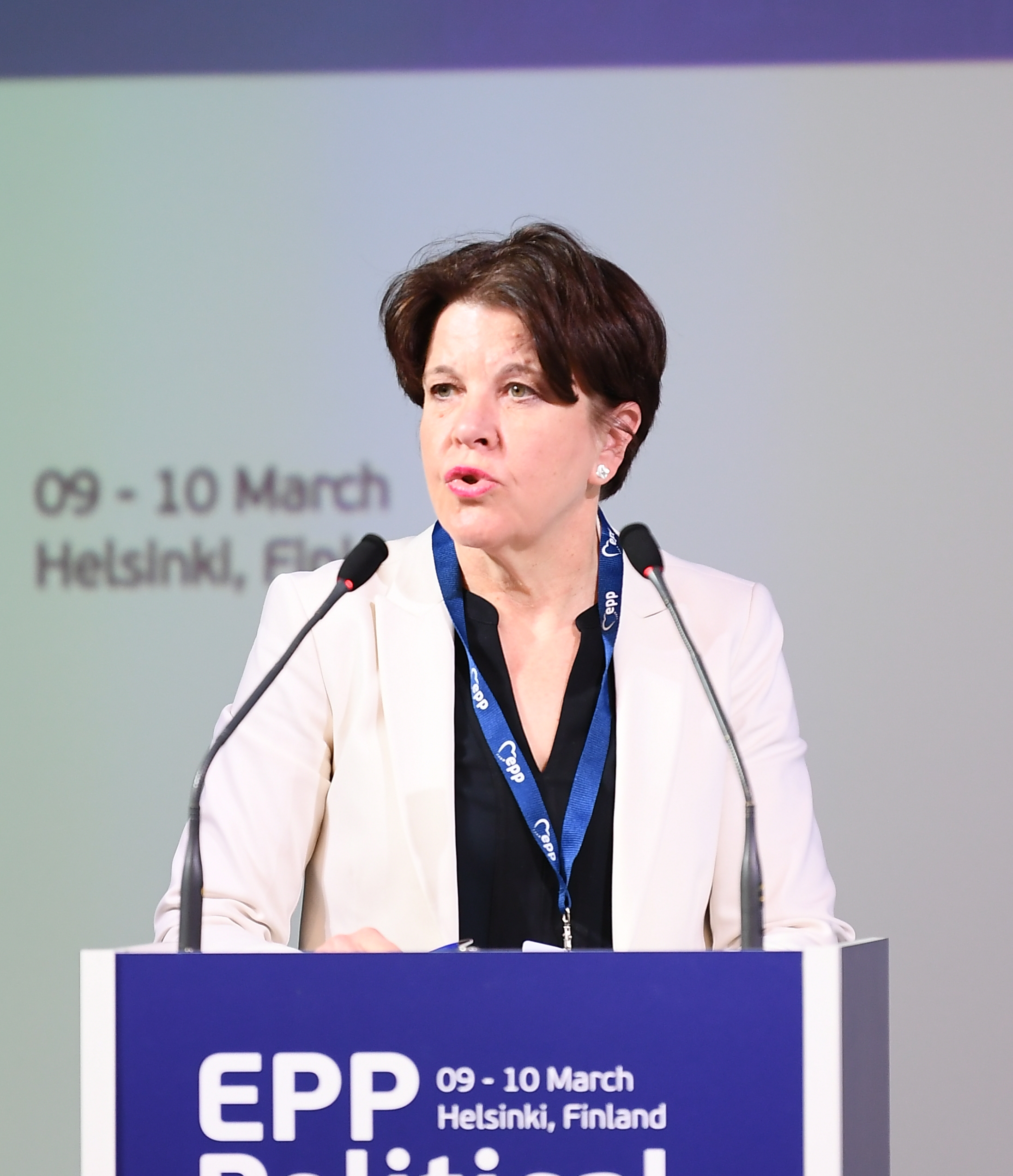
- Teija Tiilikainen in 2023
- Born: 22 April 1964 (age 62); Lohja, Finland
- Education: Åbo Akademi University
- Scientific career
- Fields: Political science
- Workplaces: University of Helsinki; Ministry for Foreign Affairs of Finland; Finnish Institute of International Affairs; Ulkopolitiikka; European Centre of Excellence for Countering Hybrid Threats; School of Transnational Governance

Teija Helena Tiilikainen (born 22 April 1964) is a Finnish political scientist. She has been the Director of the Finnish Institute of International Affairs, Secretary of State at the Ministry for Foreign Affairs of Finland, and a vice-chairperson of the executive board of the University of Helsinki. In August 2019 she was elected Director of the European Centre of Excellence for Countering Hybrid Threats. Her research focuses on European integration and European security policy.

== Early life and career ==
Tiilikainen studied Political Science at Åbo Akademi University. She received a Master in Political Science there in 1989, a graduate diploma in Political Science in 1991, and a doctorate in Political Science in 1997. Her dissertation studied the history of political ideas across Europe and Finland, and the political identity of Finland in Western Europe.

== Career ==
Tiilikainen then joined the faculty at the University of Turku, before returning to the Åbo Akademi University, and then in 1998 moving to the University of Helsinki.

In 2002–2003, Tiilikainen was chosen as a member of the Convention on the Future of Europe. In 2015, she was selected for the Panel of Eminent Persons on European Security, a Common Project by the ambassador Wolfgang Ischinger.

From 2007 to 2008, Tiilikainen was the Secretary of State at the Ministry for Foreign Affairs of Finland. She served in the service of Ilkka Kanerva, and subsequently Alexander Stubb for a short time. In 2009 she returned to the University of Helsinki.

Tiilikainen participated in the Bilderberg meetings of 2002, 2005, and 2007. She has also been the editor-in-chief of the Finnish foreign policy journal Ulkopolitiikka.

From 2003 to 2009, Tiilikainen was Director of the Network of European Studies at the University of Helsinki. In 2010, she left the Network of European Studies when she was appointed to be the Director of the Finnish Institute of International Affairs, which is an independent research institute in Töölö that studies questions of international relations and the European Union. In 2018, she joined the Peace and Security Cluster at the School of Transnational Governance as a part-time professor.

In August 2019, Tiilikainen was elected to a five year term as the director of the European Centre of Excellence for Countering Hybrid Threats, a research centre in Helsinki that studies possible responses to hybrid warfare threats to The European Union and NATO.

Tiilikainen's work has been covered in global news media outlets including Helsingin Sanomat, The Irish Times, The Economist, and The Xinhua News Agency.

== Other activities ==
- European Council on Foreign Relations (ECFR), Member
- European Leadership Network (ELN), Senior Member
