= Sinikukka Saari =

Finnish political scientist

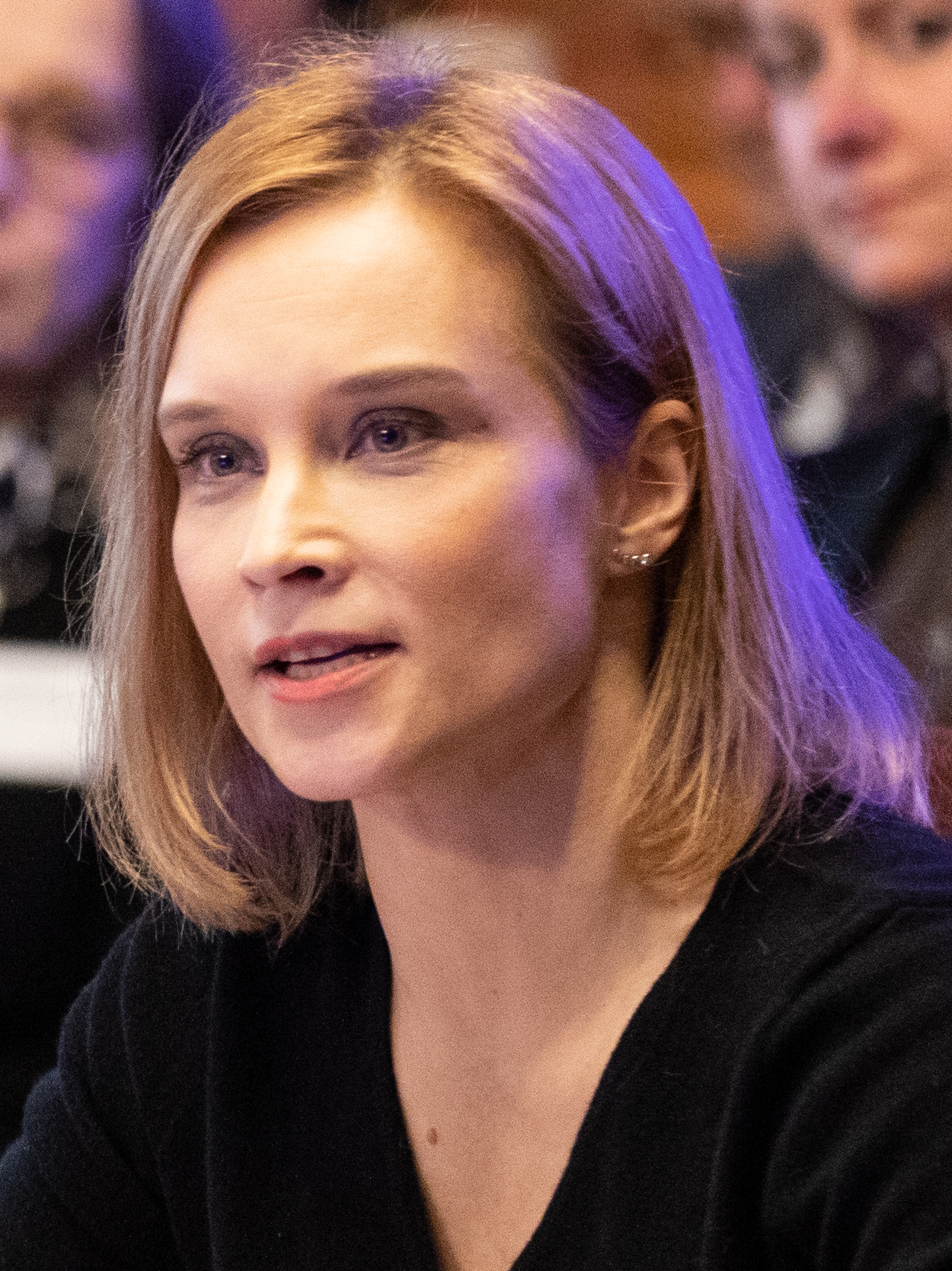
- Saari in 2022
- Born: 1975 (age 50–51)
- Education: PhD in International Relations
- Alma mater: University of Helsinki; The London School of Economics and Political Science
- Relatives: Kirsikka Saari (sister)
- Scientific career
- Fields: Foreign and security policy
- Institutions: FIIA
- Thesis: Form but not the function?' Dilemmas of European human rights and democracy promotion in Russia. (2007)

Sinikukka Saari (born 1975) is a Finnish political scientist in the field of foreign and security policy.

== Career ==
As of 2023, she is working as Research Director at the Finnish Institute of International Affairs (FIIA), specialising in Finland's foreign policy and NATO membership, the geopolitical security situation in northern Europe, and Russia’s foreign policy and its relations with its near environment including the EU.

She has received considerable attention as an analyst and commentator following the Russian invasion of Ukraine. She also writes as a columnist for the Finnish public broadcaster Yle, as well as having co-authored several books within her field.

Before her FIIA role, Saari worked at the Finnish Ministry for Foreign Affairs and the EU.

== Education and personal life ==
Saari holds a master's degree in political sciences (2002) from the University of Helsinki, and a PhD in International Relations (2007) from The London School of Economics and Political Science.

She is married with two children, and lives in Helsinki.

Her older sister is the filmmaker and writer Kirsikka Saari. They also have a younger brother, who is a linguist.

In her 20s, Saari lived in Russia for some time and has travelled there extensively since the late 1980s. In addition to her native Finnish, she speaks fluent Russian and English, and also some Swedish and French.
