= Global Security Review =

American geopolitical news website

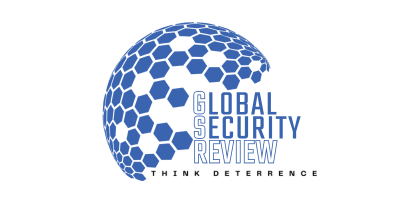
- Website type: World News
- Available in: English
- Editors: Adam Lowther, PhD
- Website: GlobalSecurityReview.com
- ISSN: 2573-4350

Global Security Review (also known to as GSR, or GlobalSecurityReview.com) is an American website that publishes coverage and analysis of international security and geopolitical affairs. The site was founded in 2017 by Joshua Ball.

== History ==
Since the website launched, its articles have been referenced by both mainstream and niche media outlets in the United States. Bloomberg, Small Wars Journal, and HuffPost have cited or quoted reports published by Global Security Review between October 2017 and July 2018. Additionally, A Shift in the International Security Environment: Potential Implications for Defense, a July 20, 2018 report published by the Congressional Research Service, cited a GSR report under "Articles on Countering Russia's Hybrid Warfare Tactics."

In the international media, analyses of the future geopolitical order published by Global Security Review were featured in articles published by the Dutch financial newspaper Het Financieele Dagblad and the Argentinian news outlet Urgente24.

In January 2018, a report detailing Chinese construction activity along the North Korean border was referenced in a video produced, released, and distributed by the Lee Kuan Yew School of Public Policy.

November 2024, the Global Security Review was relaunched with a focus on deterrence. The site features commentary and focuses on Arms Control & Nonproliferation, Strategic Adversaries, Allies & Extended Deterrence, Emerging Threats, Deterrence & Foreign Policy and Space Deterrence & Conflict. The website was relaunched with more recent content and a new editorial staff and new authors.
