= Kirsikka Saari =

Finnish film maker and screenwriter

- Born: 1973 (age 52–53); Helsinki, Finland
- Occupation: film maker
- Years active: 2008-present
- Relatives: Sinikukka Saari (sister)

Kirsikka Saari (born in 1973 in Helsinki) is a Finnish film maker and screenwriter.

Saari and fellow producer Selma Vilhunen are nominated for an Academy Award for Best Live Action Short Film for the 2013 film Do I Have to Take Care of Everything?.
