= Exchange officer =

Seconded armed forces officer

An exchange officer is a commissioned officer in a country's armed forces who is temporarily secondment either to a unit of the armed forces of another country or to another branch of the armed forces of their own country.

The exchange officer will usually perform all duties as if he or she were actually in the armed forces to which they are attached. This includes going to war, if required, although for international exchange officers this generally requires that permission be granted from their home government, and that other conditions may be attached. The stated purpose of an exchange officer program is usually to help foster understanding of each other's operating methods. This provides valuable feedback so that any issues that arise during joint operations, such as those under NATO, would not impede the achievement of mission objectives. Exchange officers usually serve in similar roles to those that their career path would take if they were to remain in the armed forces of their home state.

The British and the U.S. armed services have many exchange officers; for example, a British officer has been attached to the United States Military Academy at West Point for many years. The Australian Army also attaches one of its officers with the rank of captain to the Royal Military College of Malaysia. Though the Canadian government was stated to be neutral with regard to the Iraq War, many Canadians fought in Iraq under exchange with the U.S. military.

== Exchange officer programmes ==
As part of NATO interoperability of the UK/NL landing force the Netherlands Marine Corps (Korps Mariniers) regularly carry out an exchange program with their British Royal Marines counterparts, this acts to increase integration within this joint force whilst also continuing the close relationship between the two Corps.

== In fiction ==
- One of Peter Sellers' three roles in Dr. Strangelove is Lionel Mandrake, an RAF officer stationed at a US Air Force base.
- The Punisher, of Marvel Comics. A former U.S. Marine, Frank Castle was briefly attached to the Australian Special Air Service Regiment during the Vietnam War.
- The character of Lieutenant Commander Mic Brumby on JAG was a Royal Australian Navy officer assigned to work with the US Navy Judge Advocate General Corps as part of an officer exchange program.
- In the "A Matter of Honor" episode of Star Trek: The Next Generation, Commander Riker becomes an officer aboard a Klingon Bird-of-Prey as part of an exchange program between the United Federation of Planets and Klingon Empire. In "Sins of the Father", Worf's brother Kurn becomes first officer aboard the Enterprise.

== See also ==
- Military alliance
- Military Erasmus
