= Ulkopolitiikka =

Finnish political magazine

- Editor in chief: Hiski Haukkala
- Categories: Political magazine International relations
- Frequency: Quarterly
- Publisher: The Finnish Institute of International Affairs
- Founded: 1961; 65 years ago
- Final issue: March 2025
- Country: Finland
- Based in: Helsinki
- Language: Finnish
- Website: ulkopolitiikka.fi
- ISSN: 0501-0659
- OCLC: 4850469

Ulkopolitiikka (Finnish: The Finnish Journal of Foreign Affairs) was a Finnish-language magazine of international relations studies published by The Finnish Institute of International Affairs. The quarterly was in circulation from 1961 to 2025. It provided a significant forum on global politics and economics in Finland and is one of the leading magazines in the country.

== History ==
Ulkopolitiikka was launched by the Paasikivi Society in 1961. The magazine's headquarters is in Helsinki, and it was published by the Finnish Institute of International Affairs, a private institute attached to the Foundation for Foreign Policy Research. The magazine provided news on politics, economics and international affairs. The editor-in-chief was Matti Kalliokoski from 1994 to 1995. Mika Aaltola was editor-in-chief of the magazine. One of its contributors was Swedish diplomat Anders Thunborg.

Ulkopolitiikka was awarded in 2012 the quality award of the Association for Cultural, Scientific and Advocacy Magazines.

The Finnish Institute of International Affairs decided to dissolve the magazine in March 2025. The last editor-in-chief was Hiski Haukkala.

== See also ==
- List of magazines in Finland
