= Finnish Institute of International Affairs =

Research institute and think tank based in Helsinki, Finland

- Ulkopoliittinen instituutti
- Abbreviation: FIIA
- Formation: 1961; 65 years ago. Refounded in 2006; 20 years ago
- Type: International relations think tank
- Headquarters: Arkadiankatu 23 B, Helsinki, Finland
- Coordinates: 60.171671°N 24.924895°E
- Products: Ulkopolitiikka
- Director: Hiski Haukkala
- Affiliations: TEPSA; EPIN; Euromesco; TAPIR
- Budget: 5.072 m€ (2025)
- Website: www.fiia.fi/en/

The Finnish Institute of International Affairs (FIIA, Finnish: Ulkopoliittinen instituutti, Swedish: Utrikespolitiska institutet, UPI) is a state funded research institute that produces topical information and research on international relations and the European Union. It also publishes the journal Ulkopolitiikka. It is located in Helsinki.

== Organisation ==
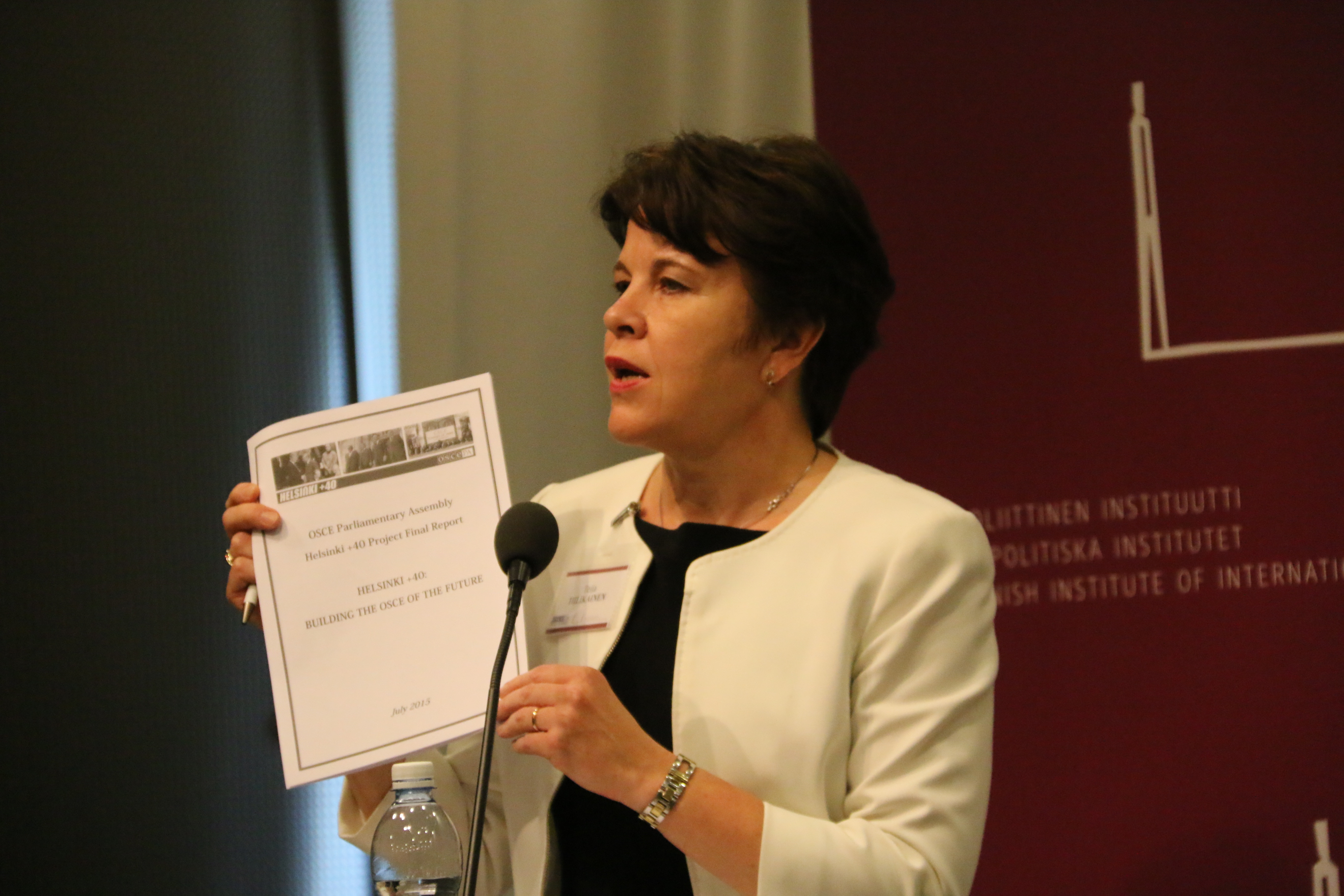
Teija Tiilikainen, the previous director of the institute, presenting a report on the OSCE Parliamentary Assembly in Helsinki in 2015

As of 2017, the institute has three different research programmes, which focus on the European Union, the EU's eastern neighbours and Russia, and global security. It also organises conferences, seminars, and round-table meetings on topical subjects related to the research programmes. These seminars provide a forum for high level discussions between academics and decision-makers. Research findings and current analyses of international topics are made public in publications called "FIIA-Report and Briefing Paper". In addition, the institute publishes Ulkopolitiikka, a quarterly journal on international relations. The institute also maintains the Archive and Chronology of Finnish Foreign Policy (Eilen Archive).

The staff of the institute consists of about 50 members. From 2019 to 2024, Mika Aaltola was Director of the FIIA, and the Research Director is Sinikukka Saari. The work of the institute is directed by a nine-member board appointed by the Parliament. The institute also has an advisory council. The institute was established during the centennial session of the Finnish Parliament in June 2006 and started to function on 1 January 2007 under the auspices of the Parliament of Finland. Previously, the institute functioned as a private research organization that was founded by the Paasikivi Society in 1961 and maintained by the Foundation for Foreign Policy Research.
Most of the institute's funding comes from the Parliament of Finland.

== Ongoing controversy over hiring president's son ==
On 6 June Finnish public broadcaster YLE reported that the president's Alexander Stubb son and first year student Oliver Stubb got picked for internship in FIIA. Reported reasons why he was chosen because he has distinguished himself with his "extremely high motivation and superior knowledge of subject matter".

Nine days later on 15 June, Iltalehti reported that the job announcement said explicitly that to get the job, applicant has to get full internship subsidy, which is 1800€. As a student of UK's University of Exeter, Oliver Stubb could get only 1275€ subsidy, which should have disqualified him from the consideration. It was also noted that during Oliver's inquiries about subsidies, FIIA's project leader and HR manager Marie-Louise Hindsberg answered him in a suspiciously familiar manner and even used the winking face emoji. She told him to apply anyway, but later it was revealed that she told an other candidate that application won't be considered without full internship subsidy.

Other top candidates have claimed that FIIA has called them by phone and explained their pick by winner's superior working experience in research. However, Oliver's job experience was among shortest of all candidates, he only cited his conscription service and his volunteer work in student organization, while other candidates have advanced much further in their studies and had experience in research. According to YLE's requested report from FIIA, in last few years, only one more student studying for bachelor's degree has been picked, but he/she was much further in his/her studies than Oliver.

=== FIIA statements on the matter ===
On 19 June FIIA's director Hiski Haukala released an official statement on Oliver Stubb's case, in which he reaffirmed that FIIA was following the best practices and the team of experts have unanimously picked Oliver as the best candidate for the internship. The reasoning behind the pick was Oliver's outstanding academic performance in respected foreign university, he succeeded in oral and written tasks better than any other candidate and could hold a conversation on subject matter on high level, and in interview he showed extremely high motivation as he was the only candidate who familiarized himself on FIIA's function and projects to such extend. To YLE, he expanded the statement that it would be unfair and discriminatory to not pick Oliver because of his family ties.

Initially Haukala has claimed that policy on internship subsidies have been changed before Oliver's application, but since he has admitted that the choice have been made two days after the application. But he still maintains the position that Oliver's application didn't have any effect on the policy change.

Project leader Harri Mikkola denied that the other top candidates were told that winner had better experience. However, he admitted that Hindsberg doesn't recall what exactly she said over the phone and mistakes might have happened.

On 16 July, Haukkala addressed latest concerns in YLE interview. On the matter of picking first year student with no experience in the field Haukkala stated that there's no policy on how many years of studies should be done before intern ship, and since there's no policy, you can't call it out or use it as a criterium in selection. On allegations that candidates received different messages regarding subsidy policies, he finds it regretful that there was some "sway" in communications. He admitted that some mistakes were made, but he sees it as an opportunity for FIIA to check its own practices.

== Directors ==
- Osmo Apunen (1965–1972)
- Jaakko Kalela (1972–1973)
- Kari Möttölä (1973–1988)
- Paavo Lipponen (1989–1991)
- Tuomas Forsberg (1998–2001 acting)
- Tapani Vaahtoranta (1991–2007)
- Raimo Väyrynen (2007–2009)
- Teija Tiilikainen (2010–2019)
- Mika Aaltola (2019–2024)
- Mikael Mattlin (2024) (acting)
- Hiski Haukkala (2024–present)

== See also ==
- Crisis Management Initiative
- European Centre of Excellence for Countering Hybrid Threats
