= Military Erasmus =

European Union initiative

The Military Erasmus Programme, formally the European initiative for the exchange of young officers inspired by Erasmus, is an initiative undertaken by the European Union (EU) member states aimed at developing the exchanges between armed forces of future military officers as well as their teachers and instructors during their initial education and training. Because the initiative is implemented by the Member States on a purely voluntary basis, their autonomy with regard to military training is not compromised.

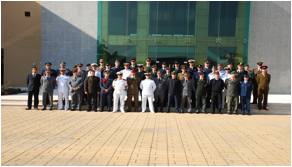
Common module on ESDP/CSDP

== History ==
=== Origins ===
The number of European crisis management operations and multinational military operations launched by European Union Member States in the framework of the Common Security and Defence Policy (CSDP) have increased, demonstrating a fast-growing need for a stronger interoperability of military forces, not only with regard to the pure technical and procedural aspects but also to the ability for the European military officers to work closely and effectively together.

One way to foster this ability is to integrate the education and training of the servicemen and their officers. The European military officers' educational institutes, and the Member States at a more diplomatic level, have had a long experience and tradition of exchanges, to this end.

The experience of mobility they acquired nevertheless revealed that, due to the particular nature of the education and training they provide, the military institutes could not make full use of all the possibilities offered by the mobility instruments available which were primarily designed for civilian higher education, such as the Erasmus programme. A need was identified, therefore, for addressing together these structural obstacles at the European level.

In the second half of 2008, the French EU Presidency then in office launched a programme of reflection on ways to allow greater integration of the initial academic and professional training of young European officers through mobility. The initiative for the exchange of young officers, inspired by Erasmus, was launched in November 2008 with the declaration by the European Ministers of Defence, meeting within the Council of the European Union, on the European Security and Defence Policy (2903rd External Relations Council meeting, Brussels 10 and 11 November 2008).

=== Implementation ===
The implementation of the initiative is driven by the key idea that exchanges of young officers during their initial training form the cornerstones for the emergence, in the longer run, of the increased interoperability and common culture that are needed for European security and defence. An Implementation Group was created in February 2009 as a task-oriented configuration of the European Security and Defence College's Executive Academic Board.

Relying on contributions and support from the Member States, their institutes and the European Security and Defence College's Secretariat, the Implementation Group very quickly made substantial progress on various aspects of the initiative.

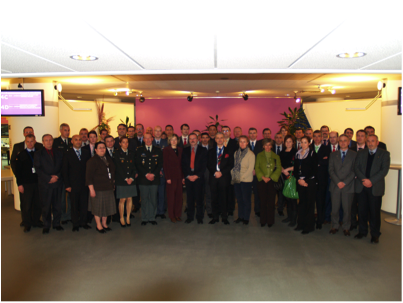
Implementation Group meeting

== Purpose ==
Young officers in training are the future military elites who will work for the realisation and consolidation of the Common Security and Defence Policy, regardless of their nationality or their armed forces. European military students and cadets share parts of their education and training as early as the basic level and are taught to be familiar with their future role and responsibilities in international security.

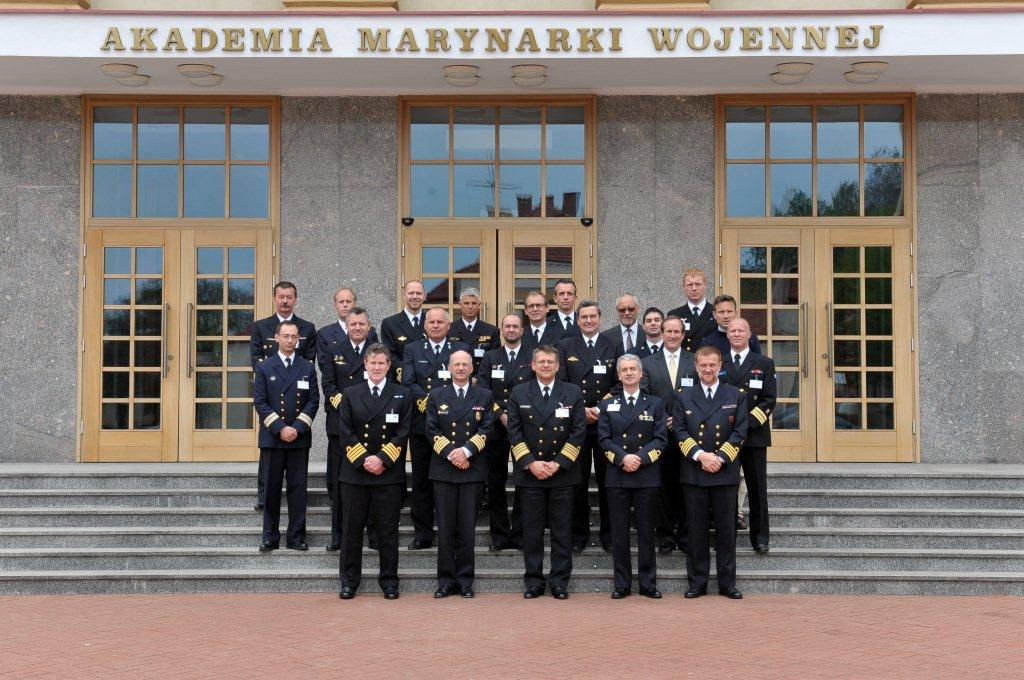
Pre-Meeting to the Conference of the Superintendents of the Naval Academies

The European initiative for the exchange of young officers, inspired by Erasmus, is meant to lower the barriers which may oppose to free mobility of knowledge, skills and competences of future military officers, their teachers and instructors between the European academies, schools, colleges, universities and training centres. To this end, the initiative supplements the action of the fora that have been created by European military institutes of a same service, such as the Conference of Superintendents of Naval Academies (Navy), the European Air Force Academies (EUAFA – Air Force) and the European Military Academies Commandants' Seminar (EMACS – Land Forces).

The Conclusions of the Council of the European Union, which founded the European initiative for the exchange of young officers, inspired by Erasmus, have translated these objectives into concrete measures, such as:

- Measures aimed at increasing the number of exchanges, such as the generalisation of the Bologna process, mutual recognition of the outcomes of exchanges in professional training, greater use of Erasmus mobility for students and personnel, opening of national educational opportunities to young European officers;
- Measures aimed at teaching/learning about Europe and its defence, such as the creation of a common module on the Common Security and Defence Policy, promotion of the learning of several foreign languages.

== Activities ==
On the basis of the standard curriculum developed by the European Security and Defence College, the Implementation Group created a common module on CSDP specifically addressed to these young audiences and aimed at preparing them for the European and international dimensions of their missions and careers. It was run for the first time in the Portuguese academies in 2009, then by the Spanish, Austrian and Greek initial education and training institutes. After only a year of existence, this module enabled more than 400 young officers to become familiar with the role they may be called to play in European defence in the future.

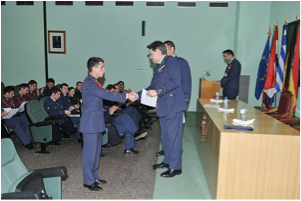
Graduation ceremony after a common module

A detailed stocktaking of the European officers' initial training has been completed, which assists the institutes concerned in identifying partners with whom they organise exchanges.

A forum and a newsletter, edited by the European Security and Defence College Secretariat, have also been set up for the institutes to communicate regarding supply and demand of exchanges. Communication is also achieved using other channels designed to disseminate information on the initiative, to the military students and the public for example, or to interact with the educational fora for addressing mobility challenges that are specific to one or several armed forces, such as Army, Navy, Air Force or Gendarmerie.

Due to the military nature of these educational exchanges, a framework arrangement has been developed and agreed by the EU Member States. It sets the conditions under which exchanges between Member States – wishing to participate – take place. It also lays down the recognition procedures for the outcomes of exchanges in military professional training. It therefore complements the learning agreements the institutions and the trainees usually set for their exchanges and which do not specifically deal with the military specificity of this form of higher education.

The officers' work is integrated into their educational process. Therefore, for exchanges of non-academic training modules, the participating institutes agreed within the initiative on best practices aimed at recognising the value of training undertaken abroad as equivalent in principle to national training.

The Member States and their institutes in the European initiative for the exchange of young officers also seek to provide a common European vision of the qualifications an officer should have after successfully completing his or her educational and training process.

Most of the military officers' education and training institutes are fully integrated into the European Higher Education Area. Thus, they also investigate the possibility to exchange through the mobility programmes that are shared with their civilian counterparts, such as the Erasmus programme, and many of them have set up exchange programmes with both civilian universities and other military education establishments using these mobility programmes.

Meanwhile, common curricula on issues shared by the European armed forces are being developed on a continuing basis, and national institutes regularly open or adapt existing learning modules to European participation.

== See also ==
- Common Security and Defence Policy
  - European Security and Defence College
- Erasmus Programme
- Exchange officer
