= Hybrid warfare =

Theory of military strategy

Hybrid warfare was defined by Frank Hoffman in 2007 as the emerging simultaneous use of multiple types of warfare by flexible and sophisticated adversaries who understand that successful conflict requires a variety of forms designed to fit the goals at the time. While there is no clear, accepted definition, methods include political warfare and blend conventional warfare, irregular warfare, and cyberwarfare with other influencing methods, such as fake news, diplomacy, lawfare, regime change, and foreign electoral intervention. By combining kinetic operations with subversive efforts, the aggressor intends to avoid attribution or retribution. The concept of hybrid warfare has been criticized by a number of academics and practitioners, who say that it is vague and has disputed constitutive elements and historical distortions.

== Definition ==
Every age has its own kind of war, its own limiting conditions, and its own peculiar preconceptions.

— Carl von Clausewitz

There is no universally accepted definition of hybrid warfare, with a debate over its utility and whether it simply refers to irregular methods to counter a conventionally superior force. The vagueness of the term means that it is often used as a catch-all term for all non-linear threats.

Hybrid warfare is warfare which includes some, parts, or all of the following aspects:

- A non-standard, complex, and fluid adversary. A hybrid adversary can be state or non-state. For example, in the Israel–Hezbollah War of 2006 and the Syrian Civil War, the main adversaries were non-state entities within the state system. The non-state actors can act as proxies for countries but have independent agendas as well. On the other hand, Russian involvement in Ukraine (pre-2022) can be described as a traditional state actor waging a hybrid war (in addition to using a local hybrid proxy) although Russia denied involvement in the 2014 Ukraine conflict.
- Use of combination of conventional and irregular methods. Methods and tactics may include conventional capabilities, irregular tactics, irregular formations, diplomacy, politics, terrorist acts, indiscriminate violence, and criminal activity. A hybrid adversary may also use clandestine actions to avoid attribution or retribution. The methods are used simultaneously across the spectrum of conflict with a unified strategy. A current example is the Islamic State's transnational aspirations, blended tactics, structured formations, and cruel use of terrorism as part of its arsenal.
- Use of advanced weapons systems and other disruptive technologies. Such weapons can be now bought at bargain prices.
- Use of mass communication for propaganda. The growth of mass communication networks offers powerful propaganda and recruiting tools. The use of fake-news websites to spread false stories is a possible element of hybrid warfare.
- Three distinct battlefields. They are the conventional battlefield, the indigenous population of the conflict zone, and the international community.

=== Other definitions ===
The Chief of Staff of the US Army defined a hybrid threat as an adversary that incorporates "diverse and dynamic combinations of conventional, irregular, terrorist and criminal capabilities." The US Joint Forces Command defines a hybrid threat as "any adversary that simultaneously and adaptively employs a tailored mix of conventional, irregular, terrorism and criminal means or activities in the operational battle space. Rather than a single entity, a hybrid threat or challenger may be a combination of state and nonstate actors."

The US Army defined a hybrid threat in 2011 as "the diverse and dynamic combination of regular forces, irregular forces, criminal elements, or a combination of these forces and elements all unified to achieve mutually benefiting effects." NATO uses the term to describe "adversaries with the ability to simultaneously employ conventional and non-conventional means adaptively in pursuit of their objectives."

According to the 2017-inaugurated European Centre of Excellence for Countering Hybrid Threats, "hybrid threats are methods and activities that are targeted towards vulnerabilities of the opponent" where the "range of methods and activities is wide".

=== Relation to the grey-zone ===
The concept of grey-zone conflicts or warfare is distinct from the concept of hybrid warfare, although the two are intimately linked, as in the modern era states most often apply unconventional tools and hybrid techniques in the grey-zone. However many of the unconventional tools used by states in the grey-zone such as propaganda campaigns, economic pressure, and the use of non-state entities do not cross over the threshold into formalized state-level aggression.

== Effectiveness ==
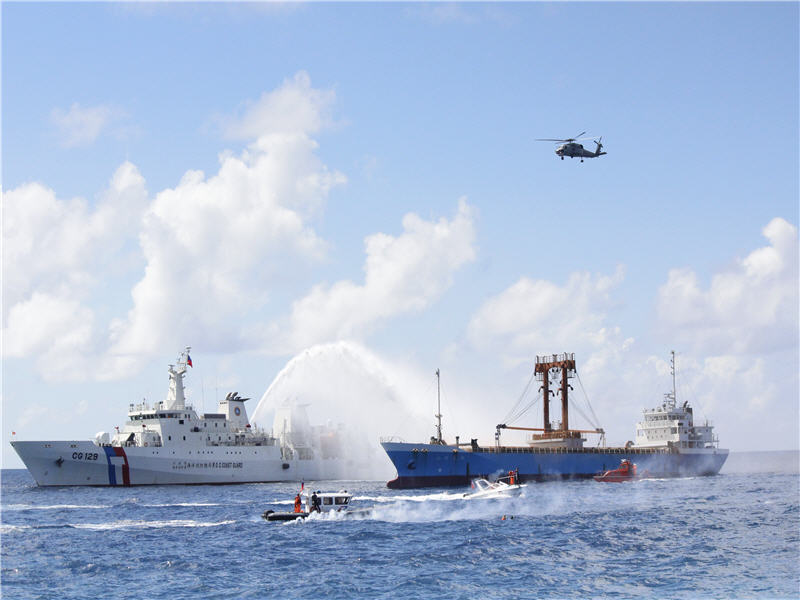
Taiwanese inter-agency counter-hybrid warfare exercise

Traditional militaries find it hard to respond to hybrid warfare since it is hard to agree on the source of the conflict. An article published in Global Security Review, "What is Hybrid Warfare?" compares the notion of hybrid warfare to the Russian concept of "non-linear" warfare, which it defines as the deployment of "conventional and irregular military forces in conjunction with psychological, economic, political, and cyber assaults." The article partially attributes the difficulty to the "rigid" or static military taxonomy used by NATO to define the very concept of warfare.

To counter a hybrid threat, hard power is often insufficient. Often, the conflict evolves under the radar, and even a "rapid" response turns out to be too late. Overwhelming force is an insufficient deterrent. Many traditional militaries lack the flexibility to shift tactics, priorities, and objectives constantly.

== History ==
When going through the work of philosophers who dealt with propaganda and governance in the last 3,000 years, one can find that "hybrid war" as a concept, is not new. The combination of conventional and irregular methods has been deployed and been documented throughout history. A few examples of that type of combat are found in the American Revolutionary War (a combination of George Washington's Continental Army with militia forces) and the Napoleonic Wars (British regulars co-operated with Spanish guerrillas).

There are examples of hybrid warfare in smaller conflicts during the 19th century. For instance, between 1837 and 1840, Rafael Carrera, a Conservative peasant rebel leader in Guatemala, waged a successful military campaign against the Liberals and the federal government of Central America by using a strategy that combined classical guerrilla tactics with conventional operations. Carrera's hybrid approach to warfare gave him the edge over his numerically-superior and better-armed enemies. The Soviet Union engaged in an early case of hybrid warfare in 1944. When the Tuvan Army was away in Europe, fighting along the Red Army against the Third Reich, Moscow annexed the Tuvan People's Republic by successfully pressing the Tuvan government to ask for membership in the Soviet Union.

=== After 1945 ===
The Vietnam War saw hybrid warfare tactics employed by both sides, with the US using the CIA to support civil war parties in Laos and the Cambodian Civil War as well as ethnic groups inside Vietnam for its cause, and the Soviet Union supporting the Viet Cong militia.

=== After 1989 ===
The end of the Cold War created a unipolar system with a preponderant American military power. Though that tempered traditional conflicts, regional conflicts and threats that leverage the weaknesses of conventional military structures became more frequent.

At the same time, the sophistication and the lethality of non-state actors increased. They are well armed with technologically advanced weapons, now available at low prices. Commercial technologies such as drones, cellphones and digital networks were also adapted to the battlefield. Another new element is the ability of non-state actors to persist within the modern system.

== Modern examples ==
=== 2006 Israel–Hezbollah War ===
One of the most often quoted examples of a hybrid war is the 2006 conflict between Israel and Hezbollah. Hezbollah is a sophisticated non-state actor that is sponsored by Iran. The war featured about 3,000 Hezbollah fighters embedded in the local population against about 30,000 Israeli regular troops.

The group used decentralized cells composed of guerrillas and regular troops, armed with weaponry supplied by nation-states, such as anti-tank missiles, rockets, armed unmanned aerial vehicles, and advanced improvised explosive devices. Iranian Quds Force operatives acted as mentors and suppliers of advanced systems.

Hezbollah leveraged mass communication immediately distributing battlefield photos and videos dominating the perception battle throughout the conflict.

=== 2014 ISIL advance into Iraq ===
The Islamic State of Iraq and the Levant (ISIL) is a non-state actor which used hybrid tactics against the conventional Iraqi military. ISIL has transitional aspirations and uses irregular and regular tactics and terrorism. In response, Iraq turned to hybrid tactics itself by using non-state and international actors to counter the ISIL advance. The United States was a hybrid participant and used a combination of traditional air power, advisers to Iraqi government troops, Kurdish peshmerga, sectarian militias; it also trained opposition forces within Syria. The hybrid war was a conflict with an interconnected group of state and non-state actors pursuing overlapping goals and a weak local state.

=== Russian activities since the 2010s ===
The Russian government's wide use in conflicts the Syrian Civil War and the Russo-Ukrainian War, of private military contractors such as those of the Wagner Group was in 2018 singled out by experts as a key part of Russia's strategy of hybrid warfare to advance its interests and obfuscating its involvement and role. Specifically, Russia employed a combination of traditional combat warfare, economic influence, cyber strategies, and disinformation attacks against Ukraine.

Regarding Russia, Jānis Bērziņš, the director of the Center for Security and Strategic Research, has widely published to argue that using the term "hybrid" to characterize the Russian strategy is misleading since Russia has its own definitions and concepts: "the word 'hybrid' is catchy since it can represent a mix of anything. However, its basic framework differs from the one developed by the Russians due to the former being a military concept and the result of American military thought. Moreover, the concept of New Generation Warfare includes conventional operations. In other words, Hybrid Warfare might be part of New Generation Warfare but cannot define it."

Michael Kofman, a senior research scientist at CNA and a fellow at the Wilson Center's Kennan Institute, noted in March 2018 that the West′s frequent references to hybrid warfare were in effect "an unintelligible Western reaction, after decades of wars of choice against paltry adversaries, to confrontation with another power that is capable across the full spectrum of conflict."

Russia's activities in the former Soviet states have been described as Hobbesian and redolent of Cold War thinking.

General Philip Breedlove, in a US Senate hearing in February 2016, said that Russia is using refugees to weaken Europe and is directing the influx of refugees to destabilize areas and regions in terms of economy and to create social unrest. On 10 February 2016, Finnish Defence Minister Jussi Niinistö told a meeting of NATO Defence Ministers that Finland expects Russia to open a second front, with as many as 1 million migrants possibly arriving over the Finnish-Russian border. A similar statement was made by Ilkka Kanerva, Finland's former foreign minister and now the chairman of the country's parliamentary Defense Committee.

=== Alleged American activities against Russia ===
Moscow has accused Washington of conducting hybrid warfare against Russia during the colour revolutions. Its perception of being at war or in a permanent state of conflict with the US and its allies was furthered by the 2014 Maidan uprising in Ukraine.

Speaking at the Valdai Discussion Club in November 2014, Russian Foreign Minister Sergey Lavrov said:

It is an interesting term, but I would apply it above all to the United States and its war strategy – it is truly a hybrid war aimed not so much at defeating the enemy militarily as at changing the regimes in the states that pursue a policy Washington does not like. It is using financial and economic pressure, information attacks, using others on the perimeter of a corresponding state as proxies and of course information and ideological pressure through externally financed non-governmental organisations. Is it not a hybrid process and not what we call war?

=== Iranian activities in the 2010s ===
Iran's foreign policy exhibits characteristics associated with hybrid warfare. According to the BBC, "Iran, along with its Houthi allies [in Yemen], is conducting a classic war of the weak against the strong; a "hybrid conflict" as it is known in the strategic textbooks. It is borrowing many of the tactics from the Russian play-book – the use of deniability; proxies; cyber-operations and information warfare."

=== Perceived US activities against Iran ===
The US was accused in 2019 by Ali Shamkhani, secretary of Iran's Supreme National Security Council, of conducting hybrid warfare against Iran and other countries.

=== Saudi and Emirati activities in the 2010s ===
Saudi Arabia and United Arab Emirates have been accused of conducting hybrid warfare against Qatar.

=== Chinese activities ===
China has been accused of conducting hybrid warfare against Taiwan and in the South China Sea. Bankov (2023) suggests that "China has its own signature and traditions in waging hybrid warfare, which deserve special attention." Subsequently, Pietrzak (2025) suggests that China is persistent in its use of "effective hybrid and sharp strategies, such as the use of sophisticated underwater submarine drones and killing flying objects deployed for reconnaissance and to secure areas soon to be officially claimed by China."

=== Belarusian activities in 2021 ===
Poland and the Baltic states have accused Belarus of conducting hybrid warfare against the European Union by organizing illegal border crossings with migrants into Latvia, Lithuania and Poland with the aim of destabilizing the 27-nation bloc. Gizicki (2025) suggests that "Russia is undertaking many aggressive actions related to its superpower and neo-imperialism policies. Of key importance for Russia is to take control of Eastern Europe and parts of Central Europe, the so-called near abroad that was once part of the Soviet Union or strongly influenced by it during the Cold War."

== See also ==
- Accelerated pluralism
- Active measures – Political warfare conducted by the USSR & Russia
- Asymmetric warfare – War between belligerents whose relative military power differs significantly
- Cabbage tactics – Chinese naval tactic
- Corporate warfare – Form of information warfare
- Critical infrastructure protection – National security institution
- Destabilisation – Attempts to undermine political, military or economic power
- Economic warfare – Strategy to weaken an opponent's economy
- European Centre of Excellence for Countering Hybrid Threats – International think tank based in Helsinki, Finland
- Fog of war – Uncertainty in situational awareness
- Internet manipulation – Manipulation of digital technology
- Nicaragua v. United States – 1986 International Court of Justice case
- Organized crime – Structured criminal groups
- Proactive cyber defence
- Psychological warfare – Information operations to assist military objectives
- Second Cold War – Term referring to heightened tensions in the 21st century
- Sri Lankan Civil War – 1983–2009 Sri Lankan internal conflict
- Unconventional warfare – Opposite of conventional warfare
- Unit 29155 – Unit of the Russian Main Intelligence Directorate
- Whole-of-society – Concept in international relations
