= European Centre of Excellence for Countering Hybrid Threats =

International think tank based in Helsinki, Finland

Coordinates: 60.183854°N 24.961891°E

- Abbreviation: Hybrid CoE
- Formation: 11 April 2017; 9 years ago
- Type: Hybrid threats think tank
- Headquarters: Helsinki, Finland
- Director: Teija Tiilikainen
- Budget: €4.23 million (2023)
- Staff: 40 (2023)
- Website: Official website

The European Centre of Excellence for Countering Hybrid Threats (Hybrid CoE; Finnish: Euroopan hybridiuhkien torjunnan osaamiskeskus) is a network-based international and independent hub for practitioners and experts based in Helsinki, Finland. The Hybrid CoE focuses on responses to hybrid threats under the auspices of the European Union (EU) and NATO.

== Function ==
Hybrid CoE is described as a 'do tank' that conducts training courses and exercises, hosts workshops for policymakers and practitioners, and produces white papers on hybrid threats, such as vulnerabilities in an electrical grid or possible exploitation of vaguely written legislation.

== History ==
The Centre was formally established in April 2017 under Finnish law, with a memorandum of understanding between eight European states and the United States and in alignment with EU and NATO decisions. As of March 2022, it had 22 member states. The Centre was inaugurated in October 2017 and allotted a budget of €1.5 million. It was first located in the Sörnäinen neighbourhood of Helsinki and was staffed by fifteen persons in 2018 with international expert networks to support them.

In January 2026, United States President Donald Trump announced that the United States would withdraw from the organization.

== See also ==
- Centre Against Terrorism and Hybrid Threats
- European Union Intelligence and Situation Centre
- Finnish Institute of International Affairs
- Finnish Security Intelligence Service
- List of cyber warfare forces
- Machtpolitik
- Maskirovka
