= NATO School =

School in Germany

NATO School Oberammergau
- Motto: Knowledge Enables Capability
- Established: March 1953
- Officer in charge: Col. Brad Ritzel, USA-A
- Dean: Col. K. Allan McDonald, US-AF
- Administrative staff: 150
- Students: 12,386 (2025)
- Location: Oberammergau, Garmisch-Partenkirchen, Germany; 47°36′N 11°5′E
- Campus: NSO Campus
- Website: www.natoschool.nato.int

The NATO School Oberammergau in southern Germany is NATO's key training facility on the operational level. The School started with two courses in 1953 and now offers over 100 different courses to Alliance members and partners on subjects related to NATO's policies, strategies, missions and operations.

The school conducts multinational military education and individual training in support of current and developing NATO operations, strategy, policy, doctrine and procedures. This includes cooperation, dialogue, and information exchange, as well as education and training, with military and civilian personnel from non-NATO nations. Annually, more than 10,000 students and conference attendees visit the school.

Since 1953, more than 200,000 officers, non-commissioned officers and civilians have attended courses at the School. Annually, about 12,000 students and conference attendees visit the School.

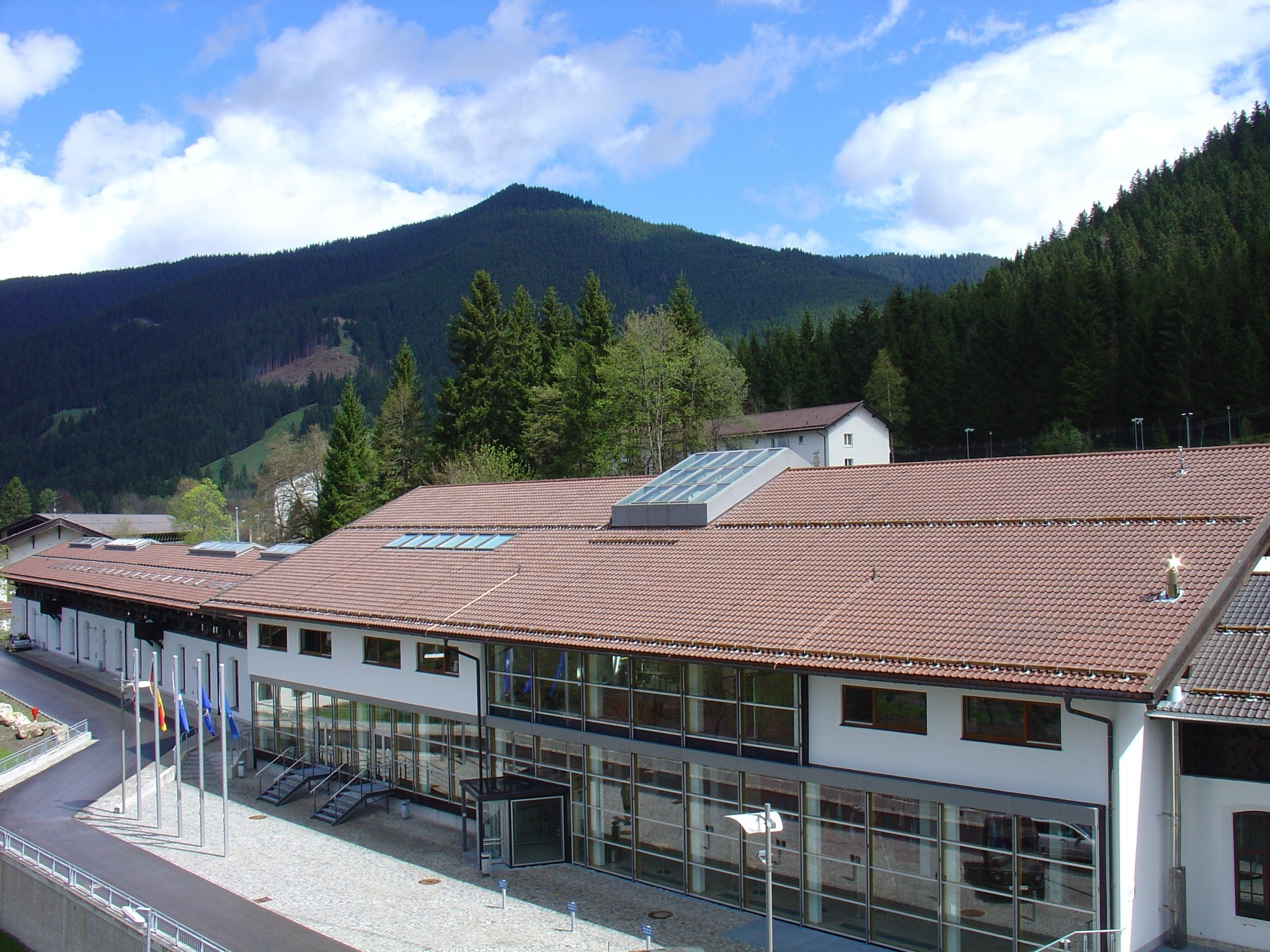
NSO's main building

== Curriculum ==
The NATO School Oberammergau provides courses of instruction in nine Academic Departments, mostly one week in duration, in the fields of:

- Cooperative Security (COSEC)
- Multi-Domain Capabilities (MDC)
- Intelligence (INTEL)
- Joint Plans and Operations (JPO)
- Joint Effects (JE)
- Non Commissioned Officer Programmes (NCOPD)
- Legal
- Standards, Evaluation and Training Department (SET)
- Joint Enabling Capabilities (JEC)

Primarily focused on individual education, NATO School Oberammergau also supports many aspects of collective training, exercises, experimentation and operations. Education and training is centred on combined and operational art while offering Mobile Education and Training Teams (METT), web based Advanced Distributed Learning (ADL) and of course resident courses and seminars. Moreover, the School has become a destination for many defence and security related conferences.

== History ==
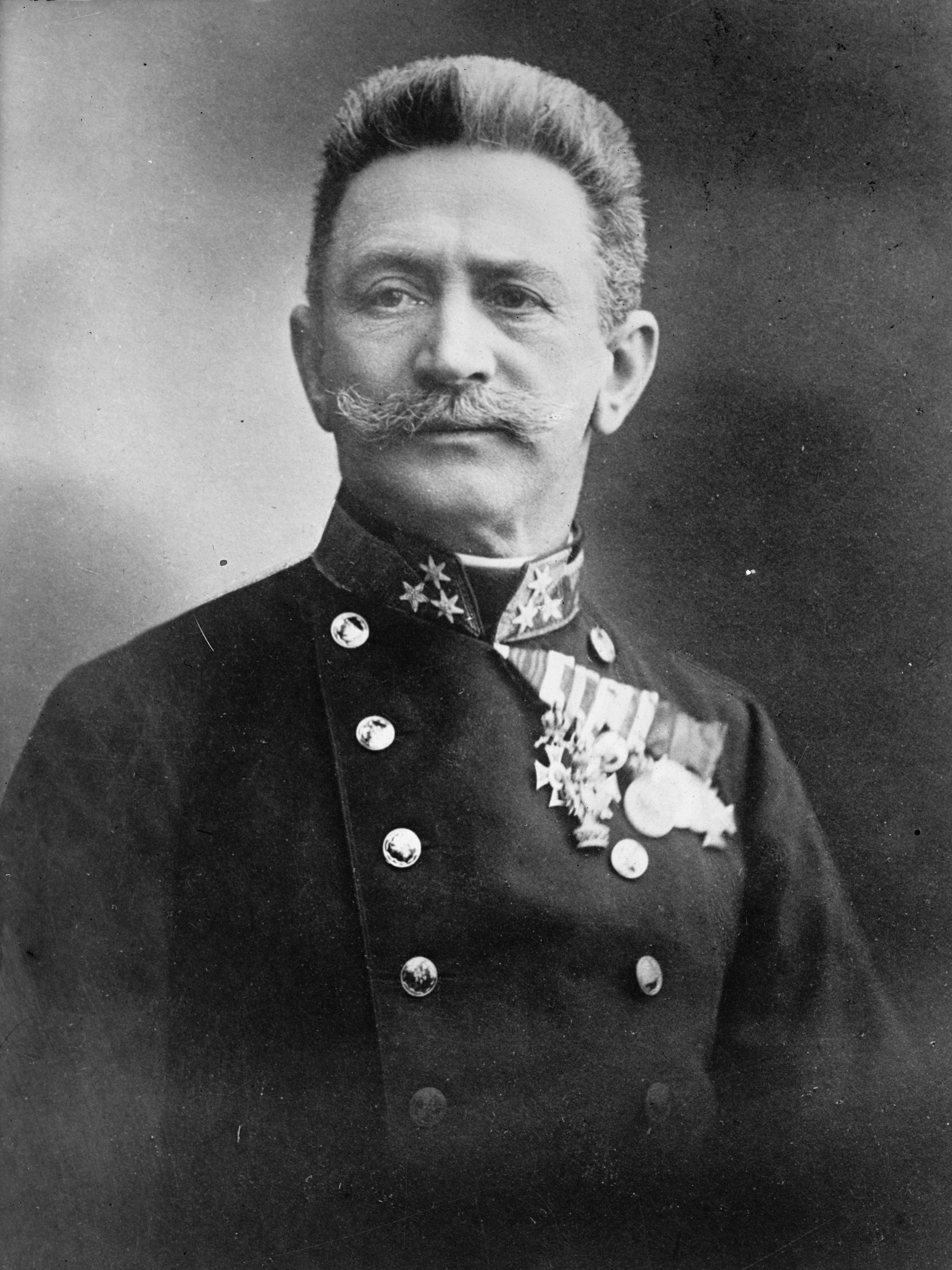
Franz Conrad von Hötzendorf, 1914

In October 1937, the 54th Mountain Signal Battalion moved into the Hötzendorf Barracks. From August 1943 the Messerschmitt research and design bureau operated on to the site, under the cover name of "Upper Bavarian Research Institute". In an underground factory the Institute produced the first serially usable military twin jet aircraft such as the Messerschmitt-262 and worked on variable-geometry "Project 1101", the Enzian surface-to-air missile and other aircraft weapons systems.

Between 1970 and 1990 the school expanded its curriculum from 6 to 23 courses as NATO recognised the value of standardised education for members of the Alliance. The Orientation Department provided training for staff and flag rank officers newly assigned to NATO HQs.

A Nuclear, Biological and Chemical Department (NBC) gave instruction on the defence against NBC weapons and an Electronic Warfare Department trained students on defensive electronic warfare.

In 1984 the school was the target of an attempted terrorist attack by the Red Army Faction. A stolen car laden with explosives was driven on to the site and abandoned by its driver; alerted by suspicious guards the Bundespolizei successfully defused the bomb and there were no casualties.

While over the last decades the curriculum focused on courses reflecting the military circumstances of the Cold War, in the mid-90s new conflicts in the Balkans led to new courses enabling NATO forces securing the peace across the region.

The situation across the Balkans illustrated and raised awareness, for the numerous parties on the battlefield such as militias, civilians, United Nations agencies as many governmental and non-governmental organisations.

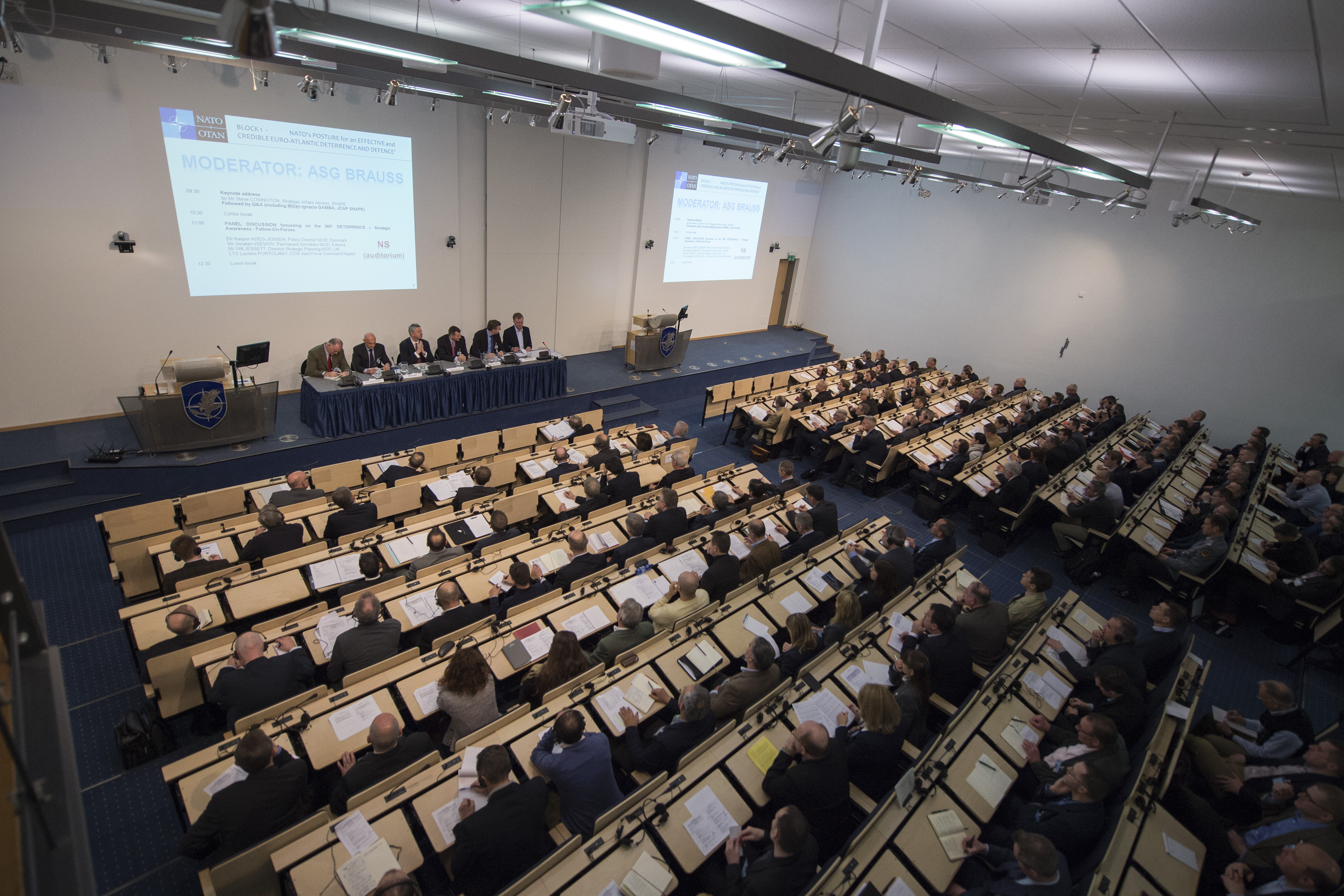
A conference held at Manfred Wörner Hall

During a Transfer of Authority Ceremony in June 2003, Supreme Allied Commander Transformation (SACT) took over the responsibilities of the school and the school got its present name: "NATO School Oberammergau". In 2013 the NSO celebrated the 60th anniversary of NATO training at Oberammergau.

== Stakeholders ==
Location of the NATO School in Oberammergau

Allied Command Transformation (ACT) provides guidance for the School's quality assurance with Allied Command Operations (ACO – also known as SHAPE) providing most of the curriculum. The courses are continually revised and updated to reflect current developments in SHAPE and across NATO as a whole.

Germany and United States contribute personnel, facilities and logistics support. The expanded role of the School is reflected in its staff and faculty. More than twenty nations voluntarily contribute personnel to the staff body of the School.

The students regularly come from all allied and national military commands within the NATO alliance. Students from about 80 different nations attend classes in Oberammergau, including members of the alliance's Partnership for Peace programme, nations composing the Mediterranean Dialogue and the Istanbul Conference Initiative, and other Partner nations.

== See also ==
- NATO Defense College
